= Meetjesland =

Coordinates: 51°10′N 3°30′E

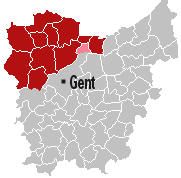
Location of Meetjesland in East Flanders.

The Meetjesland (Dutch pronunciation: [ˈmeːtɕəsˌlɑnt]) is a historical region in the north-west of the province East Flanders in Belgium.

== Etymology ==
There are many legends surrounding the origin of the name. The most known is the one of Emperor Charles V (Charles V) who was known for his sexual appetite. The story goes that when he traveled through the region people hid their daughters and their attractive young women, making emperor Charles think this region was full of old women (meetjes).

== Geography ==
Due to its historical nature, "Meetjesland" is not a fixed region as such. Even so, it is widely accepted to comprise the following municipalities:

- Aalter
- Assenede
- Eeklo
- Evergem
- Kaprijke
- Knesselare
- Lovendegem
- Maldegem
- Nevele
- Sint-Laureins
- Waarschoot
- Wachtebeke
- Zelzate
- Zomergem

Eeklo is considered to be the capital of "Meetjesland".

== Events ==
The official holiday of "Meetjesland" is celebrated on 21 June.
