= Escaut (department) =

Former French department (1795–1814)

Department of Escaut Département de l'Escaut (French) Departement Schelde (Dutch)
- 1795–1814
- Location of Escaut in France (1812)
- Status: Department of the French First Republic and the French First Empire
- Chef-lieu: Ghent; 51°3′N 3°44′E
- Official languages: French
- Common languages: Dutch
- History
  - Creation: 1 October 1795
  - Treaty of Paris, disestablished: 30 May 1814

Area
- 1812: 3,570 km^{2} (1,380 sq mi)

Population
  - 1789: 583,059
  - 1799: 594,617
  - 1800: 602,072
  - 1812: 636,438
Preceded by	Succeeded by
County of Flanders; Generality Lands	East Flanders
- Today part of: Belgium; Netherlands

Escaut (French: [ɛsko], Dutch: Schelde) was a department of the French First Republic and French First Empire in present-day Belgium and Netherlands. It was named after the river Scheldt (Escô, Schelde), which is called the Escaut in French. It was created on 1 October 1795, when the Austrian Netherlands and the Prince-Bishopric of Liège were officially annexed by the French Republic. Before annexation by France, its territory was part of the County of Flanders and the Dutch Republic (Staats-Vlaanderen).

Escaut within the northern French Empire (1811)

The Chef-lieu of the department was Ghent (Gand in French). The department was subdivided into the following four arrondissements and cantons (as of 1812):

- Gand: Cruyshouthem, Deynse, Evergem, Gand (4 cantons), Loochristi, Nazareth, Nevèle, Oosterzeele, Sommergem and Waerschoot.
- Termonde: Alost (2 cantons), Beveren, Hamme, Lockeren, Saint-Gillis, Saint-Nicolas, Tamise, Termonde, Wetteren and Zèle.
- Eccloo: Assenède, Axel, Capryck, Eccloo, L'Écluse, Hulst, Oostbourg and Yzendick.
- Audenarde: Audenarde (2 cantons), Grammont, Herzèle, Maria-Hoorebecke, Niderbrakel, Ninove, Renaix and Sotteghem.

After Napoleon was defeated in 1814, the department became part of the United Kingdom of the Netherlands. Its territory corresponded with the present Belgian province of East Flanders and the Dutch region of Zeelandic Flanders.

== Administration ==
=== Prefects ===
The Prefect was the highest state representative in the department.

Term start	Term end	Office holder
2 March 1800	18 September 1808	Guillaume Charles Faipoult de Maisoncelles
18 September 1808	12 March 1813	Frédéric-Christophe d'Houdetot
12 March 1813	23 March 1813	Jean François Marie Delaître
23 March 1813	30 May 1814	Napoléon Jean-Évangéliste Desmousseaux de Givré

=== General Secretaries ===
The General Secretary was the deputy to the Prefect.

Term start	Term end	Office holder
23 May 1800	1 January 1801	Étienne Lehodey de Saultchevreuil
3 January 1801	5 July 1803	Claude Joachim Gréban de Saint-Germain
?? ?? 1805	30 May 1814	P. Tinel

=== Subprefects of Audenarde ===
Term start	Term end	Office holder
1 May 1800	15 January 1809	Constantin Beyens
15 January 1809	30 May 1814	Joseph Charles Emmanuel van Ertborn

=== Subprefects of Eccloo ===
This subprefecture was created in 1803, replacing Sas-de-Gand.

Term start	Term end	Office holder
24 September 1803	30 May 1814	André Étienne Bazenerye

=== Subprefects of Gand ===
Until 1811, the Prefect also held the office of Subprefect of Gand.

Term start	Term end	Office holder
14 January 1811	30 May 1814	Pierre Louis Joseph Servais van Gobbelschroy

=== Subprefects of Sas-de-Gand ===
This subprefecture was replaced by Eccloo in 1803.

Term start	Term end	Office holder
1 June 1800	15 September 1800	Aubert
15 September 1800	26 November 1802	Robert
26 November 1802	14 January 1803	François Pierre Eversdyck
14 January 1803	24 September 1803	André Étienne Bazenerye

=== Subprefects of Termonde ===
Term start	Term end	Office holder
1 May 1800	30 May 1814	Alexandre François Devos d’Ersele
