= Vinderhoute =

- Village
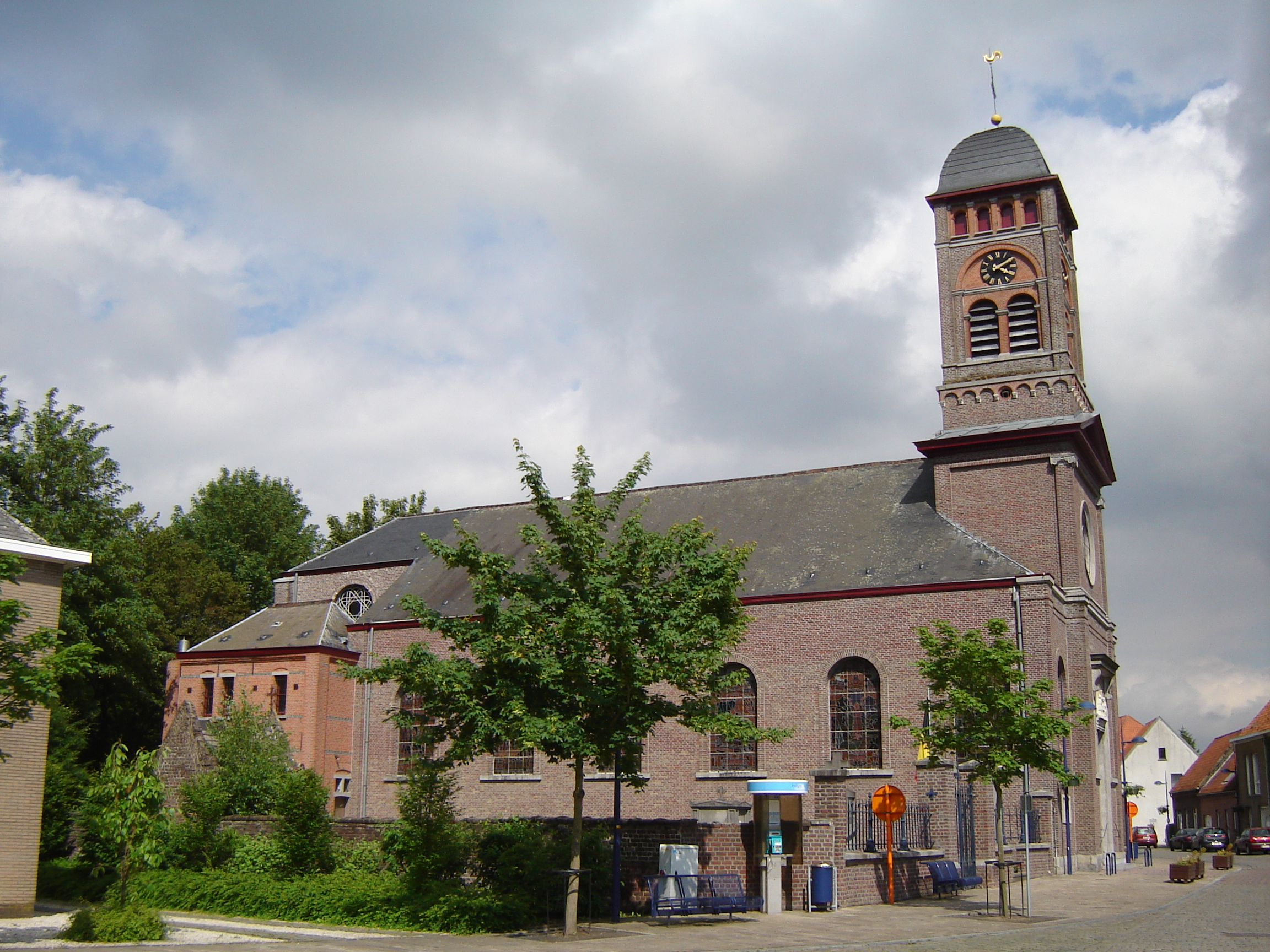
- St Bavo Church

- Location in Belgium
- Coordinates: 51.0872°N 3.6400°E
- Country: Belgium
- Region: Flemish Region
- Province: East Flanders
- Arrondissement: Ghent
- Municipality: Lievegem

Area
  - Total: 3.67 km^{2} (1.42 sq mi)

Population (2021)
  - Total: 1,191
  - Density: 325/km^{2} (841/sq mi)
- Time zone: CET

Vinderhoute is a village in the municipality of Lievegem in the province of East Flanders in Belgium. It is located in the Flemish Valley about 6 kilometres (3.7 mi) north-west of Ghent.

== History ==
Vinderhoute is located in the Flemish Valley on the left bank of the Ghent-Bruges Canal and is surrounded by waterways. A settlement has been discovered from the early La Tène culture near Vinderhoute. The village was first mentioned in 966 as containing a church and farm belonging to the Saint Bavo's Abbey. The heerlijkheid Vinderhoute was one of the oldest fiefs of the County of Flanders.

Vinderhoute was an independent municipality until 1977 when it was merged into Lovendegem. In 2019, it became a deelgemeente of Lievegem.

== Buildings and sights ==
Schouwbroek Castle was known to exist since 1755. In 1894, it was rebuilt in eclectic style, and a large park was laid out around the castle. Near the entrance are three chestnut trees. One of the trees is the thickest chestnut of Belgium. In 2014, the trees were measured by the Belgian Dendrological Society, and the tree has a trunk circumference of 919 centimetres (362 in), and is possibly the oldest chestnut as well.

Vinderhoute Castle was originally a fortified medieval castle. It was demolished and replaced by a manor house in the mid 16th century. It remained inhabited by the Lords of Vinderhoute. During the French Revolution, the heerlijkheid Vinderhoute was disestablished. In the mid-19th century, the estate was extensively renovated. The estate used to have a private road to the parish church.

The Saint Bavo Church was first mentioned in 966. The current church dates was constructed between 1855 and 1856, and is an aisleless neoclassic church with built-in tower. Unlike most churches it is oriented to the south.

The grist mill Van Vlaenderensmolen is a windmill from 1905 located on a slight elevation. The earliest windmill at the site was a wooden mill which was first attested in 1591. The windmill remained in service until 1958, and was later used as a residential house. It was extensively renovated between 2008 and 2009, but most of the inner workings had been removed.

== Gallery ==
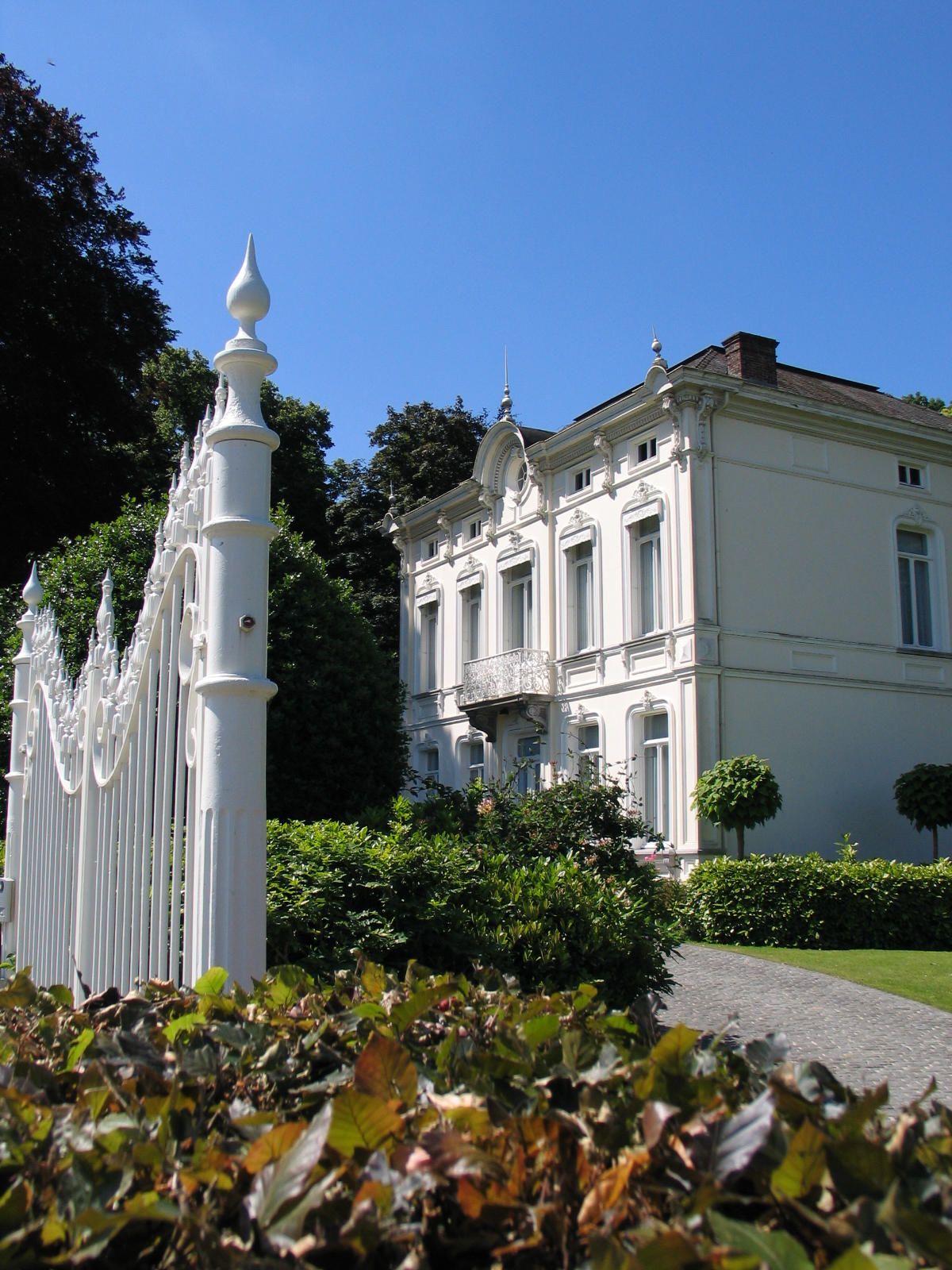
Villa in Vinderhoute

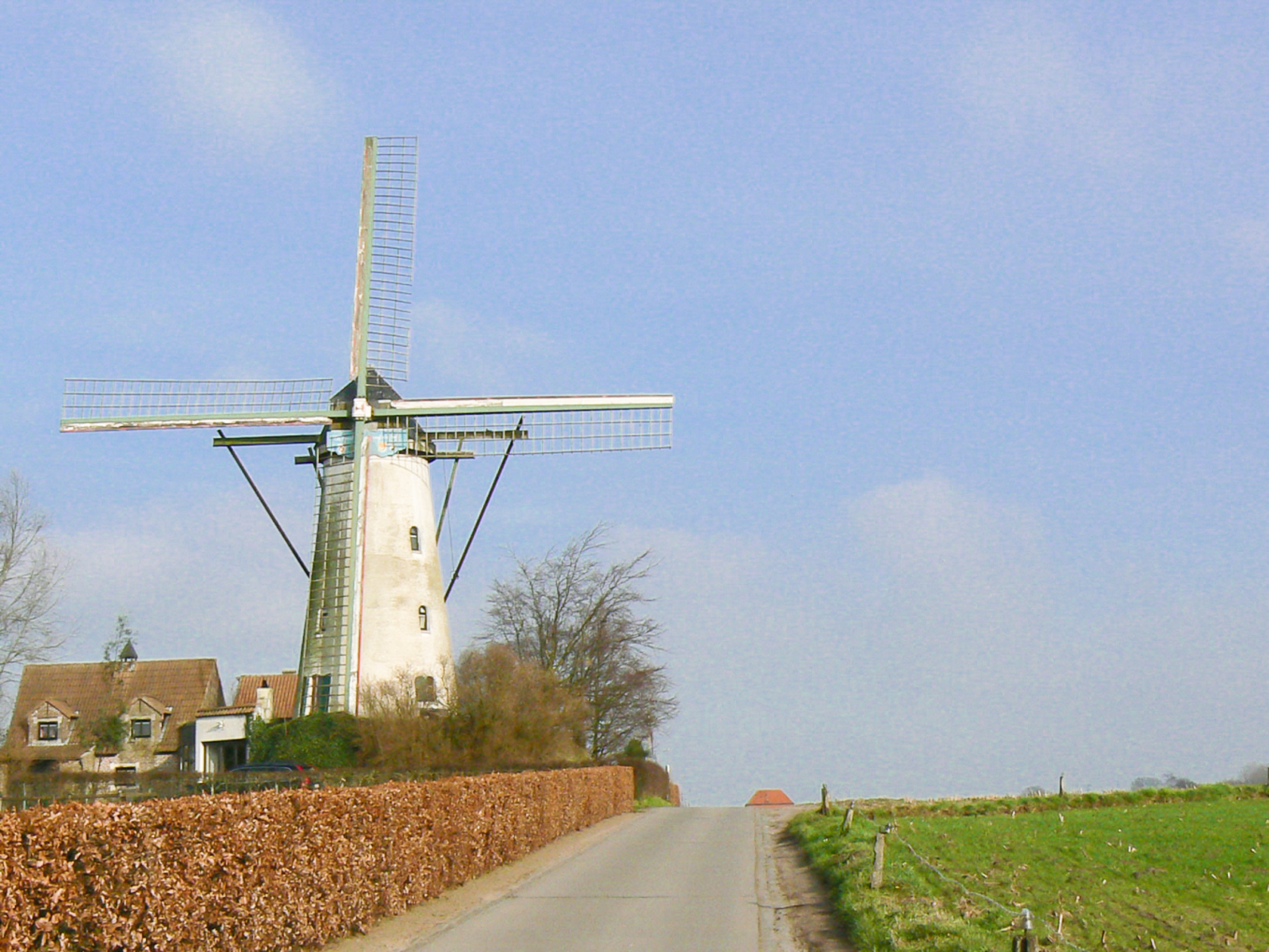
Windmill Van Vlaenderensmolen

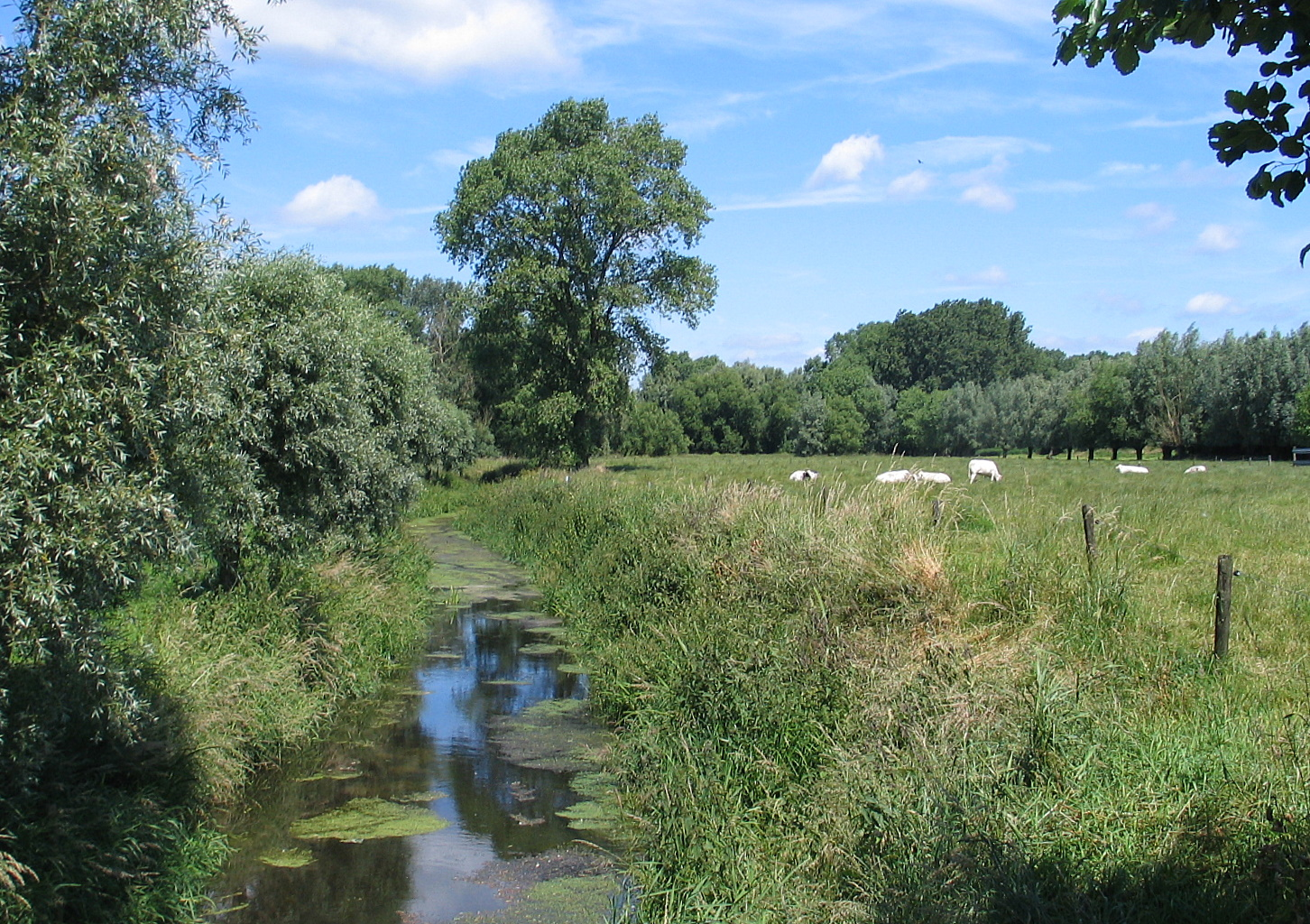
Country side near Vinderhoute

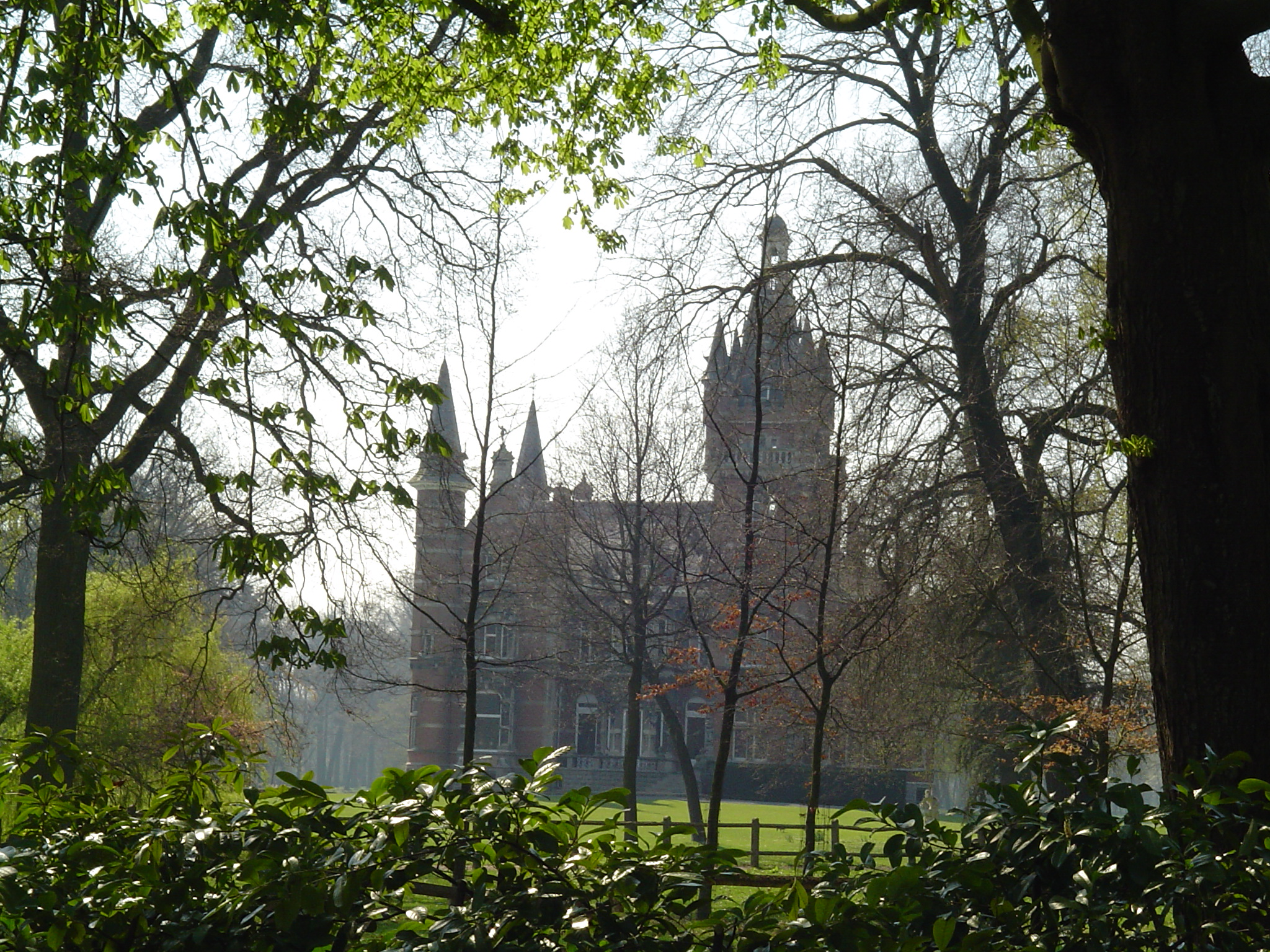
Schouwbroek Castle

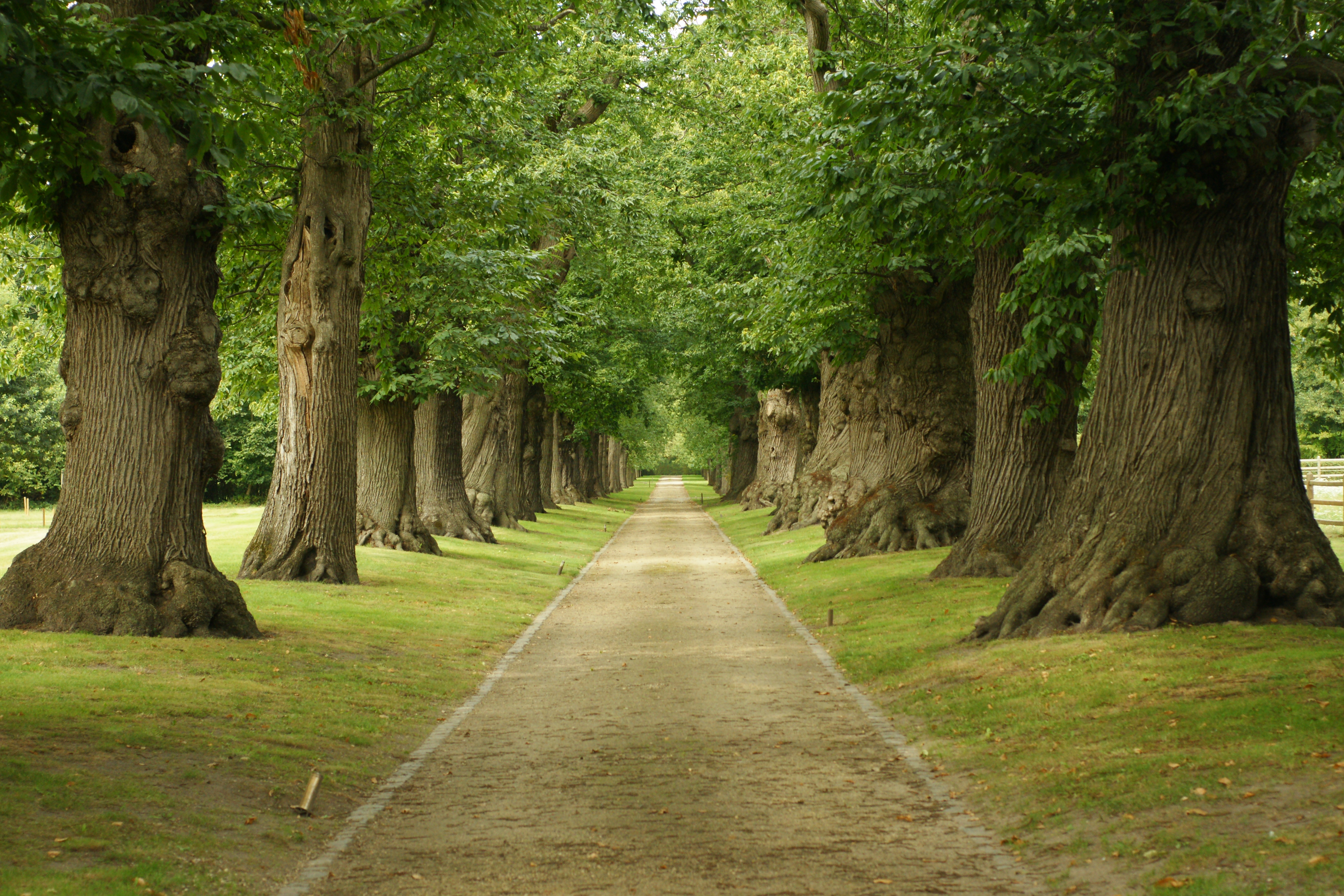
Chestnut Drove, Castle domain of Vinderhoute
