= Arrondissement of Ghent =

Arrondissement in East Flanders

Arrondissement of Ghent Arrondissement Gent
- Arrondissement
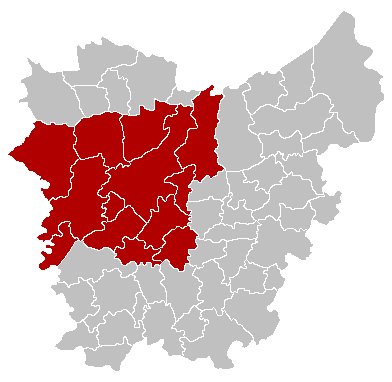
- Location of the arrondissement in East Flanders
- Coordinates: 51.05°N 3.7°E
- Country: Belgium
- Region: Flanders
- Province: East Flanders
- Municipalities: 13

Area
  - Total: 943.62 km^{2} (364.33 sq mi)

Population (1 January 2017)
  - Total: 553,961
  - Density: 587.06/km^{2} (1,520.5/sq mi)
- Time zone: UTC+1 (CET)
  - Summer (DST): UTC+2 (CEST)

The Arrondissement of Ghent (Dutch: Arrondissement Gent; French: Arrondissement de Gand) is the largest of the six administrative arrondissements in the Province of East Flanders, Belgium. It is both an administrative and a judicial arrondissement. However, the Judicial Arrondissement of Ghent also comprises the municipalities of the Arrondissement of Eeklo.

== History ==
The Arrondissement of Ghent was created in 1800 as the first arrondissement in the Department of Escaut (Dutch: Departement Schelde). It originally comprised the cantons of Deinze, Eeklo, Evergem, Ghent, Kruishoutem, Lochristi, Nazareth, Nevele, Oosterzele, Waarschoot and Zomergem. In 1803, the canton of Eeklo was merged with the Arrondissement of Sas-van-Gent to form the Arrondissement of Eeklo. The canton of Kruishoutem was ceded to the Arrondissement of Oudenaarde in 1818.

In 1921, parts of Laarne and Kalken (in the Arrondissement of Dendermonde) were added to the arrondissement to form the new municipality of Beervelde. Parts of Kluizen, Ertvelde en Zelzate were added to the arrondissement in 1927 from the Arrondissement of Eeklo. In 1977, the municipality of Ertvelde (of which Kluizen had been a part since 1965) in the Arrondissement of Eeklo ceased to exist and was merged into Evergem. As a result, it was added to the Arrondissement of Ghent.

Per 1 January 2019, the municipalities of Aalter and Knesselare were merged into Aalter, Deinze and Nevele into Deinze, and Waarschoot, Lovendegem and Zomergem into Lievegem. The number of municipalities in this arrondissement was thus be reduced from 21 to 17.

== Municipalities ==
The Administrative Arrondissement of Ghent consists of the following municipalities:

- Aalter
- Deinze
- Destelbergen
- Evergem
- Gavere
- Ghent
- Lievegem
- Lochristi
- Merelbeke-Melle
- Nazareth-De Pinte
- Oosterzele
- Sint-Martens-Latem
- Zulte
