= Ghent-Eeklo (Flemish Parliament constituency) =

Belgian political subdivision

Ghent-Eeklo was a constituency used to elect members of the Flemish Parliament between 1995 and 2003.

== Representatives ==
Election	MFP (Party)	MFP (Party)	MFP (Party)	MFP (Party)	MFP (Party)	MFP (Party)	MFP (Party)	MFP (Party)	MFP (Party)	MFP (Party)	MFP (Party)	MFP (Party)
1995	Wilfried Aers; VB	André Denys (VLD)	Roland Deswaene (VLD)	Patrick Lachaert (VLD)	Johan De Roo (CVP)	Bart Vandendriessche (CVP)	Erik Matthijs (CVP)	Mieke Van Hecke (CVP)	Paul Van Grembergen (VU)	Freddy De Vilder (PS)	Carlos Lisabeth (PS)	Vera Dua (Agalev)
1999	Wilfried Aers; VB	André Denys (VLD)	Paul Wille (VLD)	Patrick Lachaert (VLD)	Johan De Roo (CVP)	Monique De Gryze (VB)	Erik Matthijs (CVP)	Mieke Van Hecke (CVP)	Jan Roegiers (VU)	Dany Vandenbossche (PS)	Dirk Holemans (Agalev)	Vera Dua (Agalev)
