= Lievegem =

- Municipality
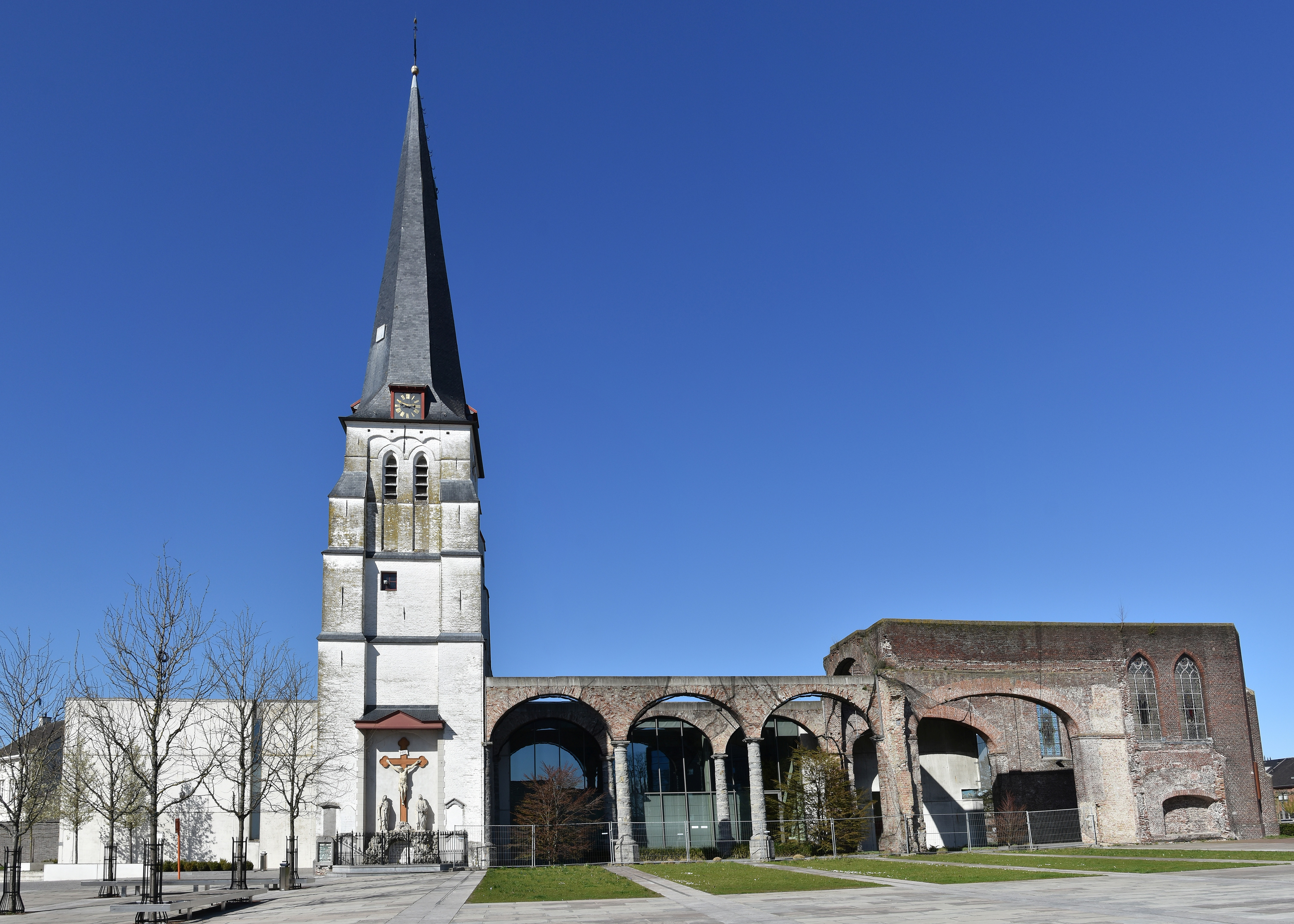

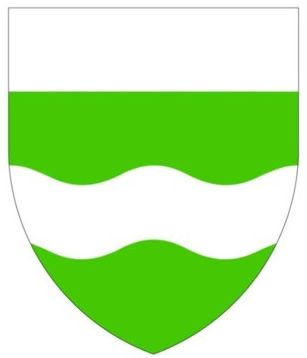
- Flag Coat of arms

- Location of the municipality of Lievegem
- Interactive map of Lievegem
- Location in Belgium
- Coordinates: 51.13°N 3.58°E
- Country: Belgium
- Community: Flemish Community
- Region: Flemish Region
- Province: East Flanders
- Arrondissement: Ghent

Government
  - Mayor: Kim Martens (CD&V)
  - Governing parties: CD&V, Open VLD

Area
  - Total: 80.78 km^{2} (31.19 sq mi)

Population (2022-01-01)
  - Total: 26,657
  - Density: 330.0/km^{2} (854.7/sq mi)
- Postal codes: 9920, 9921, 9930, 9931, 9932, 9950
- NIS code: 44085
- Area codes: 09
- Website: www.lievegem.be

Lievegem (Dutch pronunciation: [ˈlivəˌɣɛm]) is a municipality in the Belgian province of East Flanders that arose on 1 January 2019 from the merger of the municipalities of Waarschoot, Lovendegem and Zomergem.

The merged municipality has an area of 80.78 km^{2} and is home to 26,441 inhabitants as of 2021. A referendum was held for the new name of the municipality, and 55% voted for Lievegem (literally Lieve Canal settlement).

Lievegem consists of the following deelgemeentes (sub-municipalities): Lovendegem, Oostwinkel, Ronsele, Vinderhoute, Waarschoot, and Zomergem.

== Gallery ==
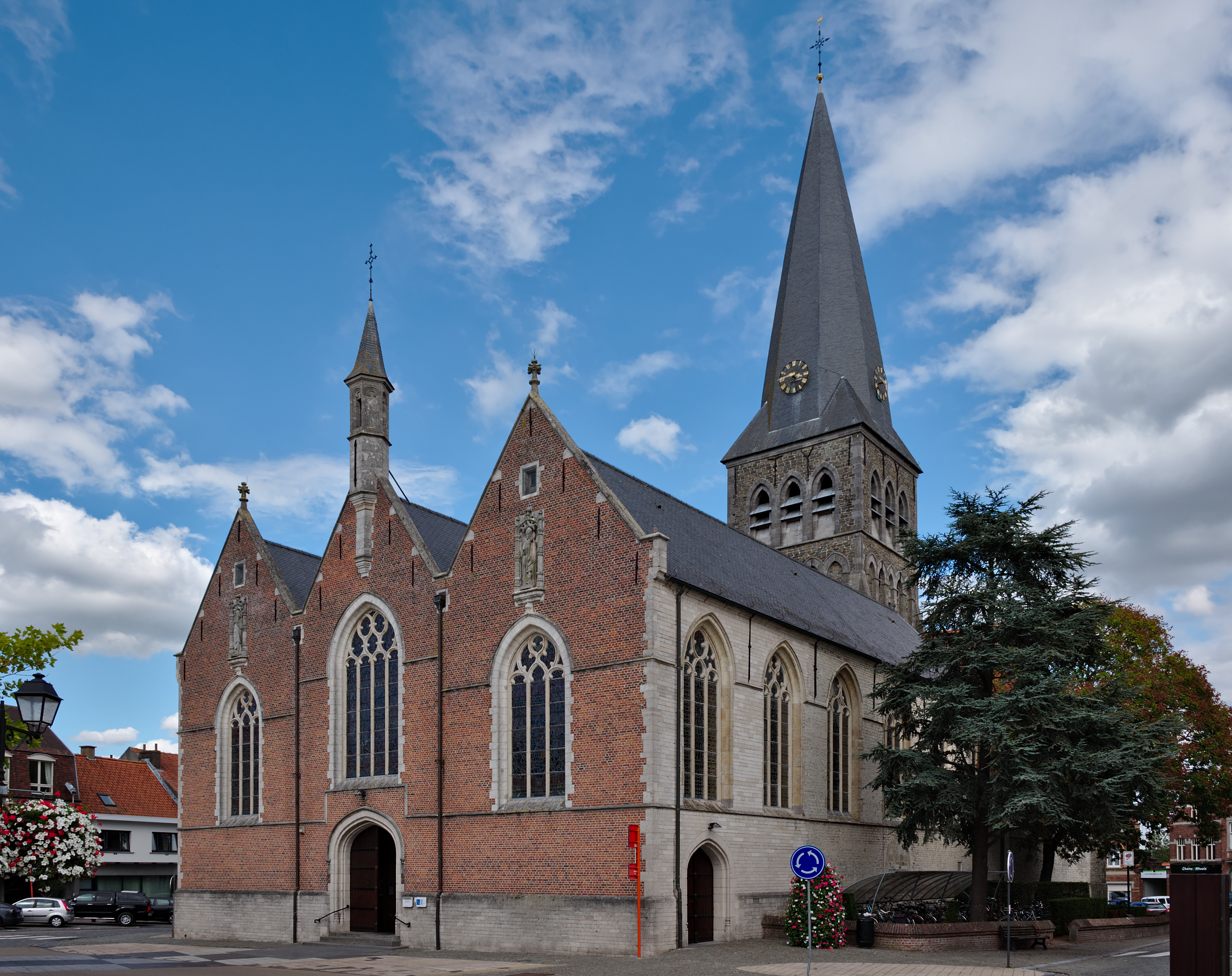
St. Martin's church in Zomergem

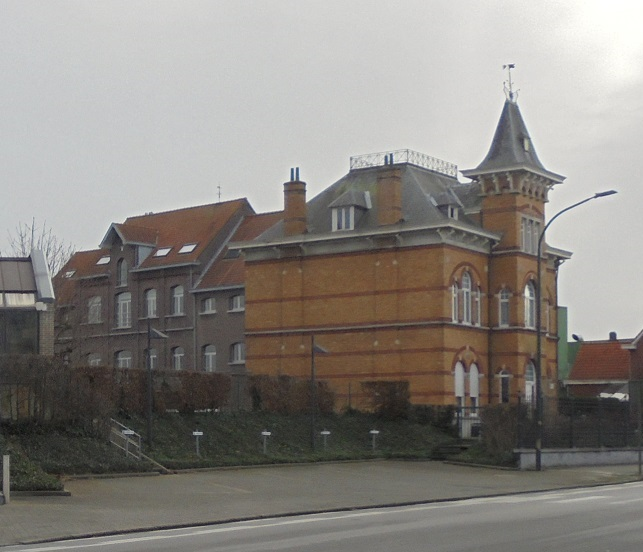
Brewery in Beke

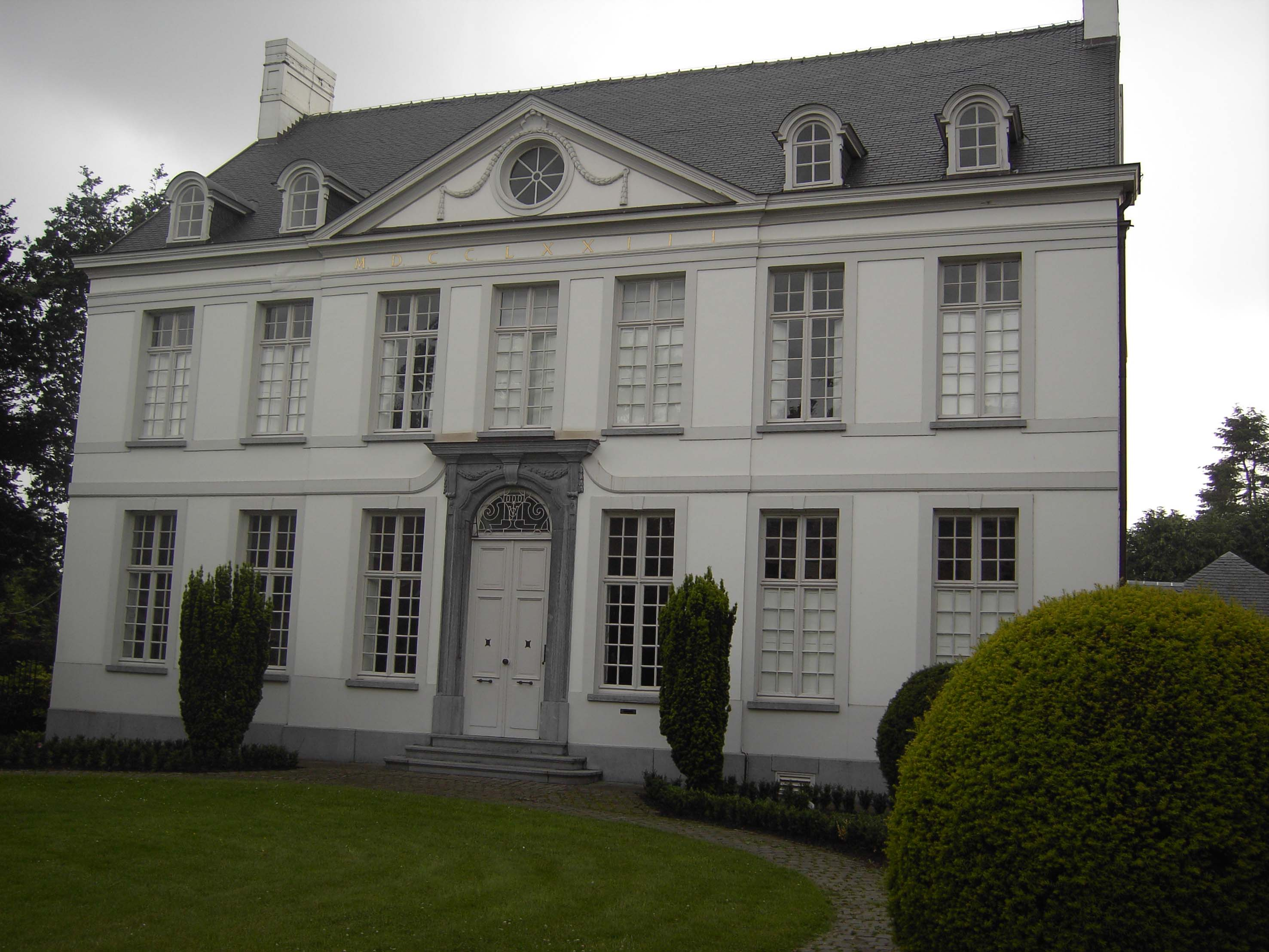
Rectory in Zomergem

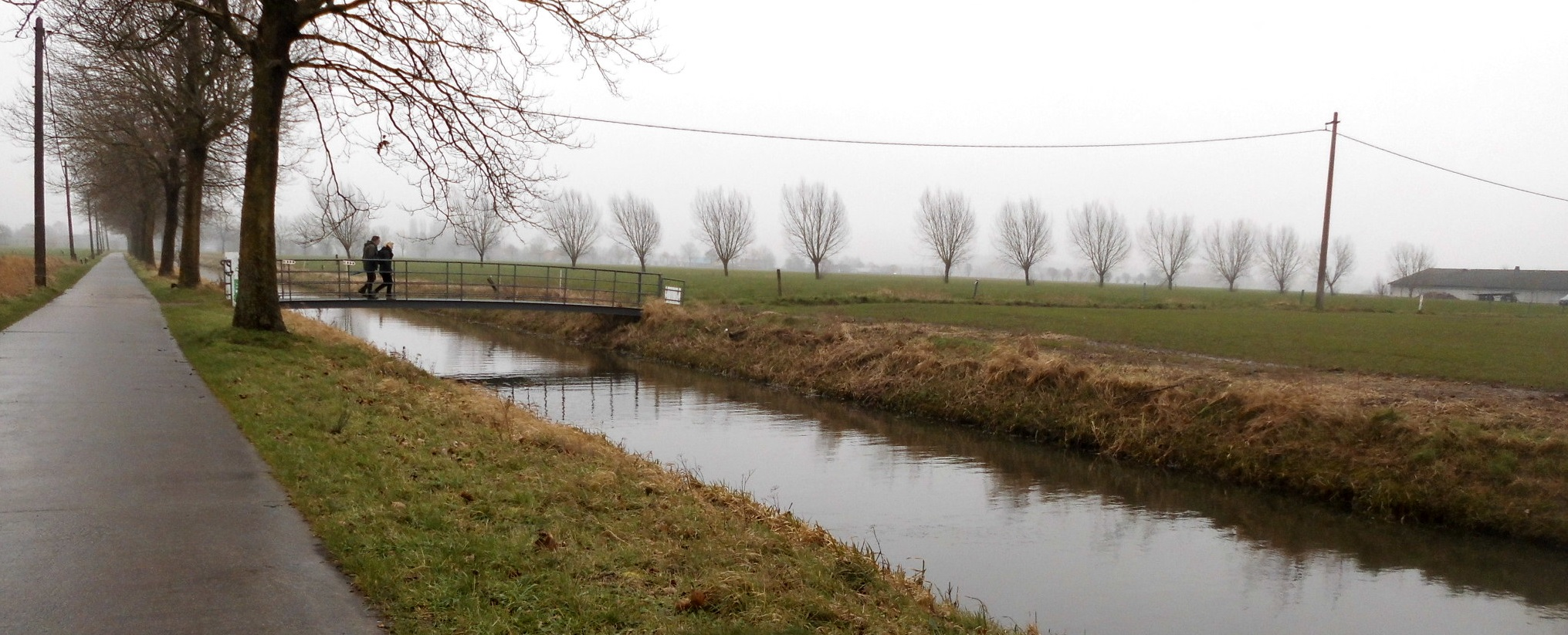
The Lieve Canal
