= Lovendegem =

- Village and former municipality
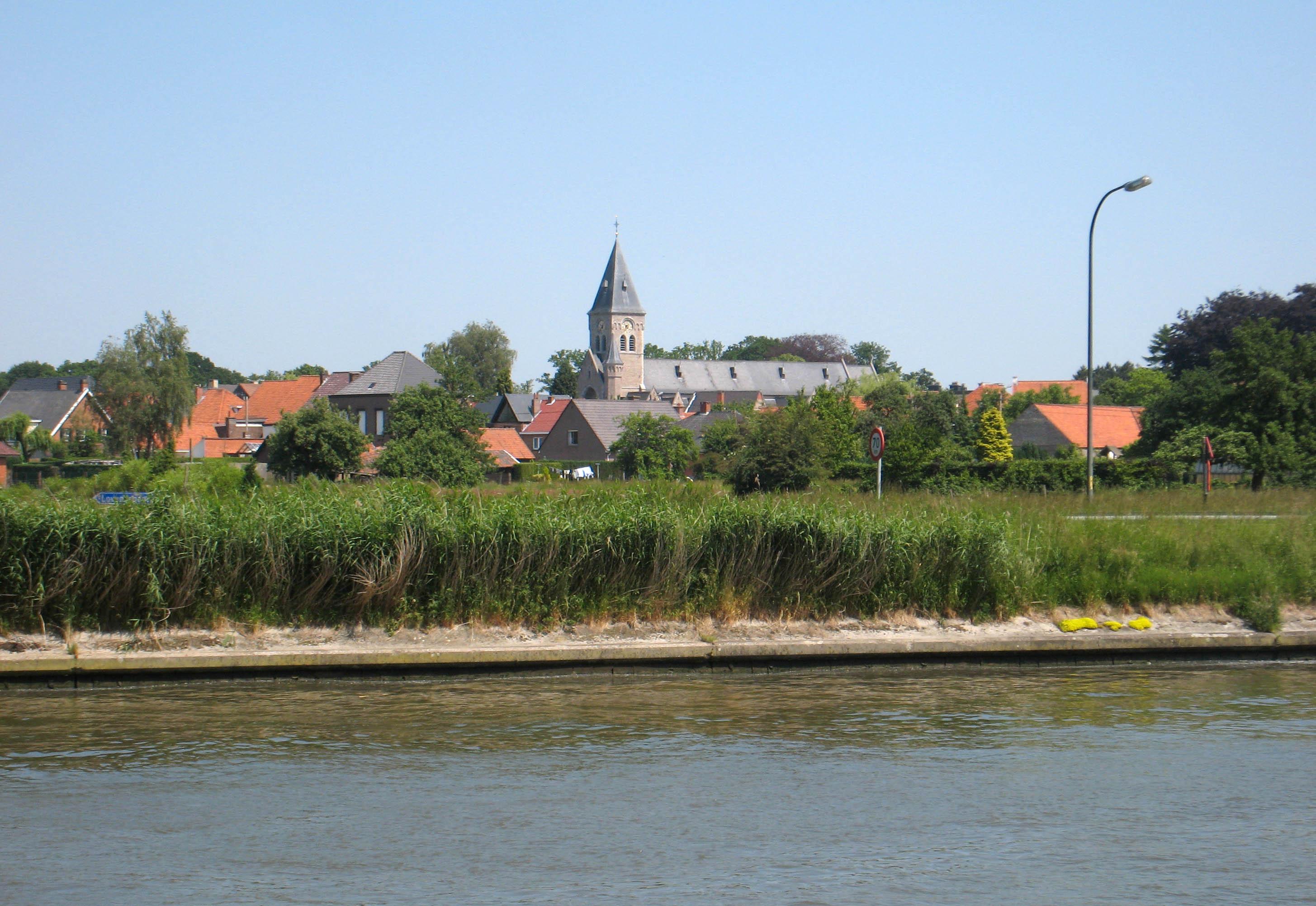
- Lovendegem, seen across the Ghent-Bruges Canal

- Flag Seal

- Location in Belgium
- Coordinates: 51°06′N 03°36′E
- Country: Belgium
- Region: Flemish Region
- Province: East Flanders
- Arrondissement: Ghent
- Municipality: Lievegem

Area
  - Total: 19.55 km^{2} (7.55 sq mi)

Population (2021)
  - Total: 9,703
  - Density: 496.3/km^{2} (1,285/sq mi)
- Time zone: CET
- Postal code: 9920, 9921
- Dialing code: 09
- Website: www.lievegem.be

Lovendegem (Dutch pronunciation: [loːˈvɛndəɣɛm]) is a town and former municipality located in Flanders, one of the three regions of Belgium, and in the province of East Flanders. The municipality comprised the towns of Lovendegem proper and Vinderhoute. In 2018, Lovendegem had a total population of 9,574. The total area is 19.48 km^{2}.

== History ==
The name of the town was first recorded as Lovendenghiem in 1150, but there are traces of human settlements back to the Iron Age. The name means "settlement of the people of Lubantos (person)". Lovendegem used to be a complicated patchwork of heerlijkheden (landed estates) and one barony. The religious wars of the late 16th century and the subsequent repression by the Iron Duke caused a near abandonment of Lovendegem. For most of its history, it was an agricultural community. From the 1960s onwards, Lovendegem developed into a residential town. and experienced a steady population growth.

The Ghent-Bruges Canal crosses the municipality, with the town of Lovendegem to the north of the canal, and Vinderhoute to the south.

Effective 1 January 2019, Waarschoot, Lovendegem and Zomergem were merged into the new municipality of Lievegem.

== Gallery ==
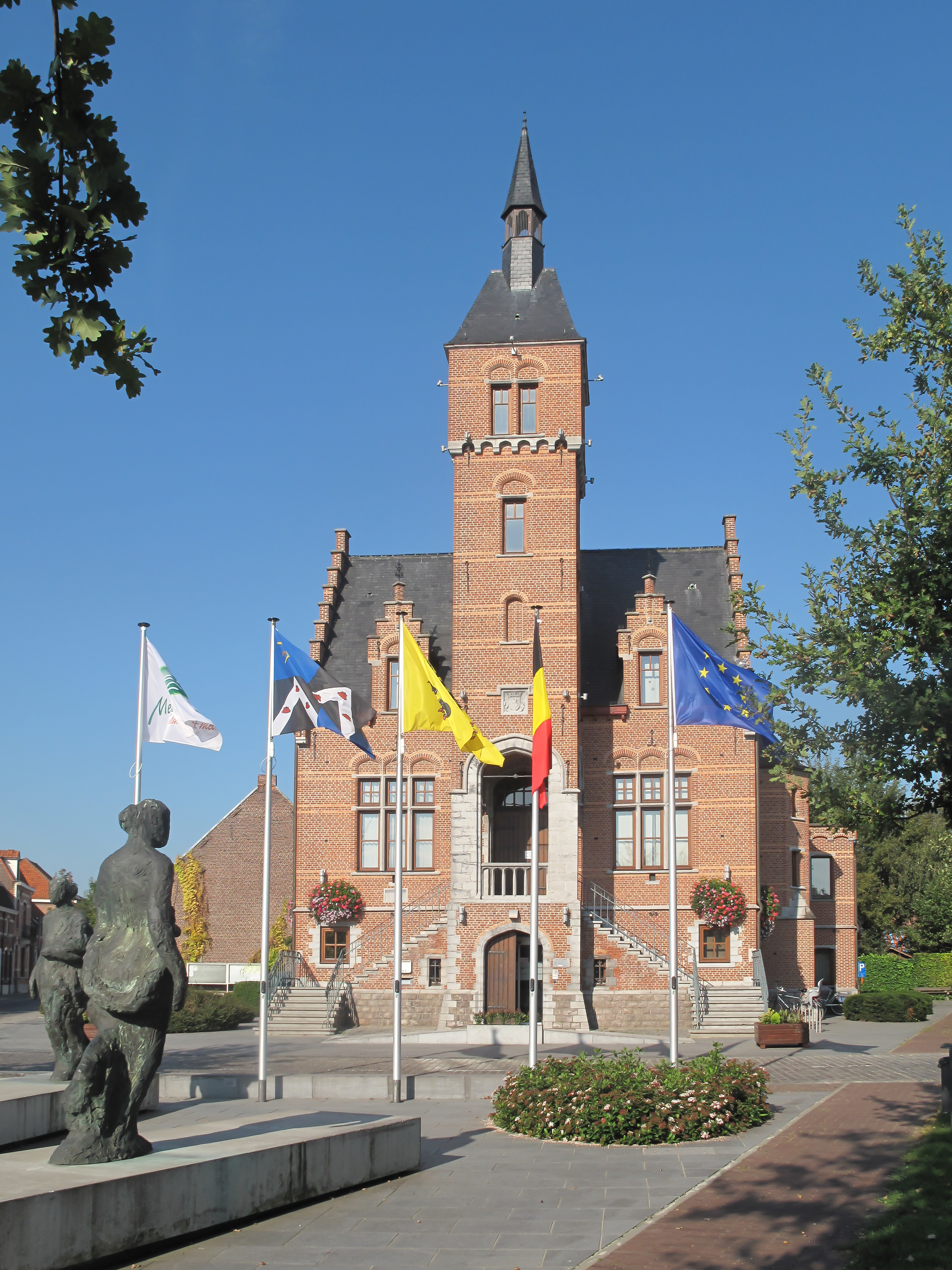
Lovendegem, townhall

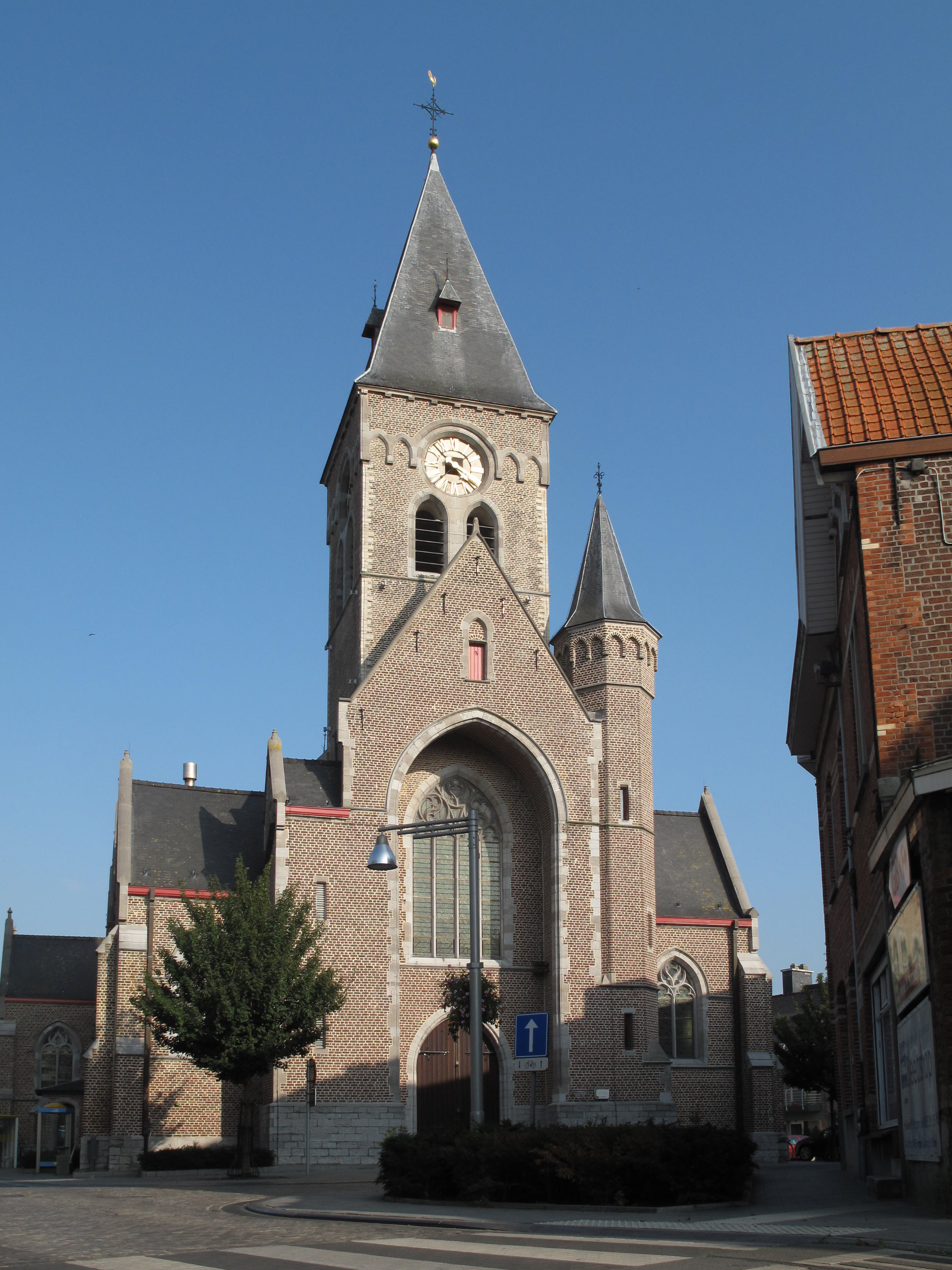
Lovendegem, church: Sint Martinuskerk

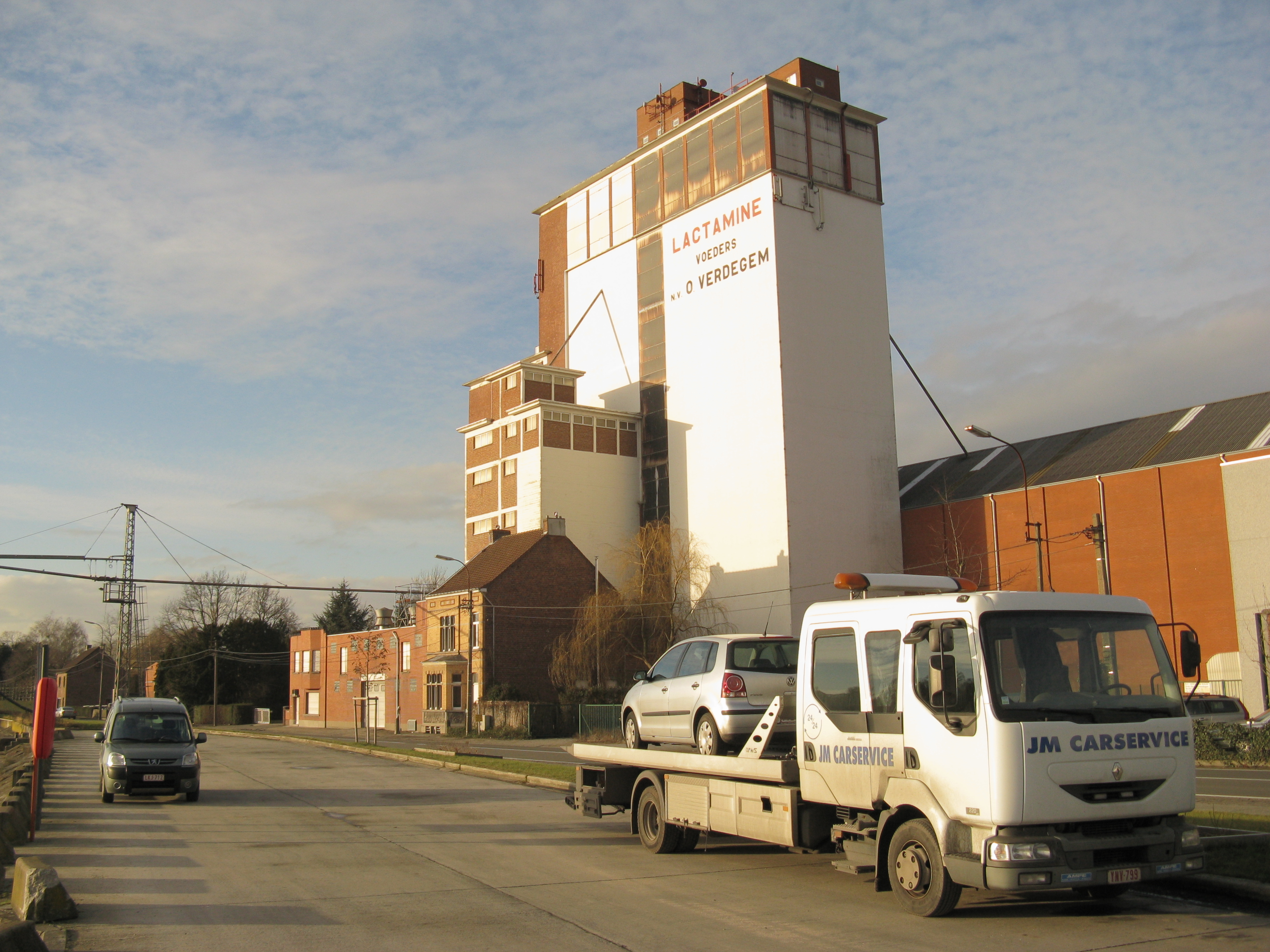
Industry

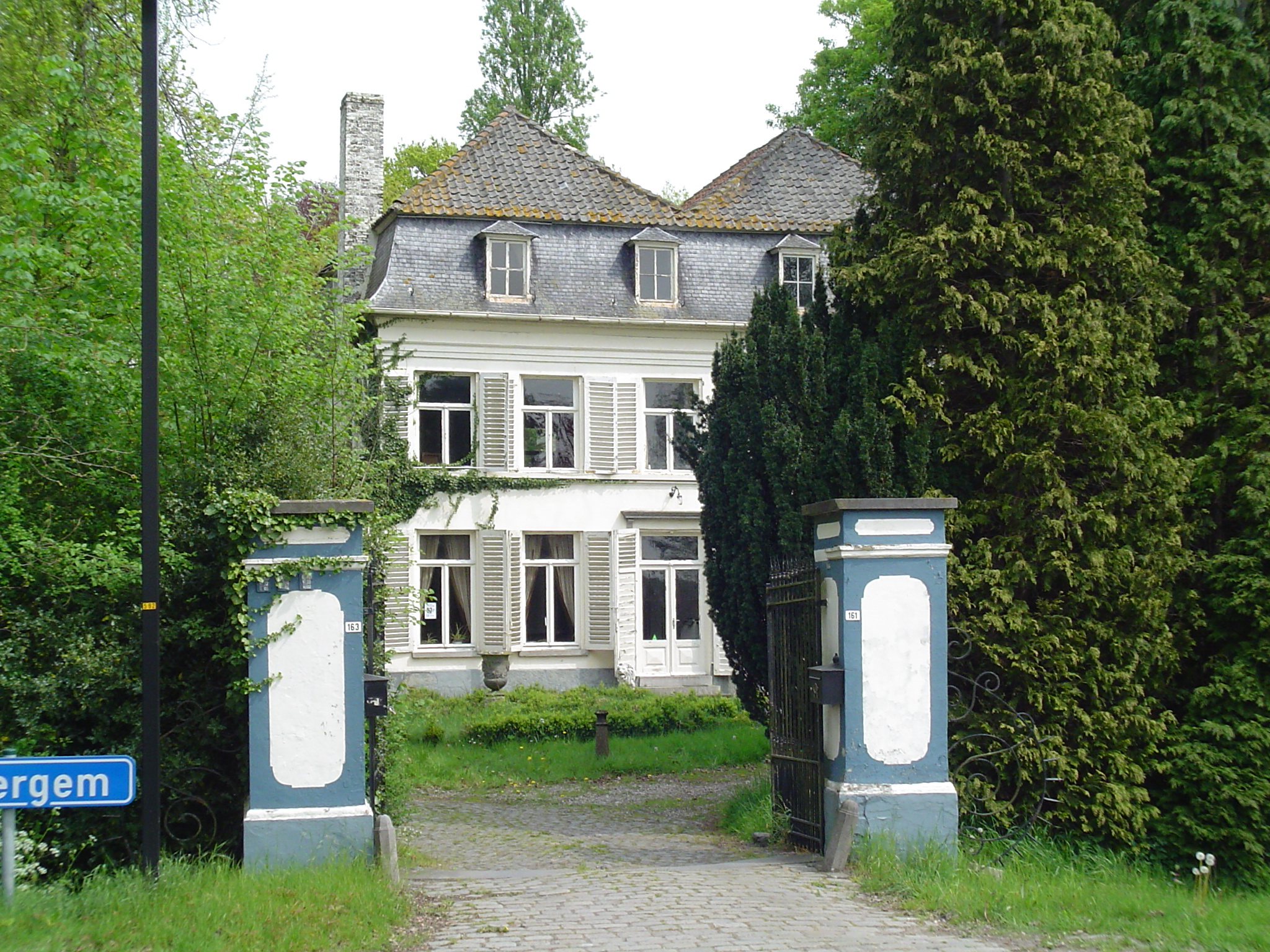
Villa in Lovendegem

== Famous inhabitants ==
- Maurice De Waele, cyclist, winner of the Tour de France
