= Nazareth-De Pinte =

Municipality in East Flanders, Belgium

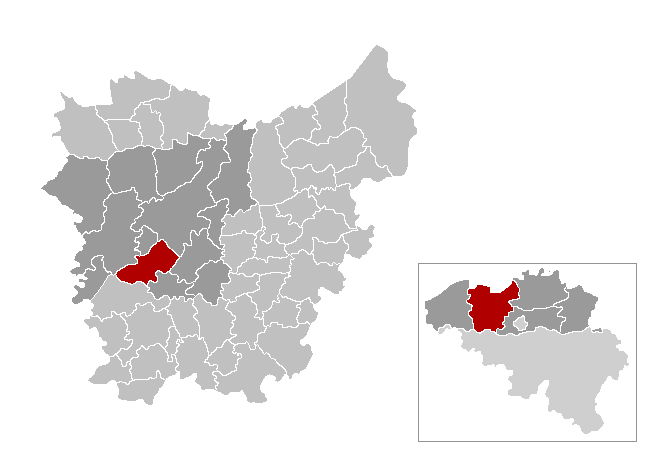
Location

Nazareth-De Pinte is a new municipality in the Belgian province of East Flanders.

It formed on January 1, 2025, when the towns of Nazareth and De Pinte merged.
