= Frédéric-Christophe d'Houdetot =

French politician and artist

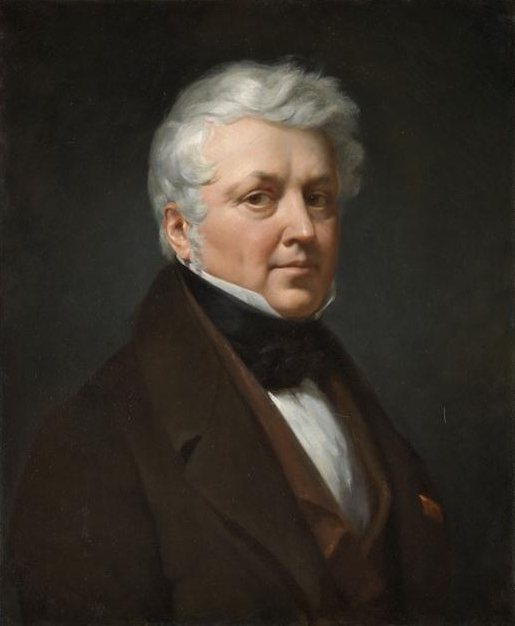
Self-portrait (date unknown)

Frédéric-Christophe, Comte d'Houdetot (16 May 1778 – 20 January 1859) was a French politician, member of the Chamber of Peers, and artist.

== Biography ==
He was born in Paris. He was the son of General César Louis d'Houdetot, and his first wife, Louise Perrinet de Faugnes, who died in 1781 at the age of twenty-three. His father was serving overseas, so he was raised by his grandmother, Sophie d'Houdetot, known for her brief affair with Rousseau. He was conscripted in 1798, and spent some time as a cannoneer. After his service, he found himself attracted to art; frequenting the workshops of Jean-Baptiste Regnault and Jacques-Louis David.

In 1806, he was appointed an auditor at the Conseil d'État. After the Battle of Jena, he was named head of the Prussian tax administration in Berlin. His return to France was followed by a series of appointments; notably as Prefect of Escaut (1809), and Prefect of Dyle (1813).

Back in Paris, after French troops had evacuated Brussels, he indulged his interest in painting. He was again appointed Prefect, in 1815, this time of Loiret, but refused to accept the position. Later, he accepted a temporary position as Prefect of Calvados. There, he managed to protect the citizens against the demands of the Prussians, who occupied the department and threatened to send him to Germany. He was also challenged by an Ultra-royalist faction. Eventually, he was appointed to the Ministry of the Interior.

In 1819, he was named a Peer of France. He continued to work as an artist and, in 1841, was elected to the Académie des Beaux-Arts, where he became the second person to occupy Seat #9 in the "Unattached" section. In 1849, he was chosen to represent Calvados in the legislature. Two years later, he was a supporter of the coup that turned President Louis-Napoléon Bonaparte into Emperor Napoléon III.

== Sources ==
- Adolphe Robert and Gaston Cougny, "Frédéric-Christophe d'Houdetot", in Dictionnaire des parlementaires français (1789–1891), Bourloton, 1891 (Online)
- Vicomte J.-E. de Steins, Notice biographique sur M. le Cte de Houdetot (Frédéric-Christophe), Panthéon Biographique Universel, 1852 (Online)
