= Merelbeke-Melle =

Municipality in East Flanders, Belgium

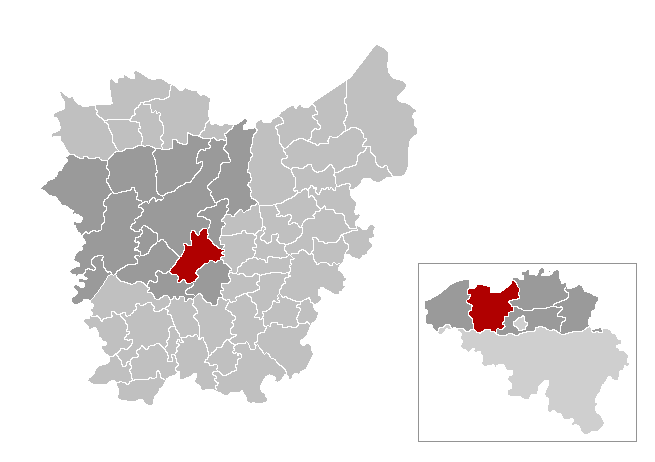
Location

Merelbeke-Melle is a municipality located in the Belgian province of East Flanders.

Merelbeke-Melle is the result of the merger of Merelbeke and Melle on January 1, 2025.
