= Waarschoot =

- Village and former municipality
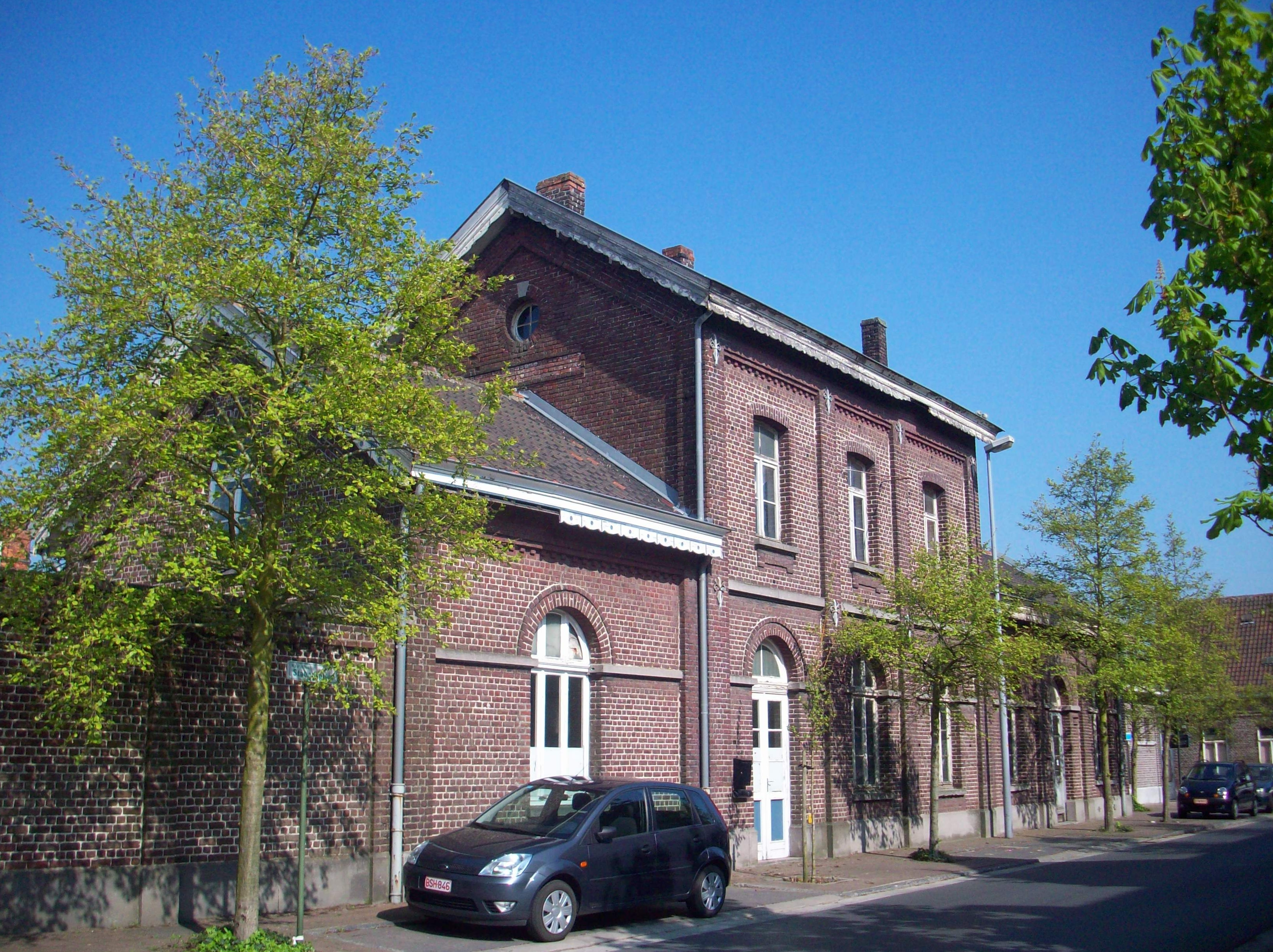
- Station Waarschoot

- Flag Seal

- Location in Belgium
- Coordinates: 51°09′N 03°36′E
- Country: Belgium
- Region: Flemish Region
- Province: East Flanders
- Arrondissement: Ghent
- Municipality: Lievegem

Area
  - Total: 21.94 km^{2} (8.47 sq mi)

Population (2021)
  - Total: 8,194
  - Density: 373.5/km^{2} (967.3/sq mi)
- Time zone: CET
- Postal code: 9950
- Dialing code: 09
- Website: www.lievegem.be

Waarschoot (Dutch pronunciation: [ˈʋaːrsxoːt]) is a town and former municipality located in the Flemish province of East Flanders, in Belgium. The municipality comprised the towns of Waarschoot proper. In 2018, Waarschoot had a total population of 7,967. The total area is 21.91 km^{2} (8.46 sq mi).

Until 31 December 2018, Waarschoot was one of the few Belgian municipalities having a female mayor. Her name is Ann Coopman.

Effective 1 January 2019, Waarschoot, Lovendegem, and Zomergem were merged into the new municipality of Lievegem, with only one mayor remaining, Tony Vermeire (CD&V).

== Gallery ==
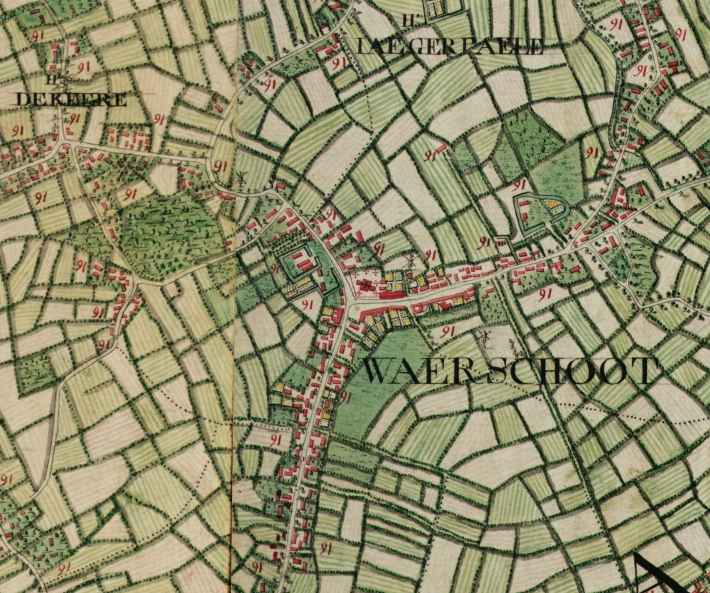
Waarschoot on the Ferraris map (around 1775)

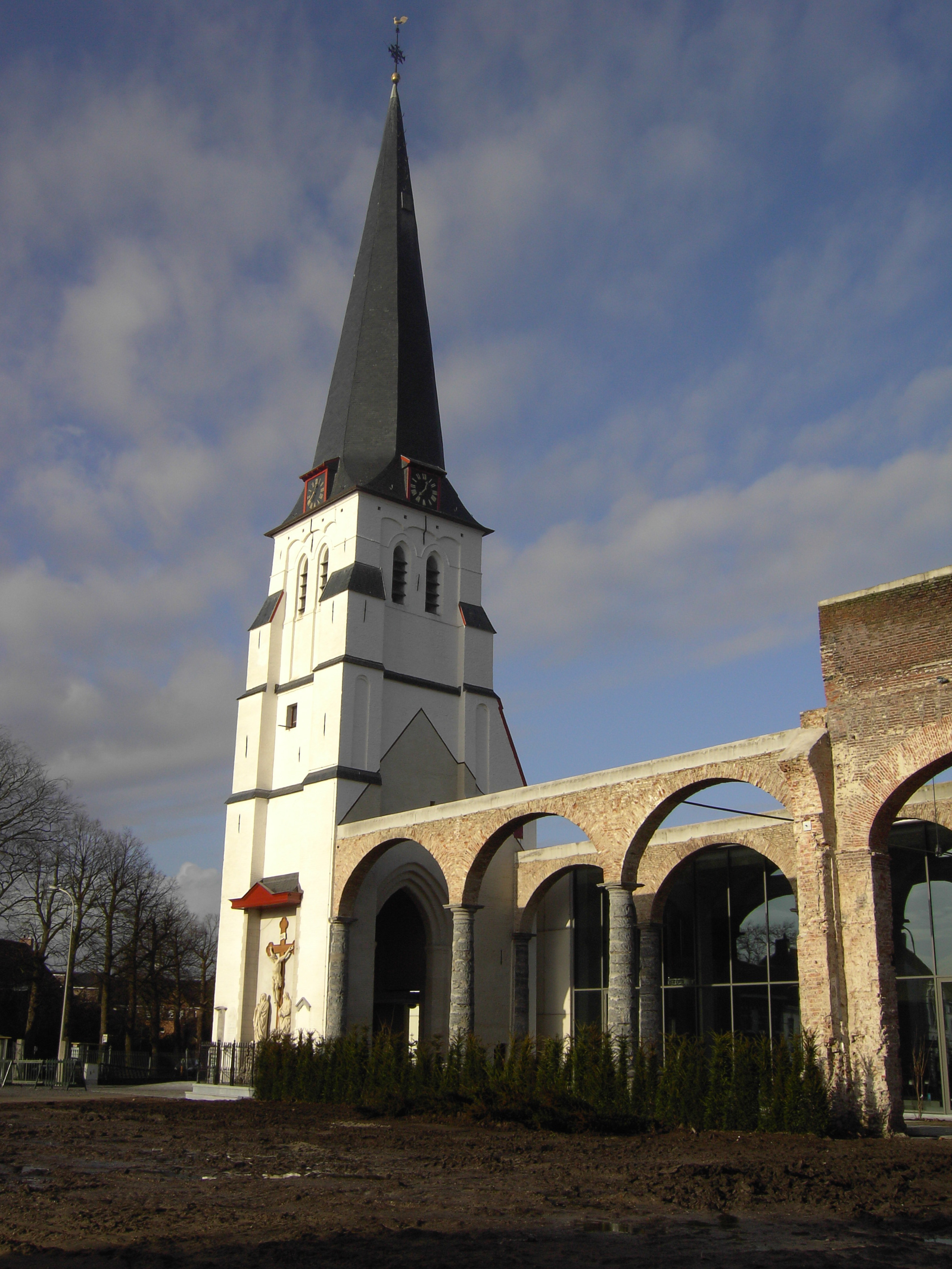
Church of Saint Ghislenus in Waarschot. Tower and ruins of the former church

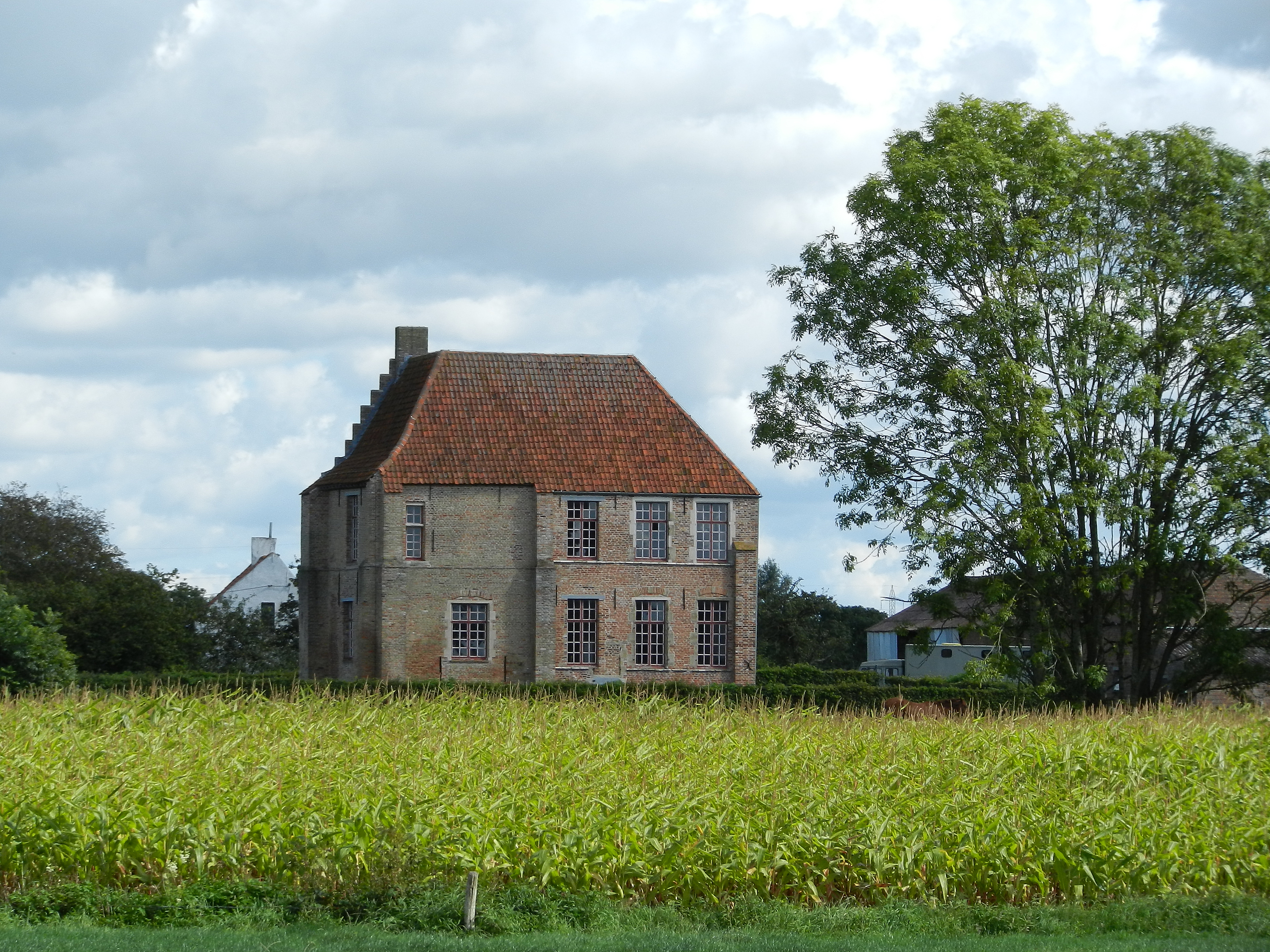
Rattenkasteel (Rat Castle)

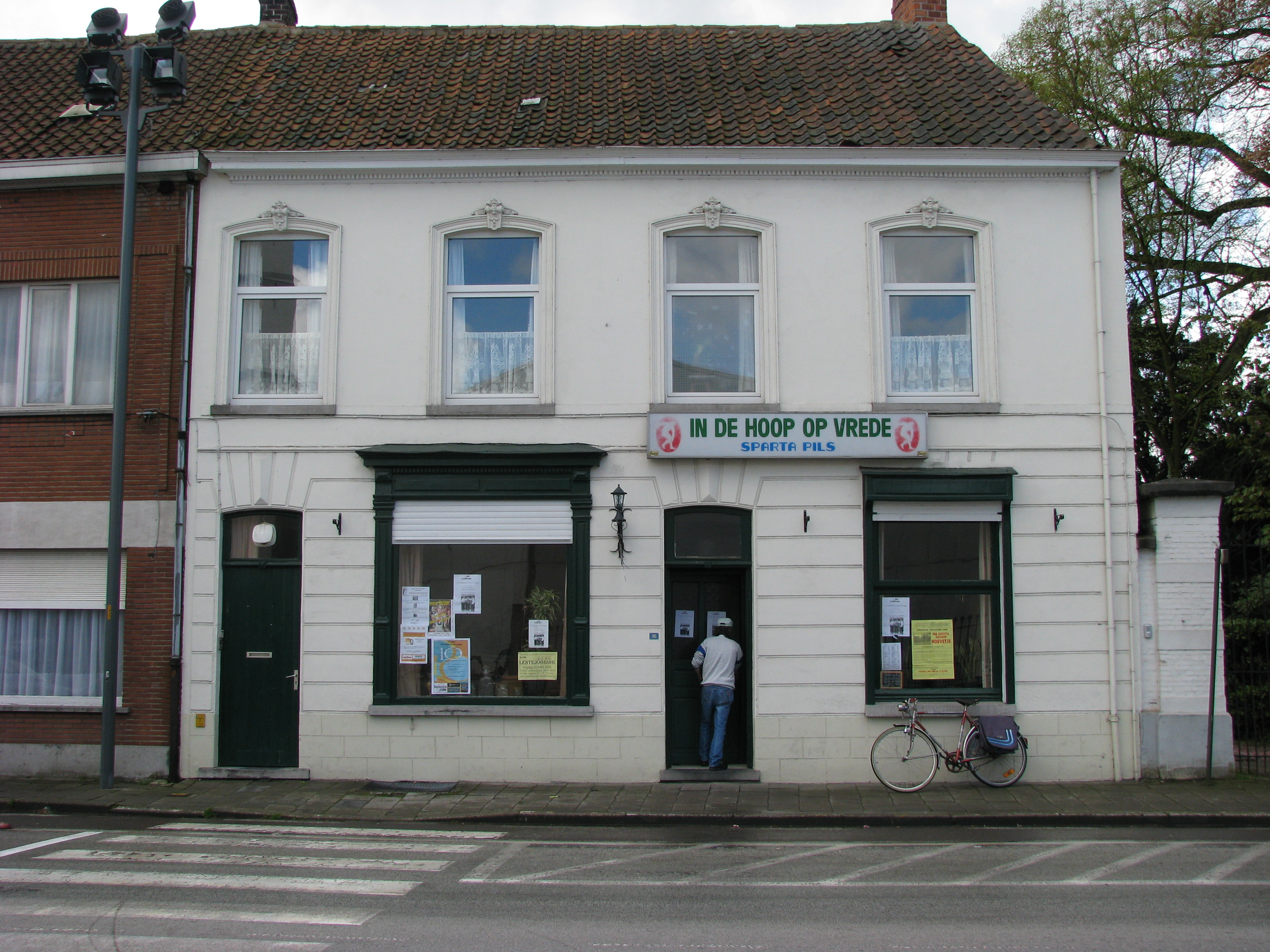
Pub in Waarschot
