= André Denys =

Belgian politician

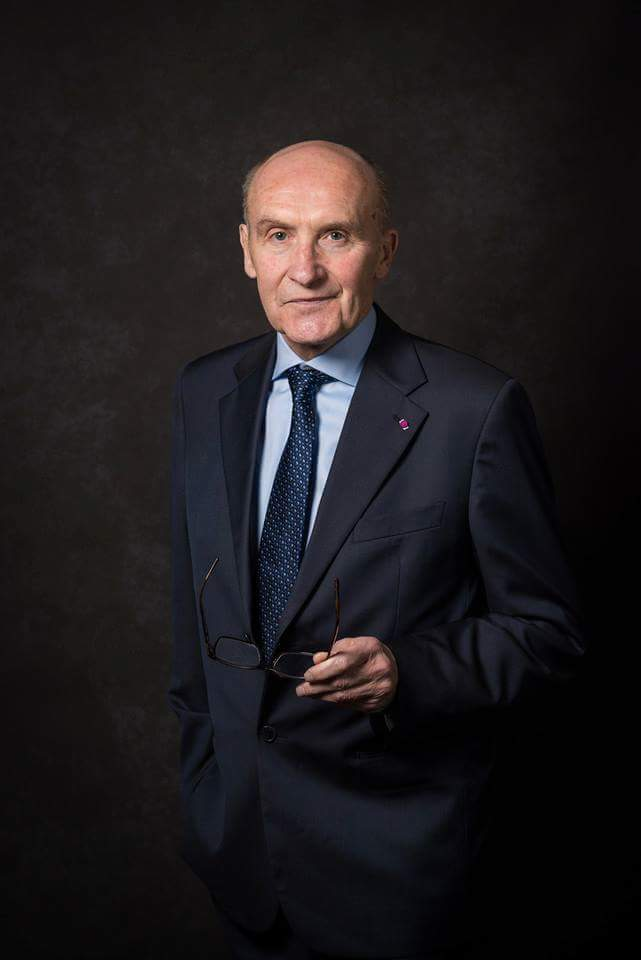

André C. Denys (6 January 1948 in Gistel – 13 May 2013 in Ghent) was a Belgian politician who was the Governor of the province of East Flanders from 2004 to January 2013.
