= Nazareth, Belgium =

Nazareth
- Municipality
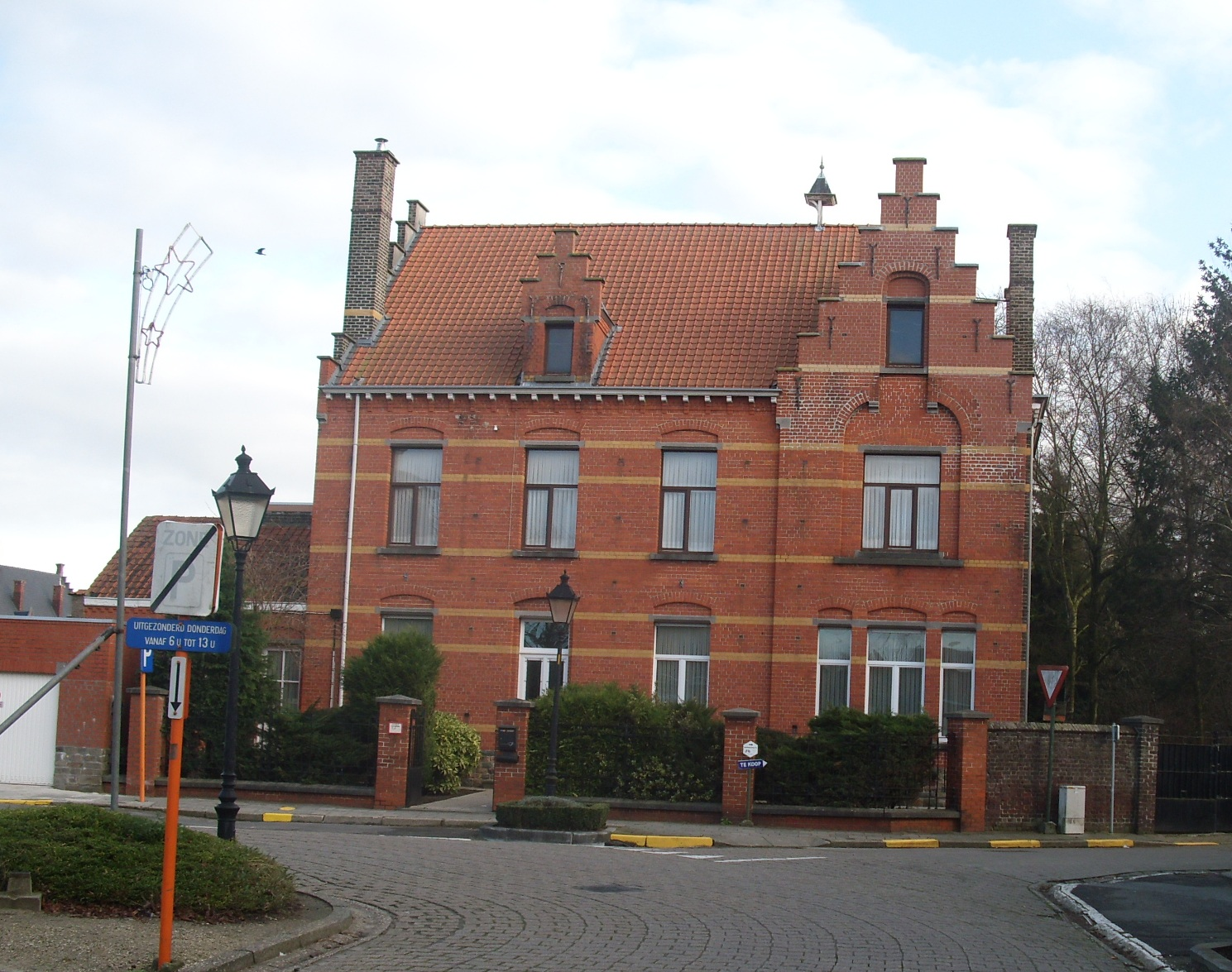

- Flag Coat of arms

- Location of Nazareth in East Flanders
- Interactive map of Nazareth
- Location in Belgium
- Coordinates: 50°58′N 03°36′E
- Country: Belgium
- Community: Flemish Community
- Region: Flemish Region
- Province: East Flanders
- Arrondissement: Ghent

Government
  - Mayor: Danny Claeys (CD&V)
  - Governing parties: CD&V, Vooruit-Groen

Population (2018-01-01)
  - Total: 11,574
- Postal codes: 9810
- NIS code: 44048
- Area codes: 09
- Website: www.nazareth.be

Nazareth (Dutch pronunciation: [ˈnaːzaːrɛt]) is a former municipality located in the Belgian province of East Flanders. The municipality comprises the towns of Eke and Nazareth proper. In 2021, Nazareth had a total population of 11,844. The total area is 35.19 km^{2} which gives a population density of 320 inhabitants per km^{2}.

== Etymology ==
There are various hypotheses for the origin of the name "Nazareth", dated to a text of songs from 1259 CE. It is possible that Nazareth was named after the biblical city of Nazareth. It is also possible, but less likely, that Nazareth was originally a slip of the word magherhet (thinness).

== History ==
The community was first recorded in 1259.

== Heraldry ==
The arms of Nazareth is a composition of two family crests:

The first part is the arms of the family Rockolfing: three gold roses geknopt throat in the field, vert scrolled head and a shield charged with a throat depth and looking round lion of gold, tongued gules.

The second part is the escutcheon of the family Kervyn Volkaersbeke: saber in a twill together right in the head by an acorn, stemmed and browsed in two pieces, left in the mind of a six-pointed star, everything from gold and the one point eagle leg of silver.

== Sights ==
- 19th-century church (1861 – 1870)
