= Zomergem =

- Village and former municipality
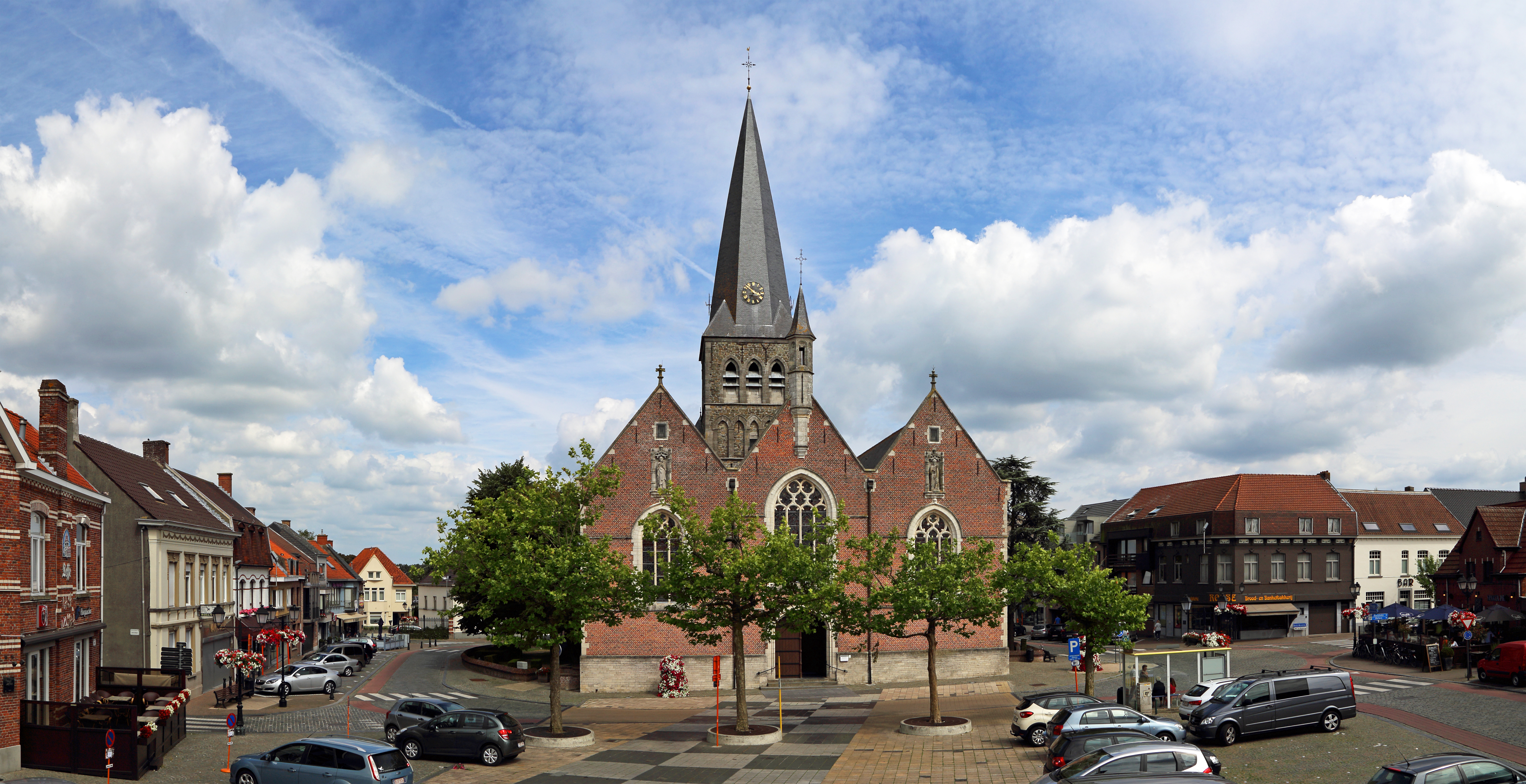
- Zomergem: Market Place and St Martin's church

- Flag Seal

- Location in Belgium
- Coordinates: 51°07′N 03°33′E
- Country: Belgium
- Region: Flemish Region
- Province: East Flanders
- Arrondissement: Ghent
- Municipality: Lievegem

Area
  - Total: 39.29 km^{2} (15.17 sq mi)

Population (2021)
  - Total: 8,544
  - Density: 217.5/km^{2} (563.2/sq mi)
- Time zone: CET
- Postal code: 9930-9932
- Dialing code: 09
- Website: www.lievegem.be

Zomergem (Dutch pronunciation: [ˈzoːmərɣɛm]) is a town and former municipality located in the Flanders and in the province of East Flanders, in Belgium. The municipality comprises the towns of Oostwinkel, Ronsele and Zomergem proper. On 1 January 2018, Zomergem had a total population of 8,466. The total area is 38.78 km^{2}.

Effective 1 January 2019, Waarschoot, Lovendegem and Zomergem were merged into the new municipality of Lievegem.

== Gallery ==
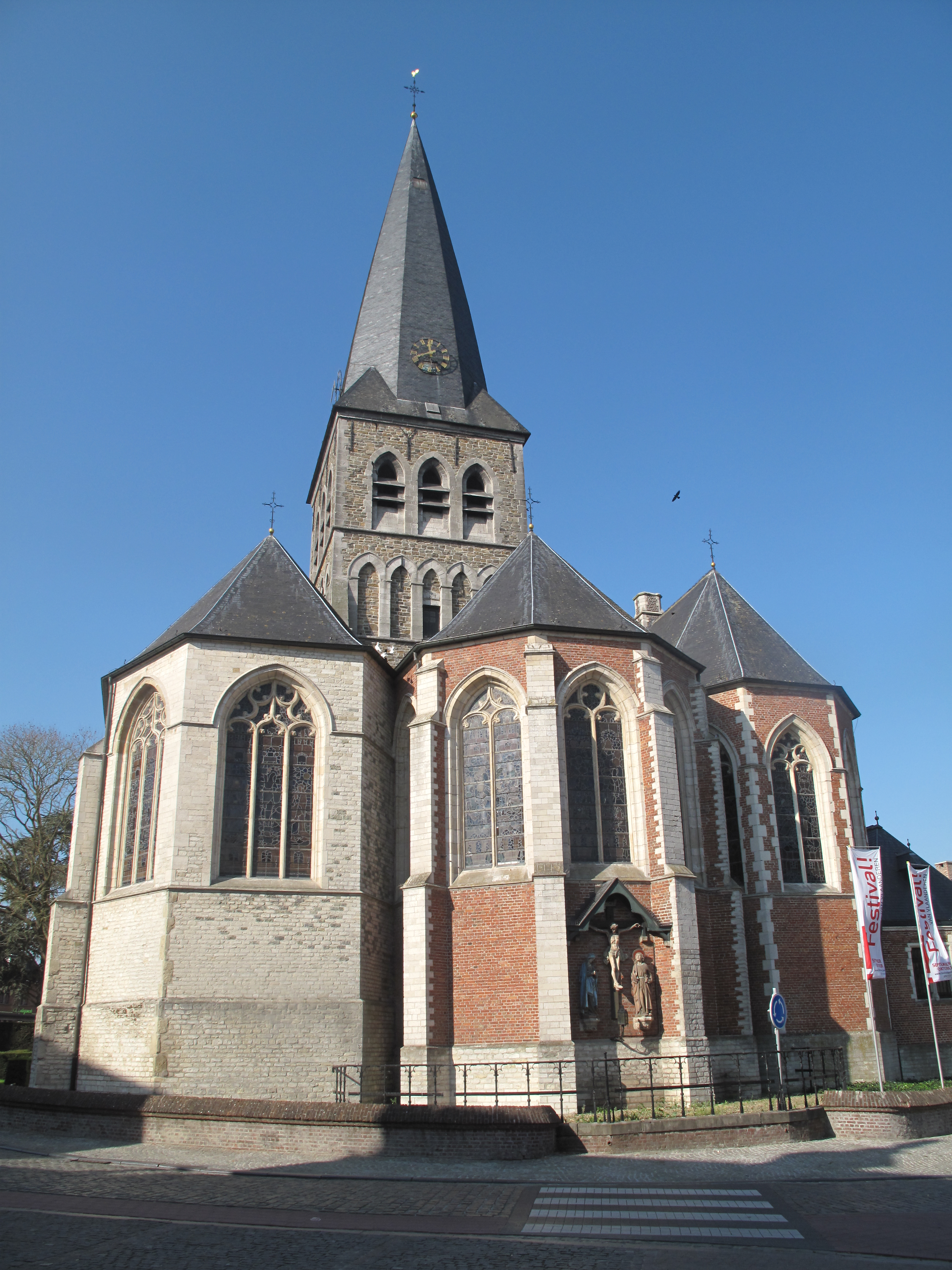
Zomergem, St Martin's church

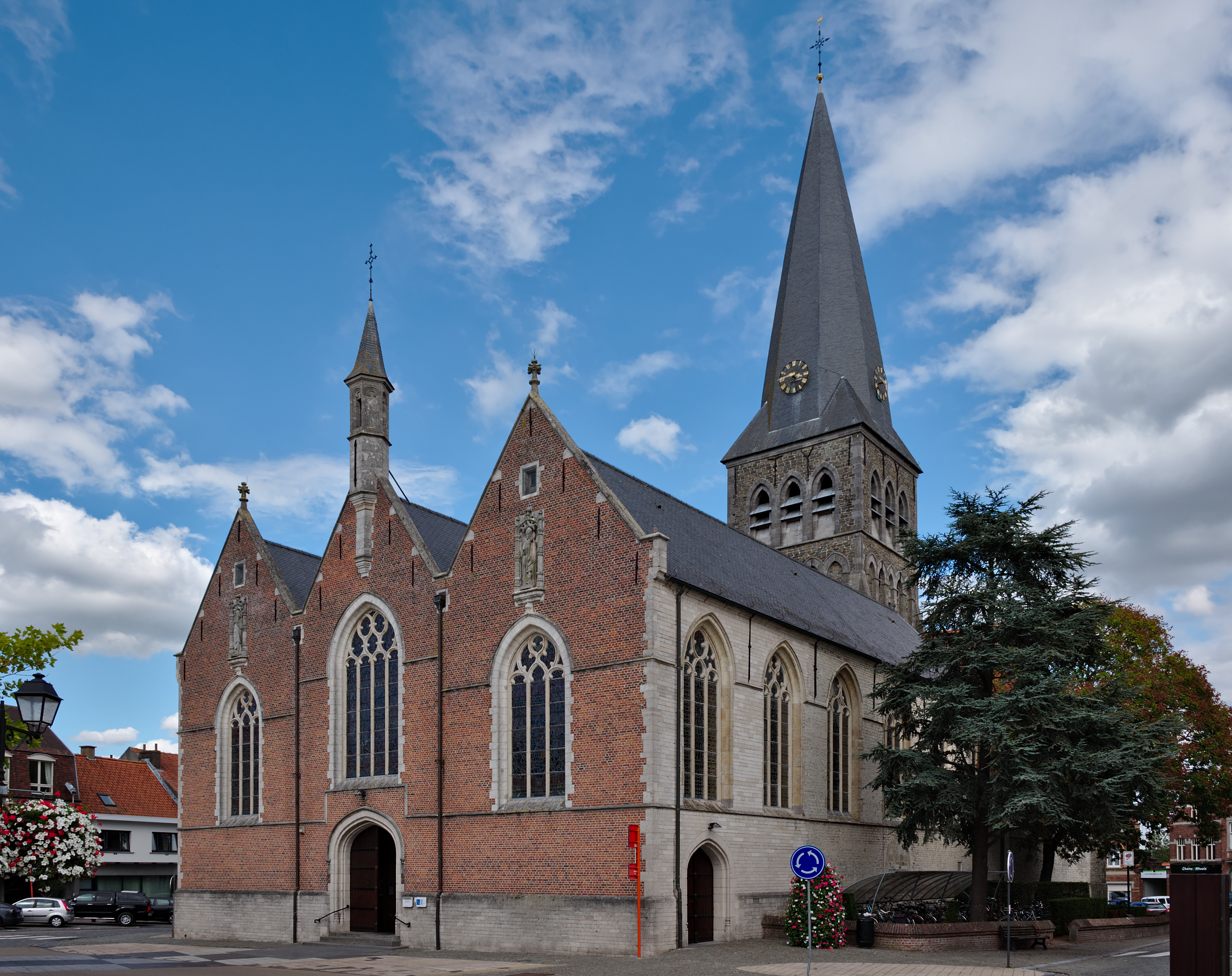
St Martin's church

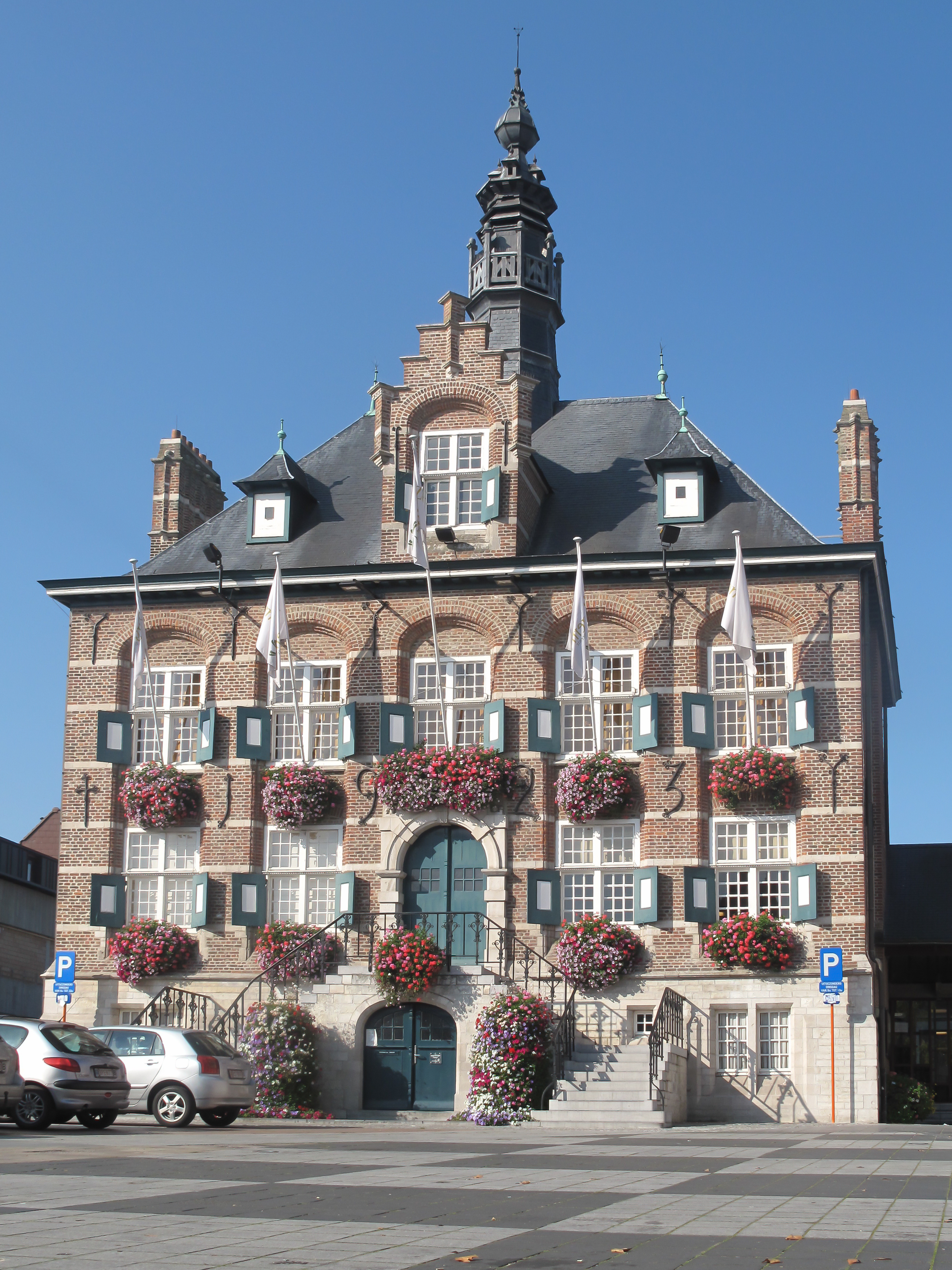
Zomergem, townhall

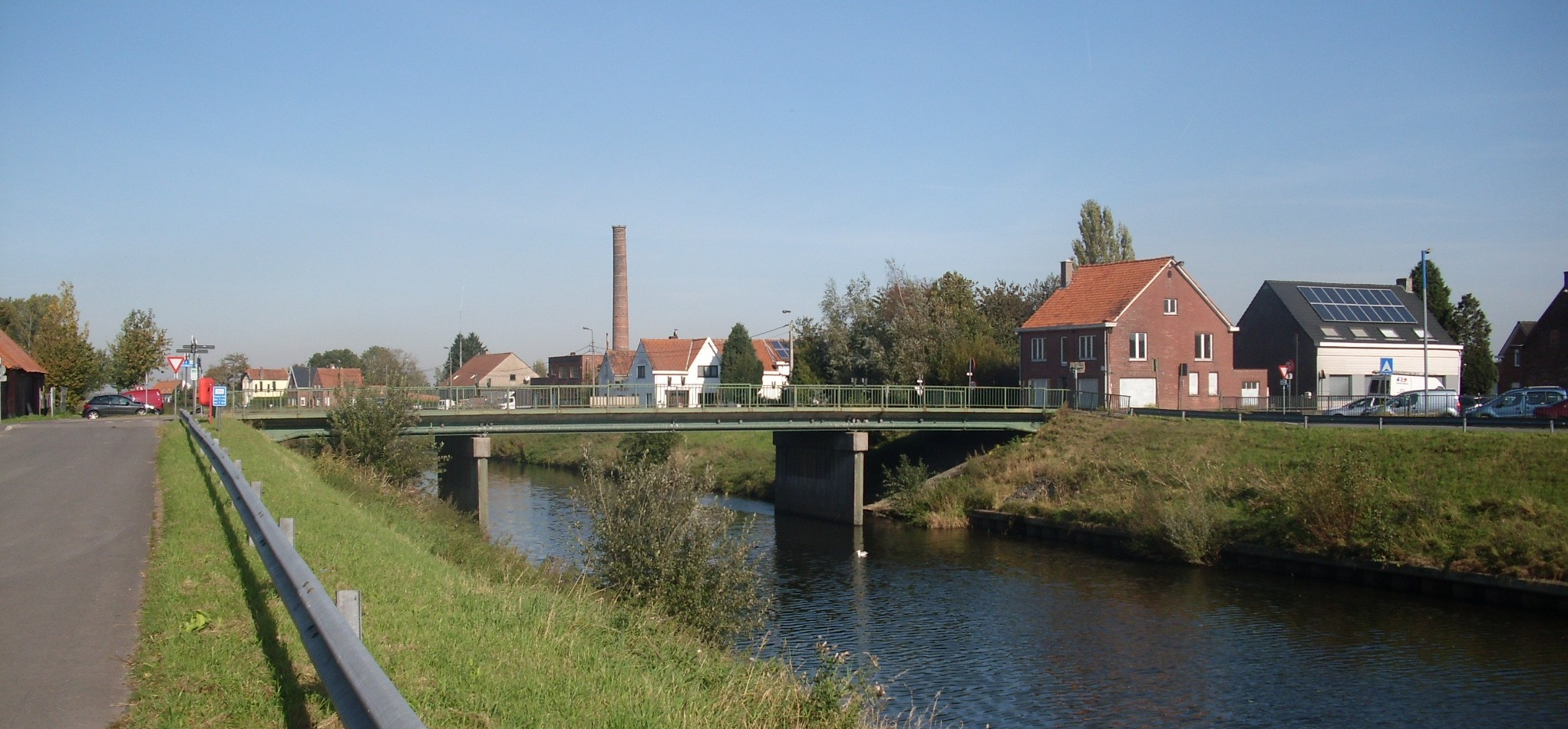
Motjes bridge on the Schipdonk canal
