= Oosterzele =

- Municipality
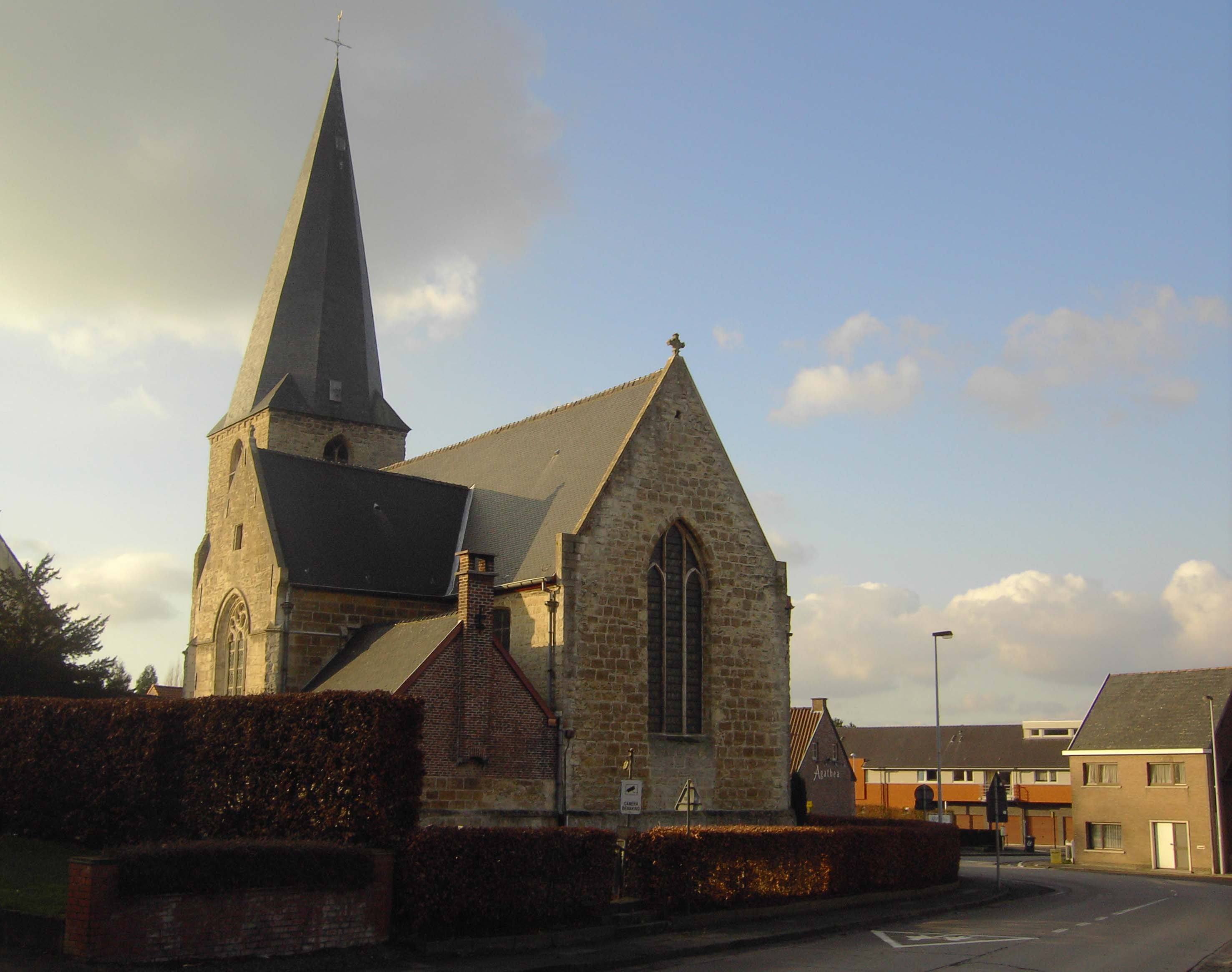
- Church of Landskouter (2008)

- Flag Coat of arms

- Location of Oosterzele in East Flanders
- Interactive map of Oosterzele
- Location in Belgium
- Coordinates: 50°57′N 03°48′E
- Country: Belgium
- Community: Flemish Community
- Region: Flemish Region
- Province: East Flanders
- Arrondissement: Ghent

Government
  - Mayor: Orville Cottenie (#pro9860)
  - Governing party: #pro9860/Voluit

Area
  - Total: 43.57 km^{2} (16.82 sq mi)

Population (2018-01-01)
  - Total: 13,546
  - Density: 310.9/km^{2} (805.2/sq mi)
- Postal codes: 9860
- NIS code: 44052
- Area codes: 09
- Website: www.oosterzele.be

Oosterzele (Dutch pronunciation: [ˈoːstərˌzeːlə]) is a municipality located in the Flemish province of East Flanders, in Belgium. The municipality comprises the towns of Balegem, Gijzenzele, Landskouter, Moortsele, Oosterzele proper and Scheldewindeke. In 2021, Oosterzele had a total population of 13,740. The total area is 43.12 km². Its twin town is Oberkirch in Germany.

== Geography ==
Oosterzele is subdivided into 6 sub-municipalities:

#	Deelgemeentes	Area (km²)	Population	Population density
I	Oosterzele
II	Balegem	12,02
III	Scheldewindeke	11,84
IV	Moortsele	3,64
V	Landskouter
VI	Gijzenzele	1,87

== Famous inhabitants ==
- Els De Temmerman, journalist, activist
- Johan Van Hecke, politician
- Gustaaf Joos, Roman Catholic cardinal
- Frans Van De Velde (1909–2002), missionary
- Gerard Vekeman (1933), poet
- Walter Muls (1961), politician
- Tom De Sutter (1985), football player
- Johan Taeldeman, linguist, dialectologist, professor-emeritus UGent
