= East Flanders =

Province of Belgium

East Flanders Oost-Vlaanderen (Dutch) Ôost-Vloandern (West Flemish)
- Province of Belgium
- Flag Coat of arms Brandmark

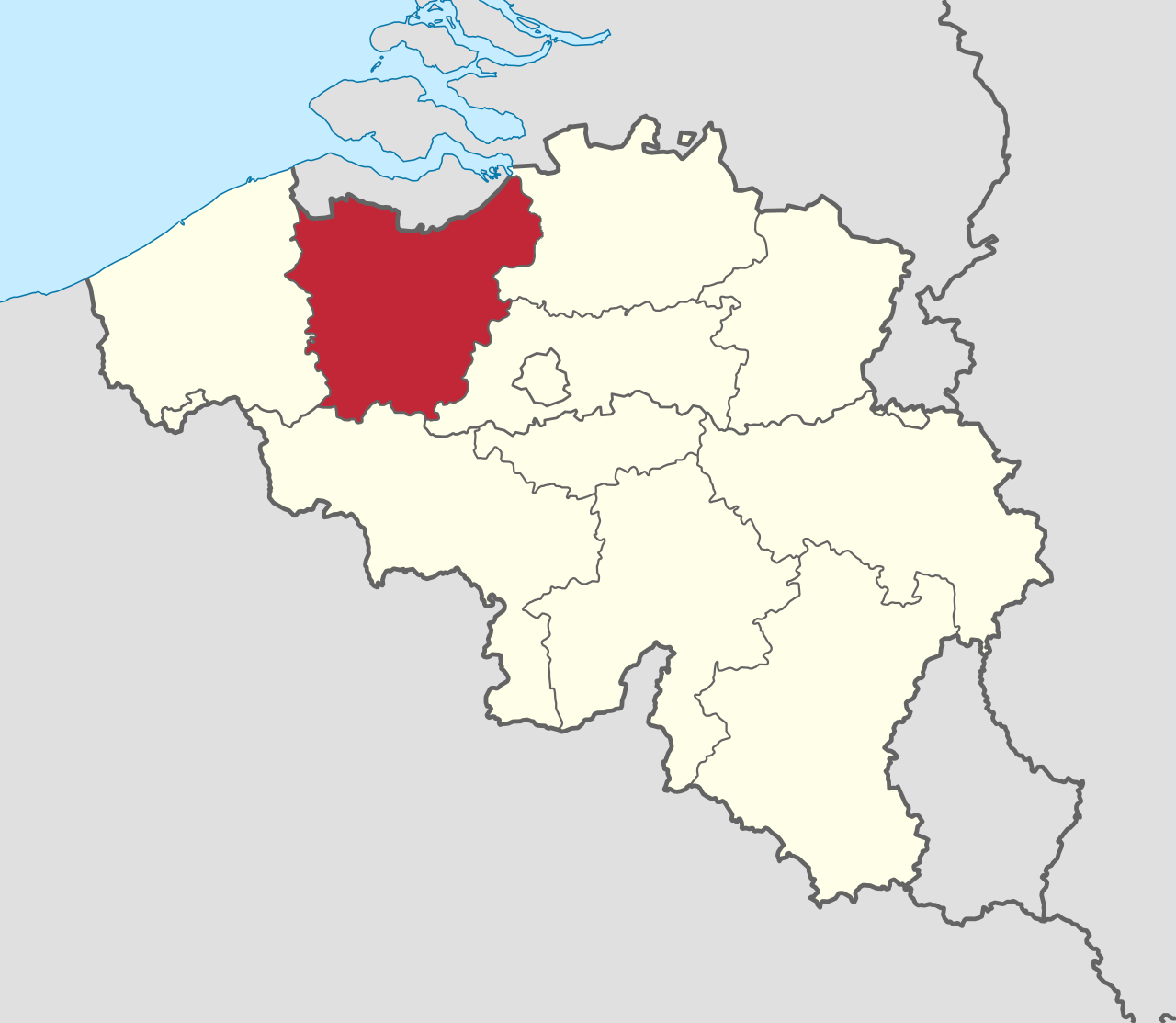
- Interactive map of East Flanders
- Coordinates: 51°00′N 03°45′E
- Country: Belgium
- Region: Flanders
- Capital (and largest city): Ghent

Government
  - Governor: Carina Van Cauter

Area
  - Total: 3,007 km^{2} (1,161 sq mi)

Population (1 January 2024)
  - Total: 1,572,002
  - Density: 522.8/km^{2} (1,354/sq mi)

GDP
  - Total: €78.272 billion (2024)
  - Per capita: €49,352 (2024)
- ISO 3166 code: BE-VOV
- HDI (2021): 0.936 very high · 6th of 11
- Website: www.oost-vlaanderen.be

East Flanders (Note: (Dutch: Oost-Vlaanderen [ˌoːst ˈflaːndərə(n)]; In isolation, Vlaanderen is pronounced [ˈvlaːndərə(n)]. French: Flandre-Orientale [flɑ̃dʁ ɔʁjɑ̃tal]; German: Ostflandern [ˈɔstˌflandɐn]; West Flemish: Ôost-Vloandern)) is a province of Belgium. It borders (clockwise from the North) the Dutch province of Zeeland and the Belgian provinces of Antwerp, Flemish Brabant, Hainaut and West Flanders. It has an area of 3,007 km^{2} (1,161 sq mi), divided into six administrative districts containing 60 municipalities, and a population of over 1.57 million as of January 2024. The capital is Ghent, home to the Ghent University and the Port of Ghent.

== History ==
During the short-lived Napoleonic Empire, most of the area of the modern province was part of the Department of Escaut, named after the River Scheldt. Following the defeat of Napoleon, the entity was renamed after its geographical location in the eastern part of the historic County of Flanders (now in the western portion of the current Flemish Region).

The provincial flag has a black lion with red tongue and claws, on a background of horizontal white and green stripes. This is a recent adaptation; formerly, East Flanders used the Flemish flag, a black lion on a yellow background, as in the current coat of arms. The old flag is still publicly used, e.g. for road signs.

== Geography ==
The province has several geographic or tourist regions:

- Denderstreek
- Meetjesland
- Waasland
- Flemish Ardennes

Important rivers are the Scheldt and the Leie which merge in Ghent. The Dender merges into the Scheldt in the city of Dendermonde.

=== Subdivisions ===
East Flanders is divided into 6 administrative arrondissements (districts), subdivided into a total of 55 municipalities. In addition, there are 3 judicial and 3 electoral arrondissements.

District
Ghent District:
Oudenaarde District:
Eeklo District:
Aalst District:
Dendermonde District:
Sint-Niklaas District:
Location
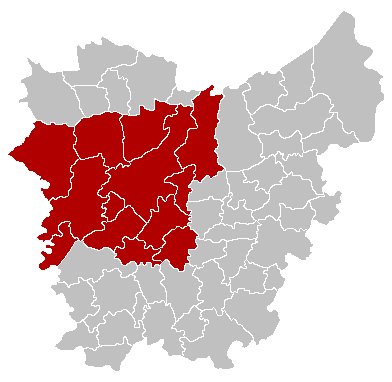
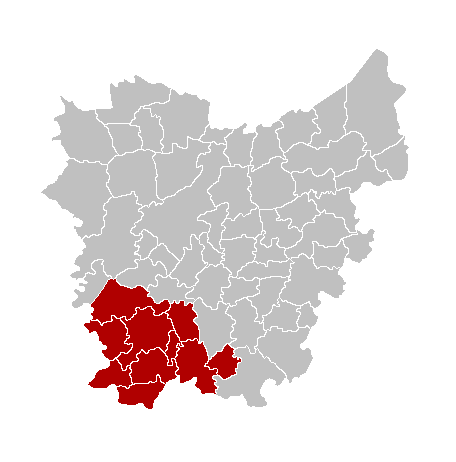
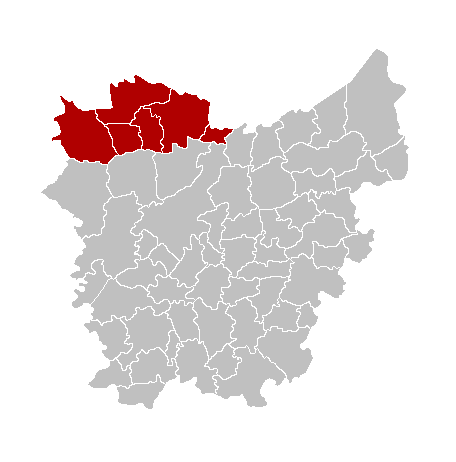
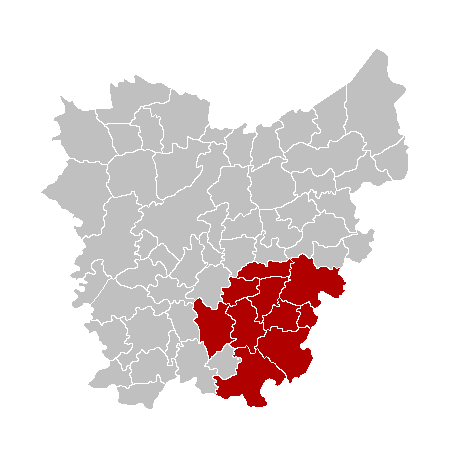
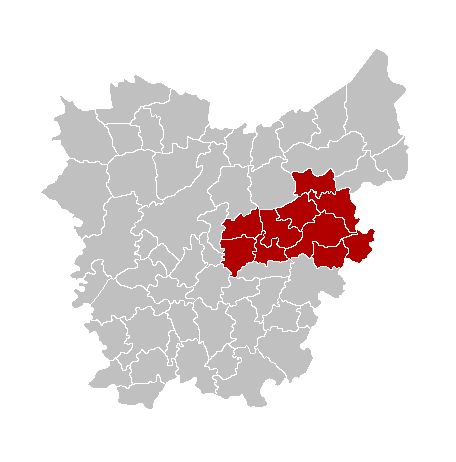
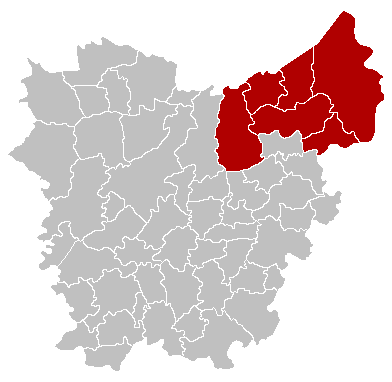

HASC
NUTS
NIS
Population
Area

BE.OV.GT
BE234
44
553,961
944 km²

BE.OV.OD
BE235
45
123,330
419 km²

BE.OV.EK
BE233
43
84,113
334 km²

BE.OV.AL
BE231
41
286,741
469 km²

BE.OV.DM
BE232
42
199,553
343 km²

BE.OV.SN
BE236
46
248,489
475 km²

Municipalities
- Aalter
- Deinze
- Destelbergen
- Evergem
- Gavere
- Ghent
- Lievegem
- Lochristi
- Merelbeke-Melle
- Nazareth-De Pinte
- Oosterzele
- Sint-Martens-
  Latem
- Zulte
- Brakel
- Horebeke
- Kluisbergen
- Kruisem
- Lierde
- Maarkedal
- Oudenaarde
- Ronse
- Wortegem-
  Petegem
- Zwalm
- Assenede
- Eeklo
- Kaprijke
- Maldegem
- Sint-Laureins
- Zelzate
- Aalst
- Denderleeuw
- Erpe-Mere
- Geraardsbergen
- Haaltert
- Herzele
- Lede
- Ninove
- Sint-Lievens-
  Houtem
- Zottegem
- Berlare
- Buggenhout
- Dendermonde
- Hamme
- Laarne
- Lebbeke
- Waasmunster
- Wetteren
- Wichelen
- Zele
- Beveren-Kruibeke-Zwijndrecht
- Lokeren
- Sint-Gillis-
  Waas
- Sint-Niklaas
- Stekene
- Temse

== Demographics ==
The province has a population of almost 1.5 million. It had 734,000 inhabitants in 1830, when it was the most populated province of Belgium, and about a million in 1900. Population growth halted around the 1980s, but has increased again in the 21st century. Population figures in recent years is as follows:

Year	Population
1 January 1990	1,331,608
1 January 1995	1,349,382
1 January 2000	1,361,623
1 January 2005	1,380,072
1 January 2010	1,432,326
1 January 2015	1,477,346
1 January 2017	1,496,187

The capital and biggest city is Ghent, also the second largest city in the Flemish Region. Other smaller cities are Aalst, Sint-Niklaas and Dendermonde in the east of the province. The eastern part of the province, part of the Flemish Diamond, is more densely populated than the western part.

== Economy ==
The Gross domestic product (GDP) of the province was 56.4 billion € in 2018. GDP per capita adjusted for purchasing power was 33,000 € or 109% of the EU27 average in the same year.

== Government ==
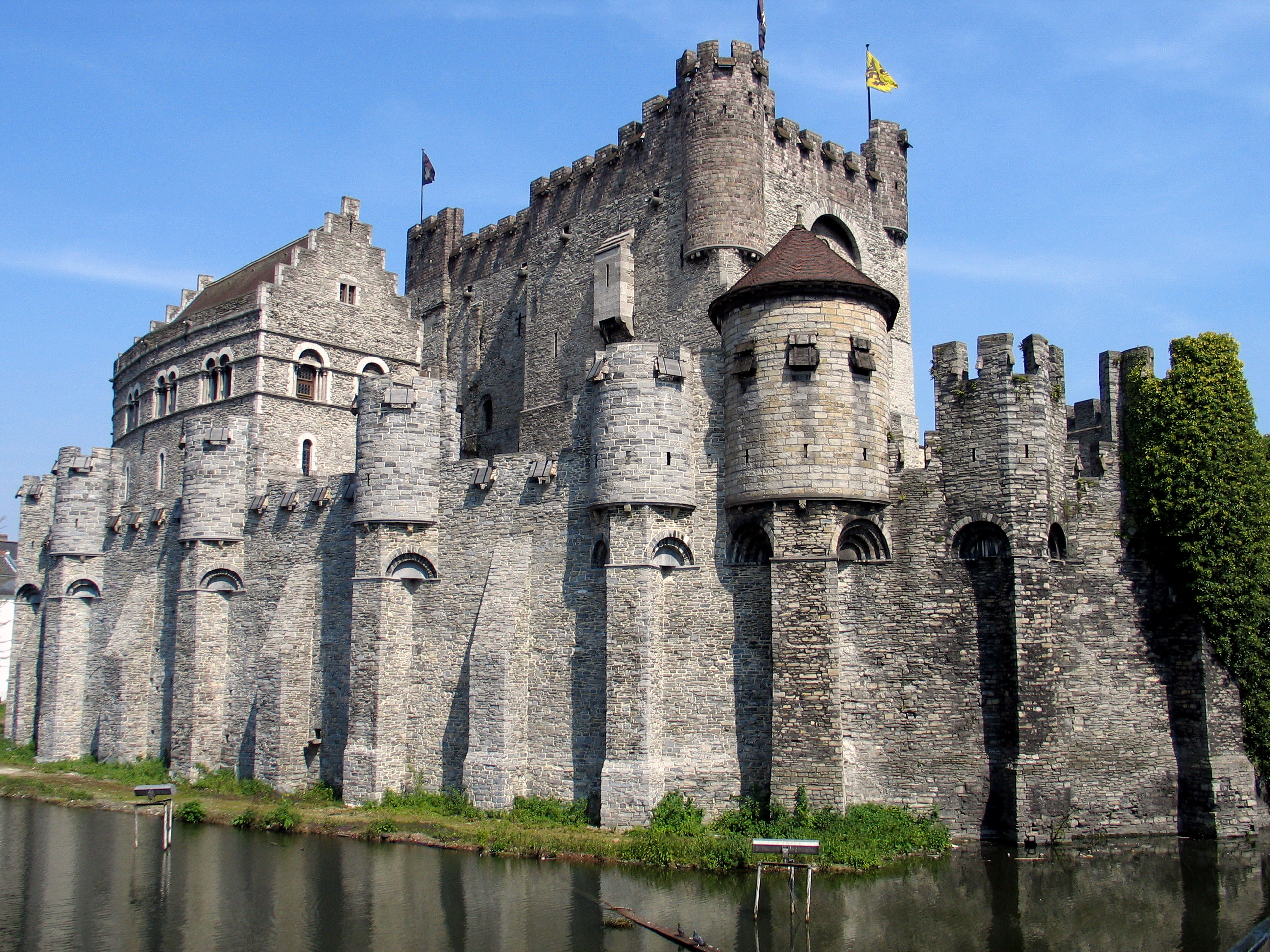
The Gravensteen in Ghent, the provincial capital

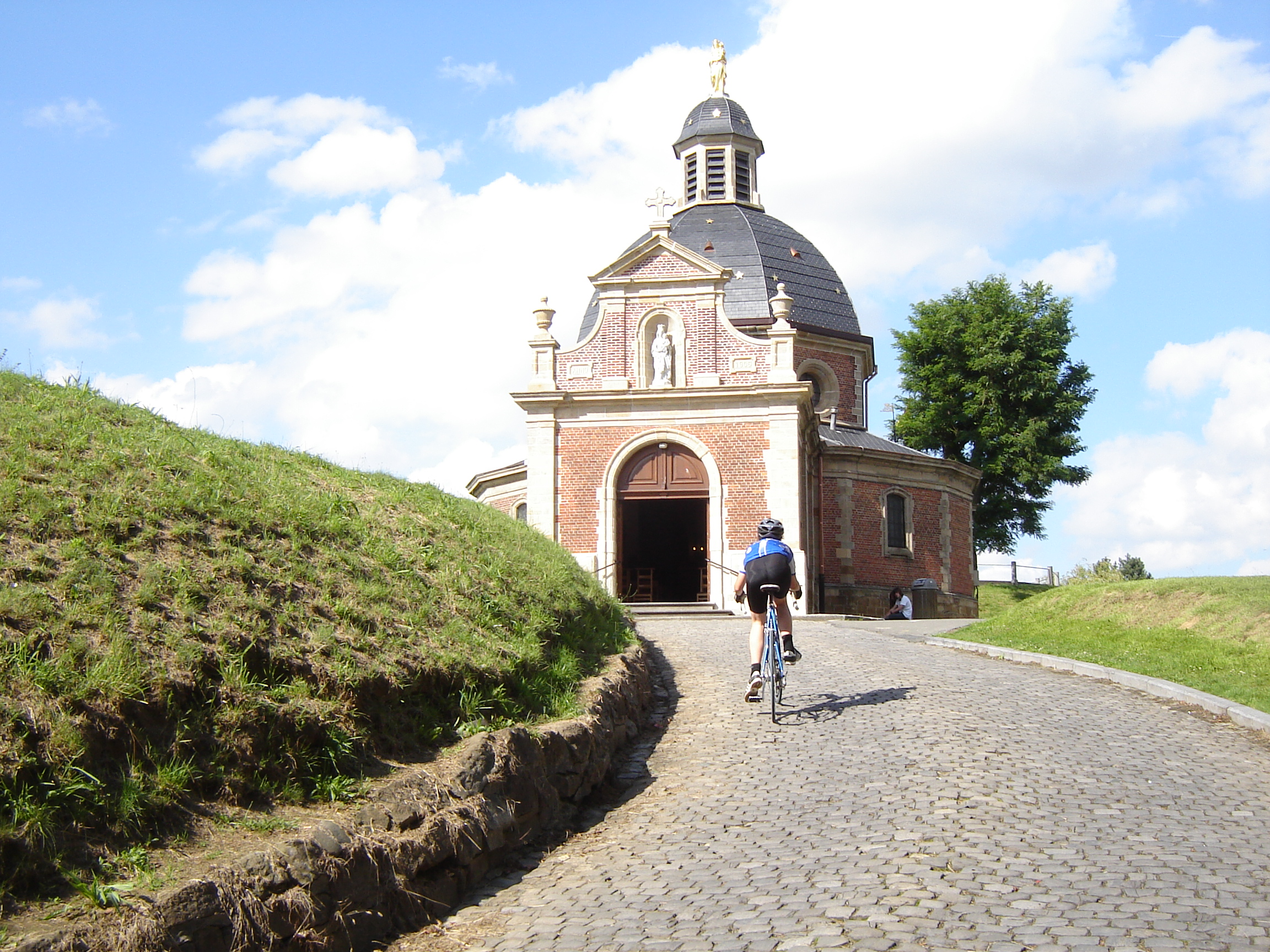
The Muur van Geraardsbergen

The provincial council (provincieraad) consists of 36 members which were last elected in the 2018 elections. Previously it consisted of 72 members. The council currently consists of the following political parties:

- N-VA (Flemish nationalists): 8 members
- CD&V (Christian democrats): 7 members
- Open VLD (liberals): 7 members
- sp.a (social democrats): 3 members
- Vlaams Belang (far-right nationalists): 6 members
- Groen (greens): 5 members

Four people chosen by and from the council form the daily government, called the deputation (deputatie). The deputation of East Flanders is a coalition of the N-VA, CD&V, and Groen.

The daily government is led by the governor, who is appointed by the Flemish Government. Carina Van Cauter (VLD) has been the governor of East Flanders since 1 September 2020.

The province has a yearly budget of approximately 300 million euro.

=== Governors ===
- 1830: Pierre De Ryckere
- 1830–1834: Werner de Lamberts-Cortenbach
- 1834–1836: Charles Vilain XIIII
- 1837–1843: Louis de Schiervel
- 1843–1848: Leander Desmaisières
- 1848–1871: Edouard De Jaegher (lib.)
- 1871–1879: Emile de T'Serclaes De Wommersom
- 1879–1885: Léon Verhaeghe de Naeyer (lib.)
- 1885–1919: Raymond de Kerchove d'Exaerde
- 1919–1921: Maurice Lippens (lib.)
- 1921–1929: André de Kerchove de Denterghem (lib.)
- 1929–1935: Karel Weyler (lib.)
- 1935–1938: Jules Ingenbleek (lib.)
- 1938–1939: Louis Frederiq (lib)
- 1939–1954: Maurice Van den Boogaerde
- 1954–1963: Albert Mariën (lib.)
- 1963–1984: Roger de Kinder (BSP)
- 1984–2004: Herman Balthazar (SP.A)
- 2004-2013: André Denys (VLD)
- 2013-2018: Jan Briers (none; nominated by N-VA)
- 2018–present: Carina Van Cauter (VLD)

Timeline:
