= Steam Train Maldegem-Eeklo =

Coordinates: 51.2050°N 3.4474°E

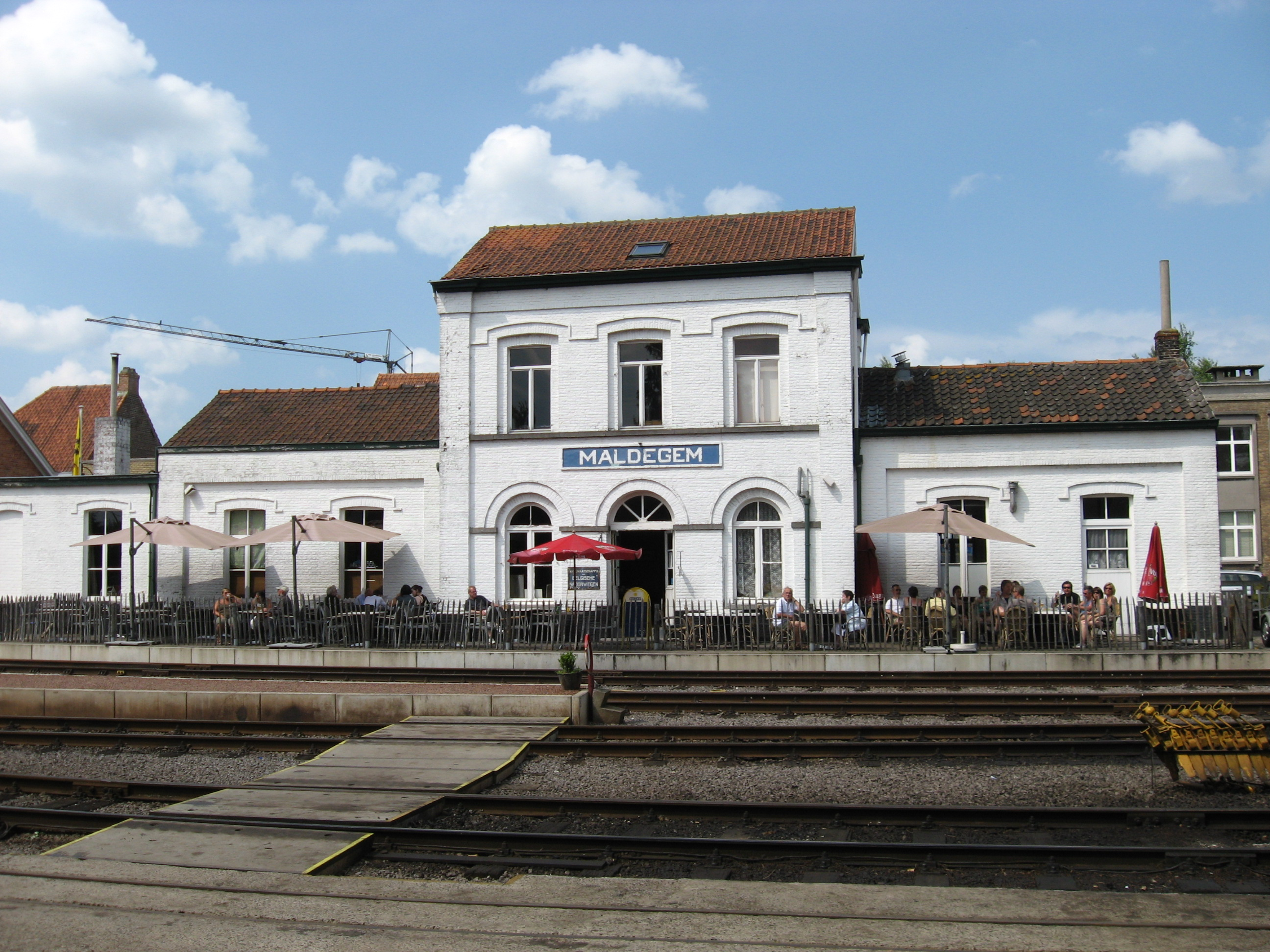
The main station building in Maldegem

Steam Train Maldegem-Eeklo (Dutch: Stoomtrein Maldegem-Eeklo, SME), formerly Steam Centre Maldegem (Dutch: Stoomcentrum Maldegem, SCM), is a heritage railway association based at the former NMBS station of Maldegem in northern Belgium. Standard gauge steam and diesel trains run on the line to Eeklo. A 600 mm (1 ft 11 5/8 in) narrow gauge line runs from Maldegem to Donk on the former line to Bruges; this was supplemented by the standard gauge line in 1989.

== Line 58 ==
Railway line 58 used to run from Ghent to Bruges, but half of it (between Eeklo and Bruges) was closed for passengers in 1959 and for goods in 1962 and 1967. Steam Train Maldegem-Eeklo maintains 10.0 kilometres (6.2 mi) of standard gauge tracks between Maldegem and Eeklo. In Maldegem the organization has acquired the old NMBS station and its buildings. In Balgerhoeke there is a simple station without buildings. In Eeklo, SME has its own simple Eeklo Oostveld station, but the association has also acquired permission to use track 3 of NMBS's Eeklo station, with tracks 1 and 2 still in use for mainline NMBS passenger trains. In Eeklo station SME's preserved line connects to line 58 of the national railway network of Infrabel.

== Stock List ==
=== Steam locomotives ===
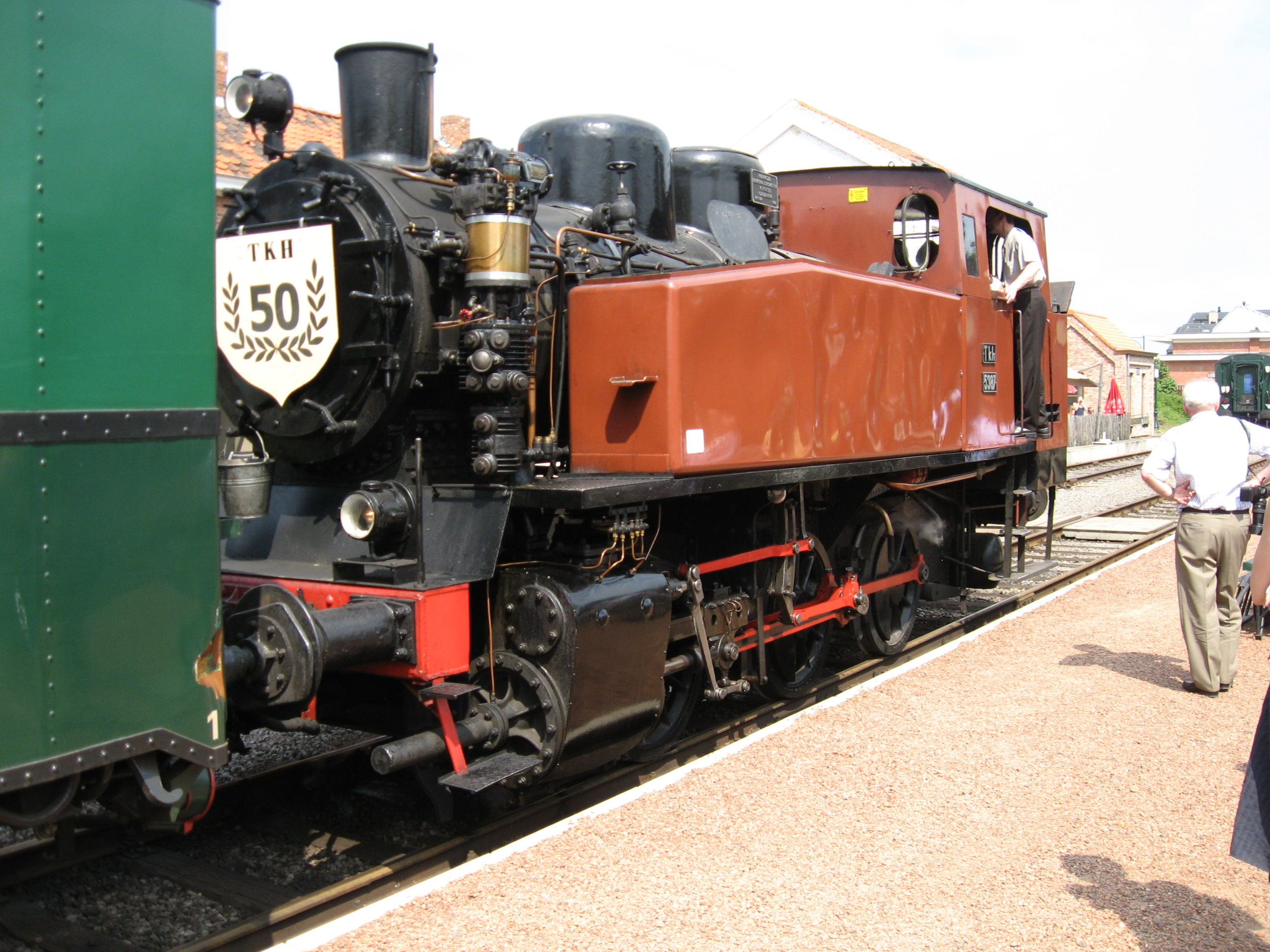
TKh 5387 at Maldegem

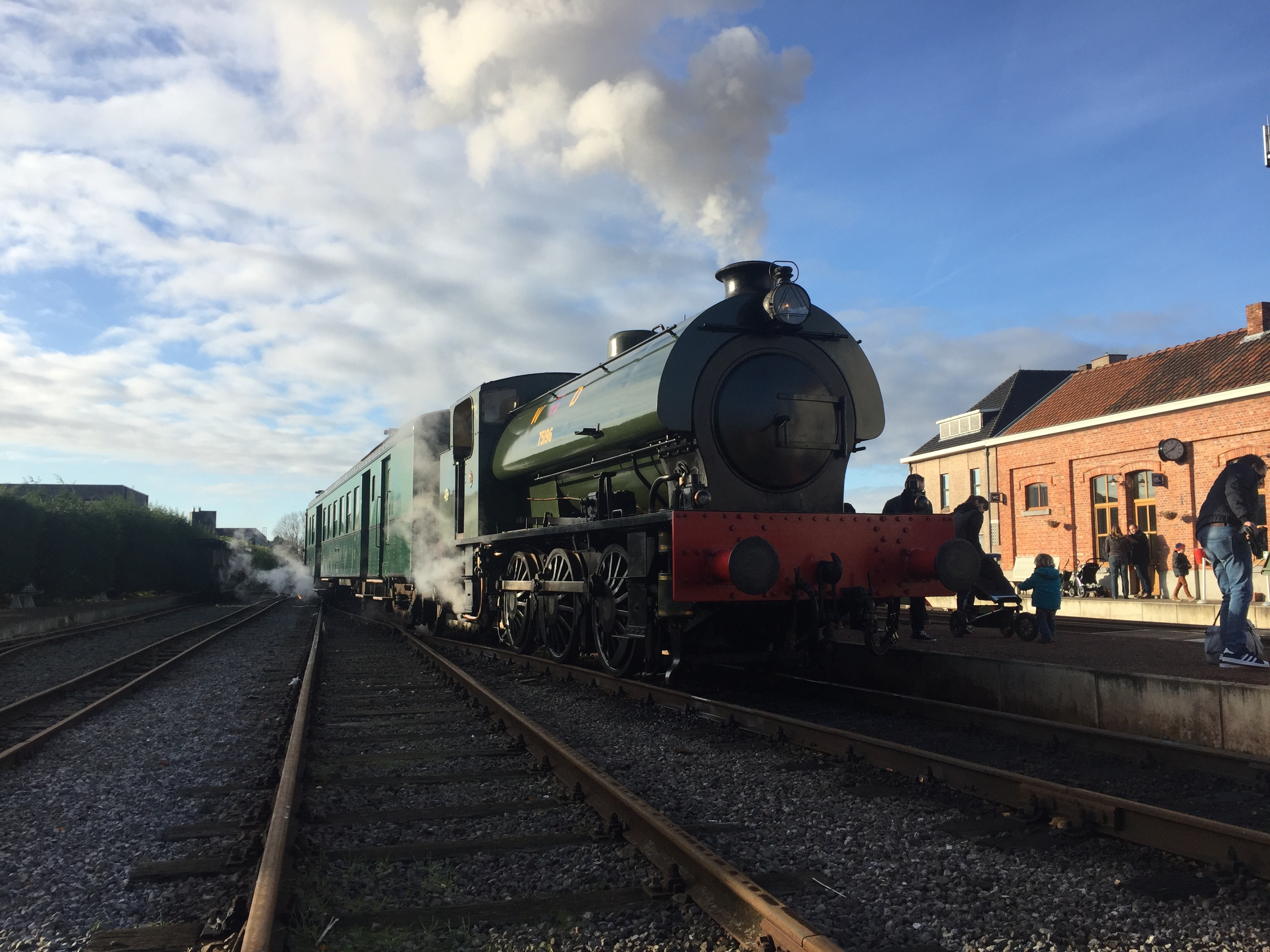
- WD196 after its restoration in 2016
  Operational
  - Standard Gauge
    - Avonside No. 1908 of 1925. Named "Fred".
    - La Meuse of 1926. Named "Bébert".
    - St. Léonard n°947 of 1893. Build in Liège.
    - Hunslet, No. 3796 of 1953, WD196, "Errol Lonsdale". Previously based on the South Devon Railway in England.
    - Hanomag 0-4-0WT of 1906.
- Non Operational
  - Narrow Gauge
    - TKh No. 5387, named "General Maczik". Moved to SME from the Northampton & Lamport Railway in England in 2006.
    - Haine St. Pierre n°416 of 1891. Awaiting restoration
    - Orenstein & Koppel 0-4-0WT of 1911 (works number 4854). Named "Marie", Static. (First Locomotive of SME)
    - "Adolphe" Tubize 4-6-2 (miniature) 1935. Built for Brussels World Fair railway. Awaiting restoration.
  - Standard Gauge
    - Haine Saint-Pierre n°1405 of 1923. Stored awaiting restoration.
    - 41.195 (Ex-SNCB) Macintosh superheated 0-6-0. Awaiting restoration.
    - AD08 "La Meuse" (ex-CFV3V) awaiting restoration.

=== Diesel locomotives ===
- Operational
  - Standard Gauge
    - SNCB Class 74 7408. Operational.
    - SNCB Class 80 8040. Operational.
    - SNCB Class 91 9151. Operational.
  - Narrow Gauge
    - Moës 4wDM.
    - Moës 4wDM, named "NELE".
    - Diema DS30-1
- Non Operational
  - Standard Gauge
    - Moës shunter named "Karien"
  - Narrow Gauge
    - Moës 4wDM, to be named "Dolly", under repair.
    - Simplex 4wDM, Under restoration off site.

=== Diesel multiple units ===
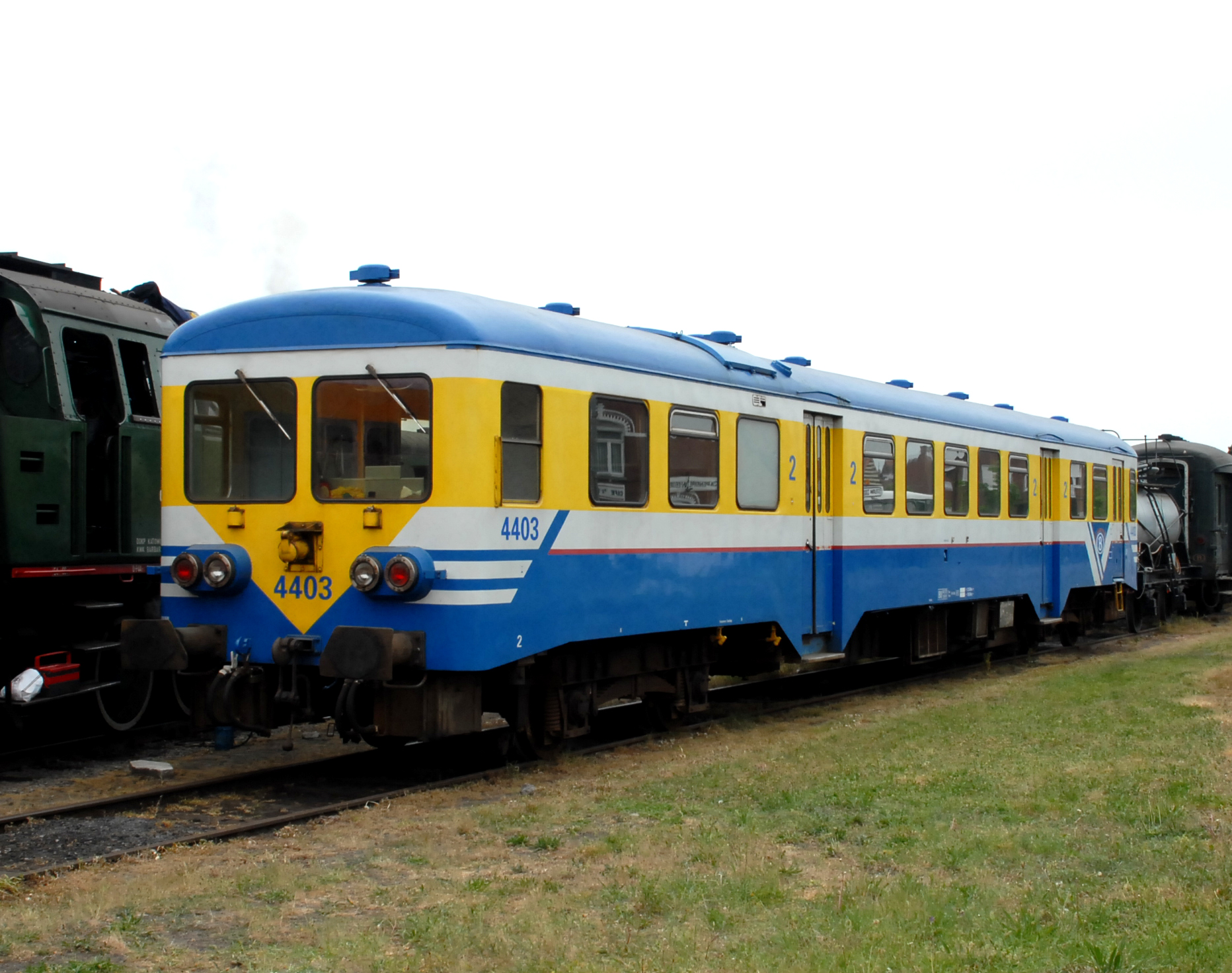
4403 at Maldegem

- Operational
  - Standard Gauge
    - SNCB Class 44 single car unit 4403 Operational.
    - SNCB Class 46 single car unit 4620 Operational.
    - SNCB Class 49 single car unit 4903 Operational.
    - SNCB Inspection unit ES202.
- Non Operational
  - Standard Gauge
    - SNCB Class 44 single car unit 4405 Will be scrapped
