= Evergem =

- Municipality
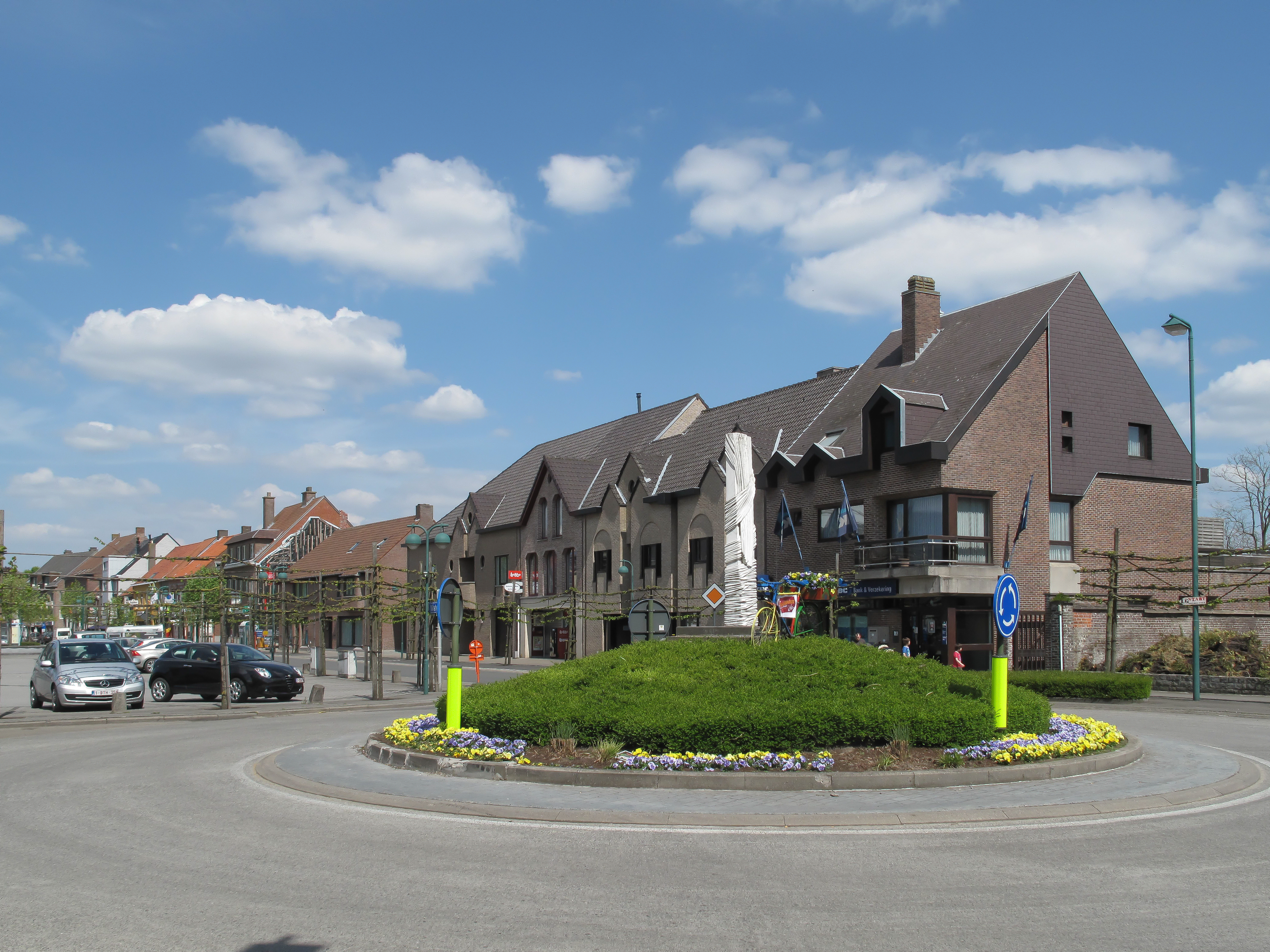
- Sleidinge

- Flag Coat of arms

- Location of Evergem in East Flanders
- Interactive map of Evergem
- Location in Belgium
- Coordinates: 51°07′N 03°42′E
- Country: Belgium
- Community: Flemish Community
- Region: Flemish Region
- Province: East Flanders
- Arrondissement: Ghent

Government
  - Mayor: Joeri De Maertelaere (N-VA)
  - Governing parties: N-VA, CD&V

Area
  - Total: 75.37 km^{2} (29.10 sq mi)

Population (2018-01-01)
  - Total: 35,239
  - Density: 467.5/km^{2} (1,211/sq mi)
- Postal codes: 9940
- NIS code: 44019
- Area codes: 09
- Website: www.evergem.be

Evergem (Dutch pronunciation: [ˈeːvərɣɛm]) is a municipality located in the Belgian province of East Flanders. The municipality comprises the towns of Belzele, Doornzele, Ertvelde, Evergem proper, Kerkbrugge-Langerbrugge, Kluizen, Rieme, Sleidinge and Wippelgem. In 2021, Evergem had a total population of 35,791.

== Demographics ==
Historical population

Year	Pop.	±%
1977	27,846	—
1980	28,714	+3.1%
1985	29,346	+2.2%

Year	Pop.	±%
1990	29,407	+0.2%
1995	29,975	+1.9%
2000	31,155	+3.9%

Year	Pop.	±%
2005	31,963	+2.6%
2006	32,244	+0.9%

Source: Statistics Belgium

== Infrastructure ==
Evergem is served by three bicycle highways: F40 connecting Ghent and Zelzate (under construction as of 2026), F402 connecting Langerbrugge and Oostakker (completed) and F42 connecting Eeklo and Ghent (under construction as of 2026).

Several railway lines cross Evergem, notably line 58 with commuter rail stations Evergem and Sleidinge, as well as freight lines serving the Port of Ghent. De Lijn runs trams to Ghent as well as regional buses.

The ring road R4 also runs through Evergem.

The Port of Ghent and the Ringvaart lie to the east of Evergem.

== Notable people ==
- Angelus de Baets, portrait painter (1793- Ghent, 1855)
- Luc De Vos, singer of the band Gorki (1962-2014)
- Wilfried Martens, former Belgian prime minister, former chairman of the European People's Party (1963 - 2013)
- Eddy Wally, singer (1932-2016)
- Jun Song, Big Brother season 4 winner (1975-present)

== International relations ==
=== Twin towns — Sister cities ===
Evergem is twinned with:

- Stalowa Wola, Poland

== Gallery ==
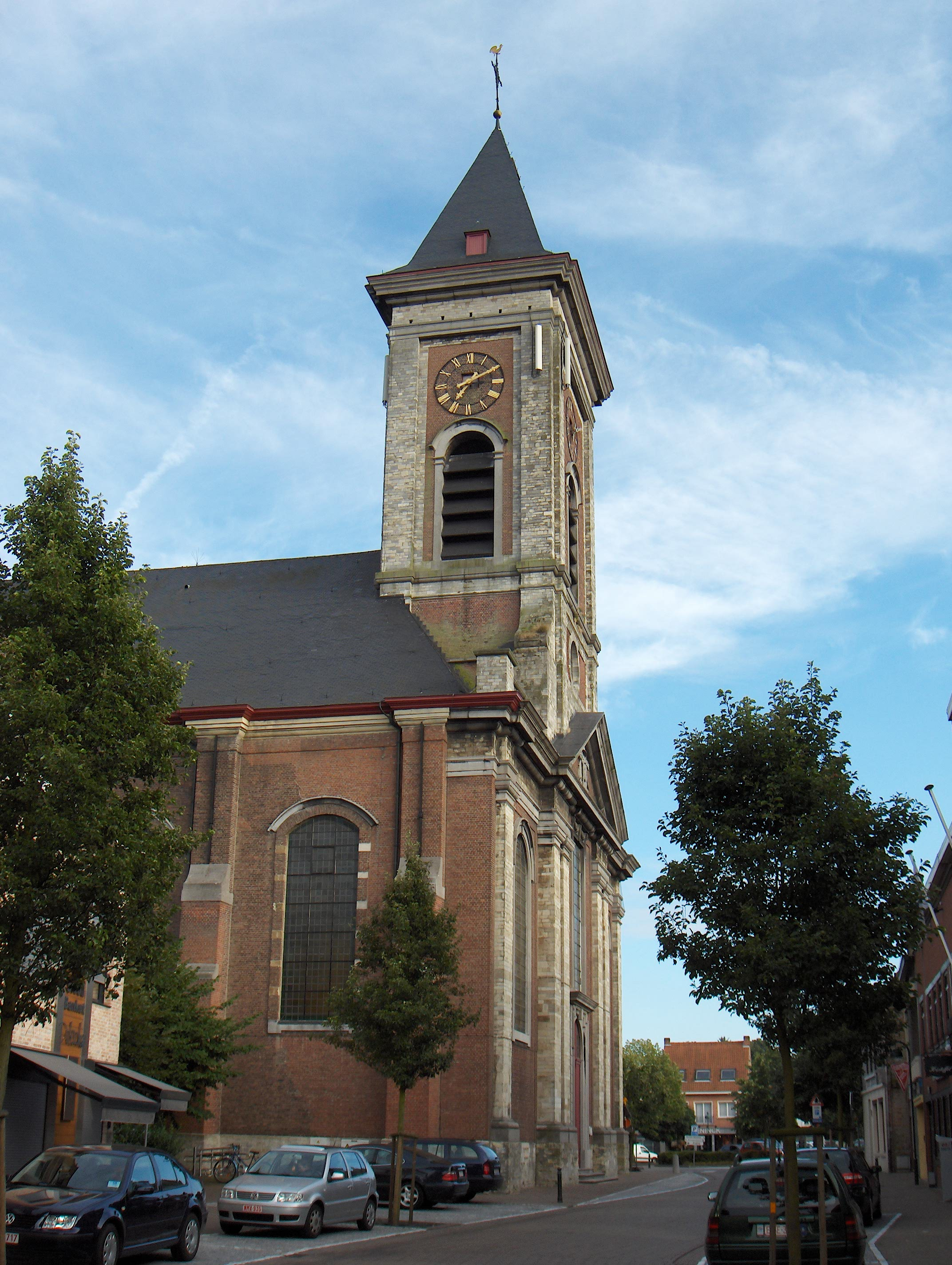
Evergem, church: de Sint Kristoffelkerk

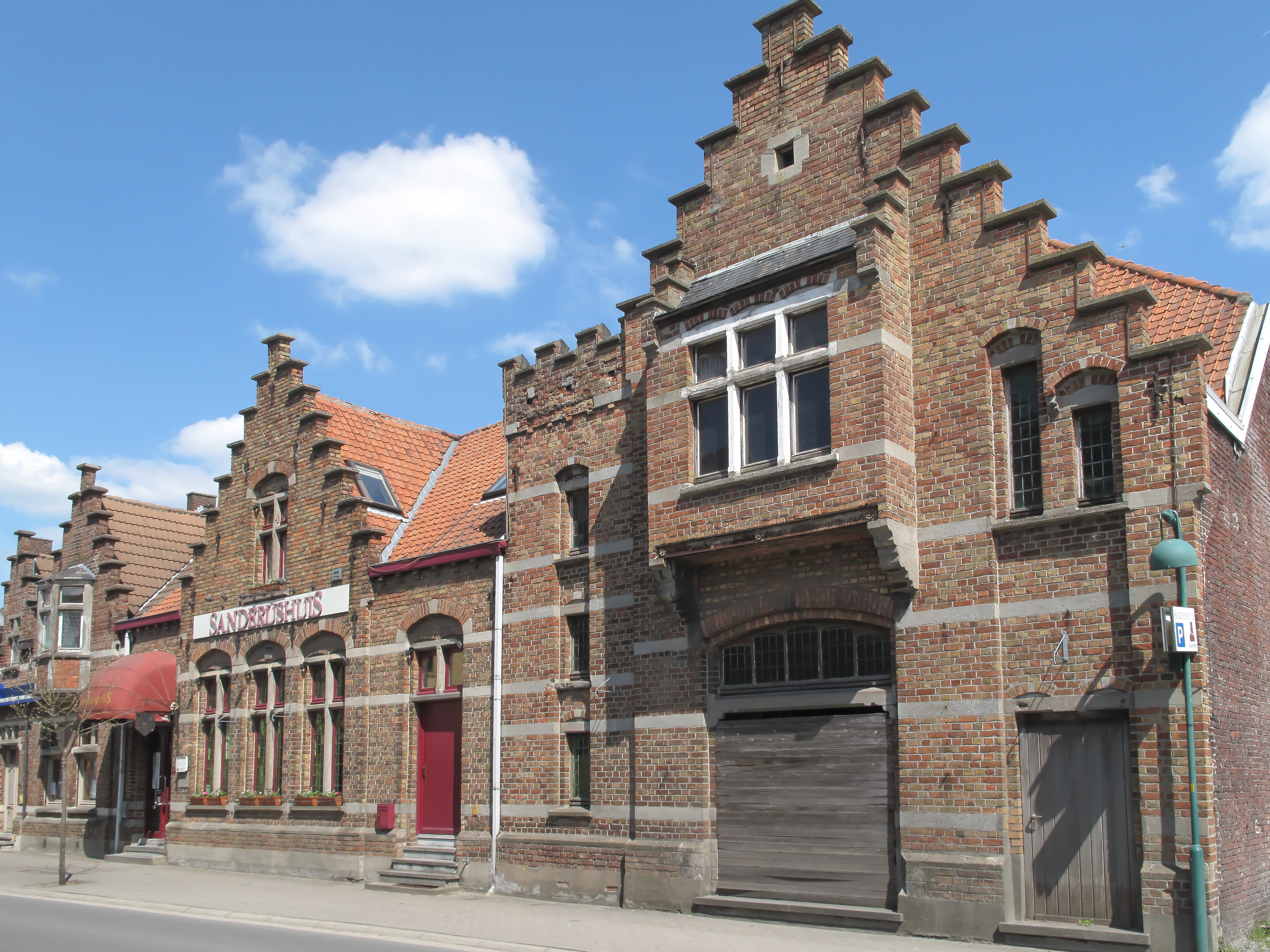
Sleidinge, Dorp 4 tm 6

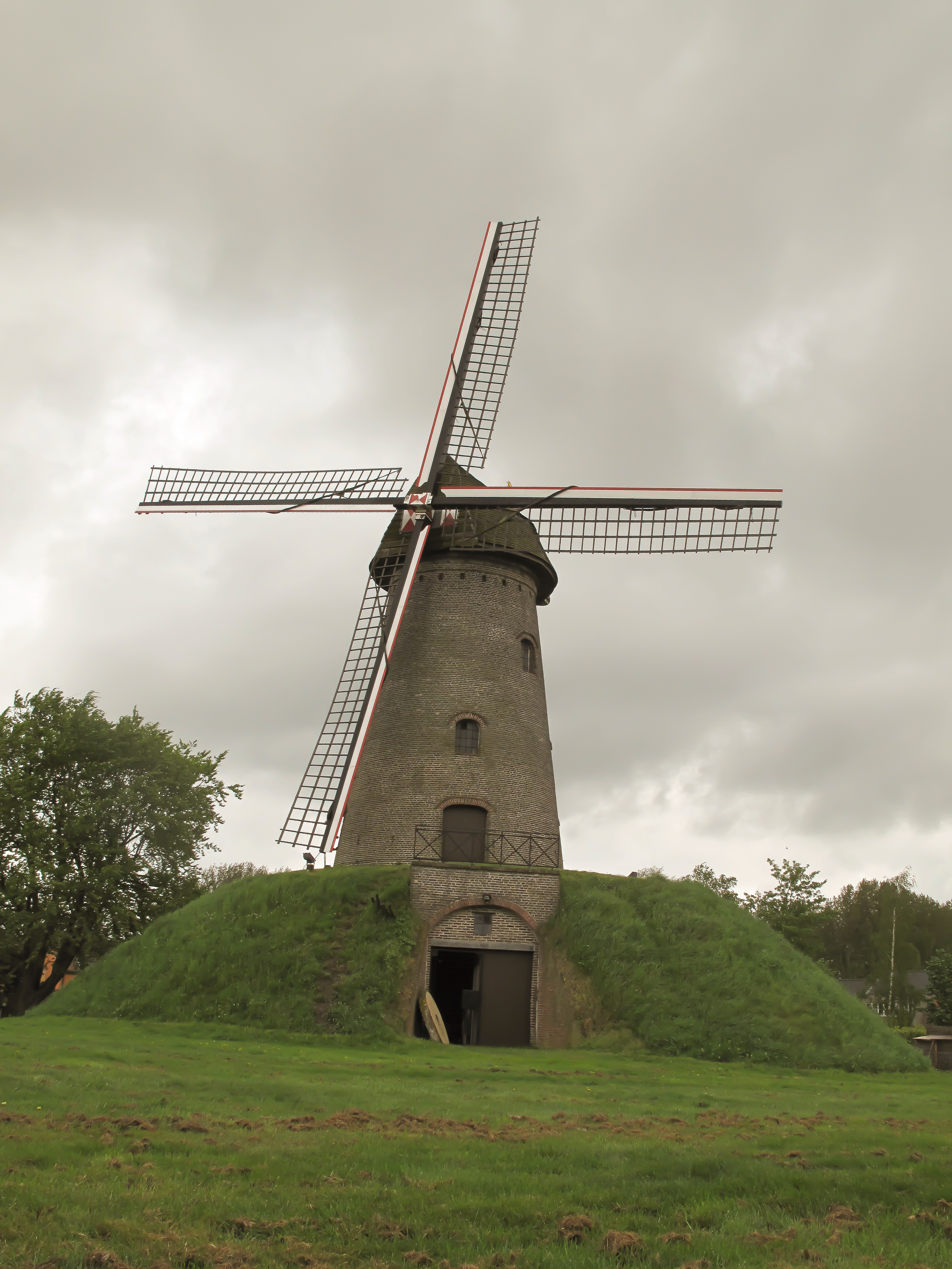
Wippelgem, windmill: de Gerardsmolen

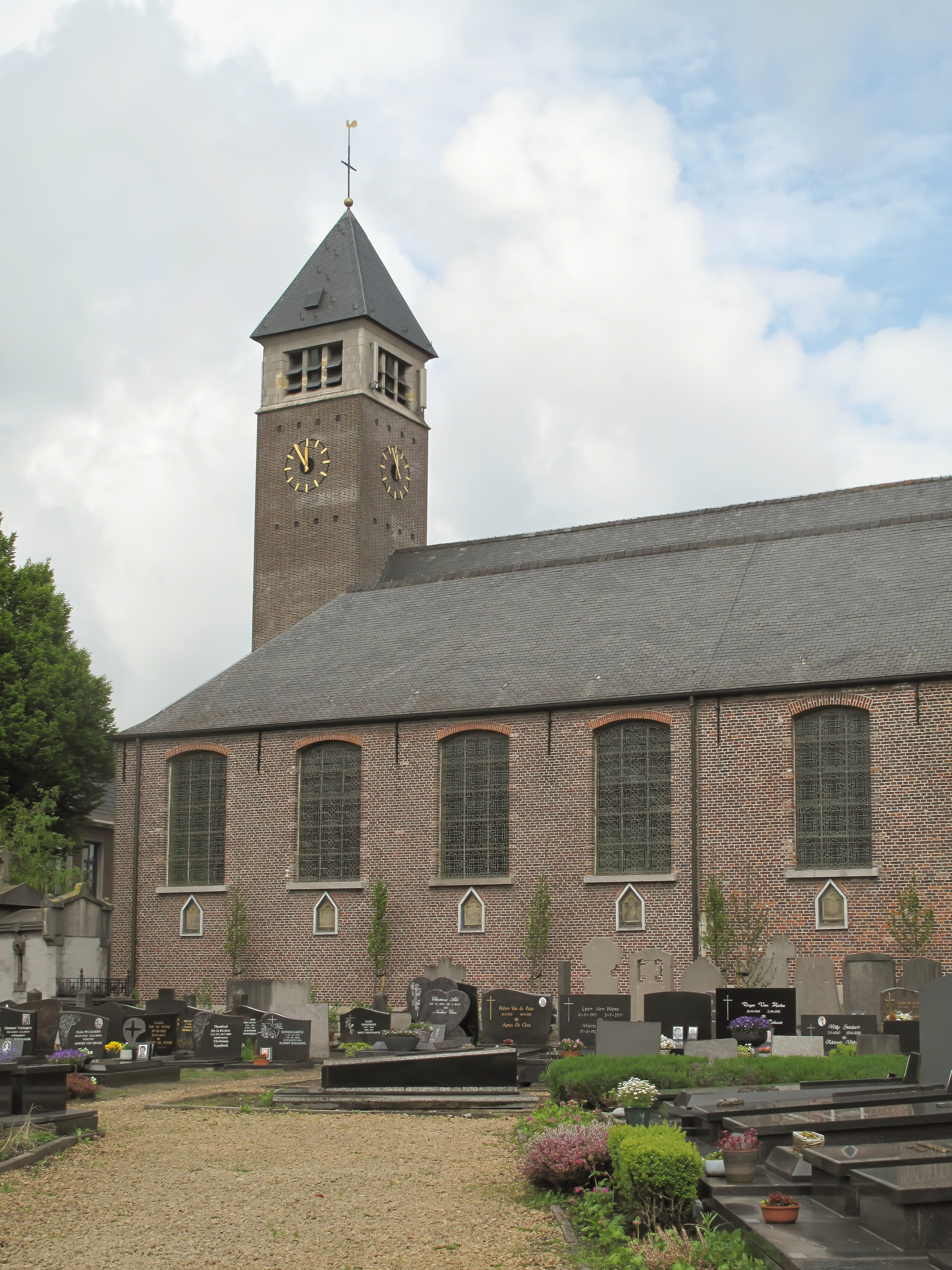
Kluizen, church: de Onze Lieve Vrouw Geboortekerk

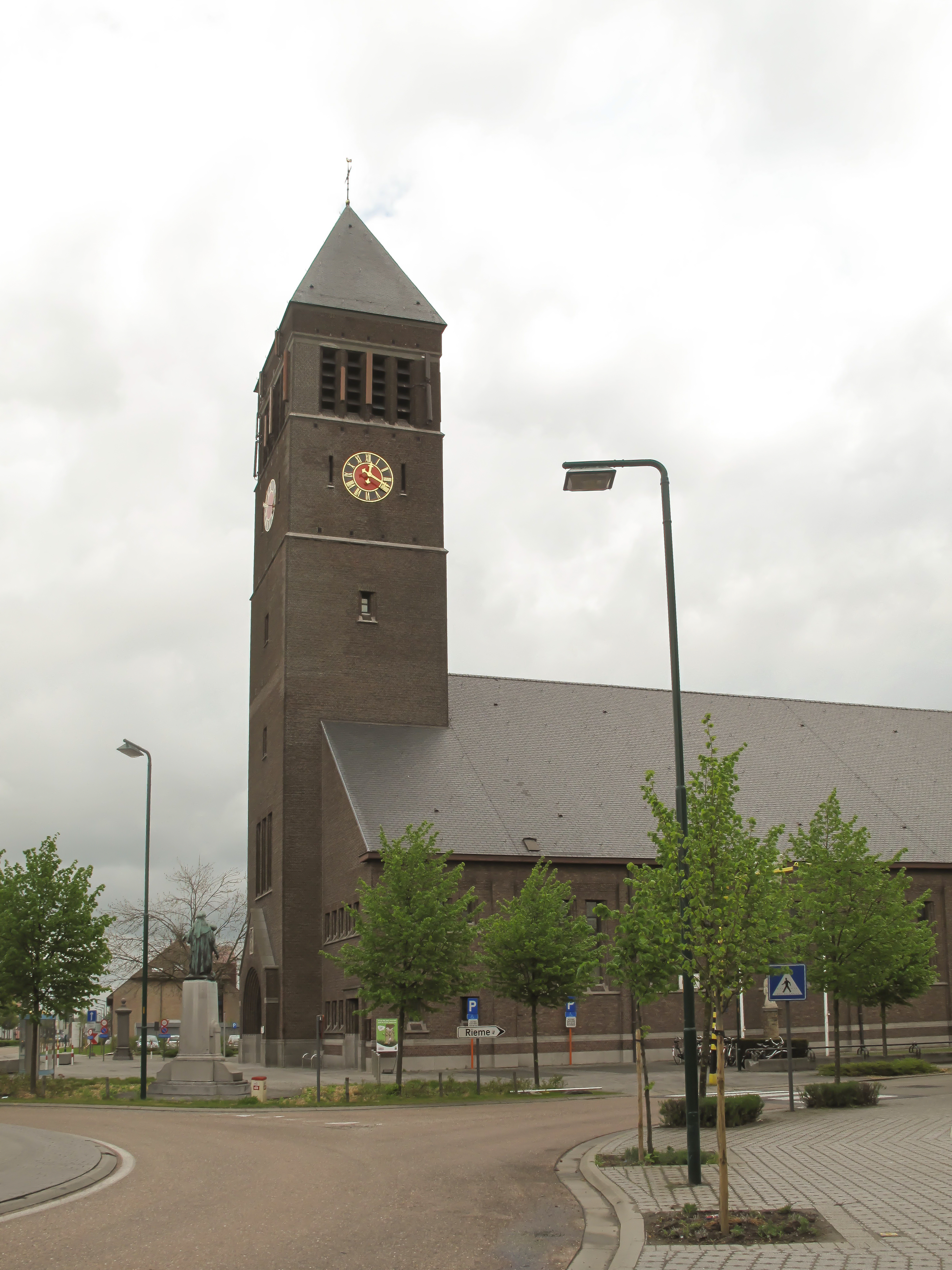
Ertvelde, church: parochiekerk Onze Lieve Vrouwe Hemelvaart

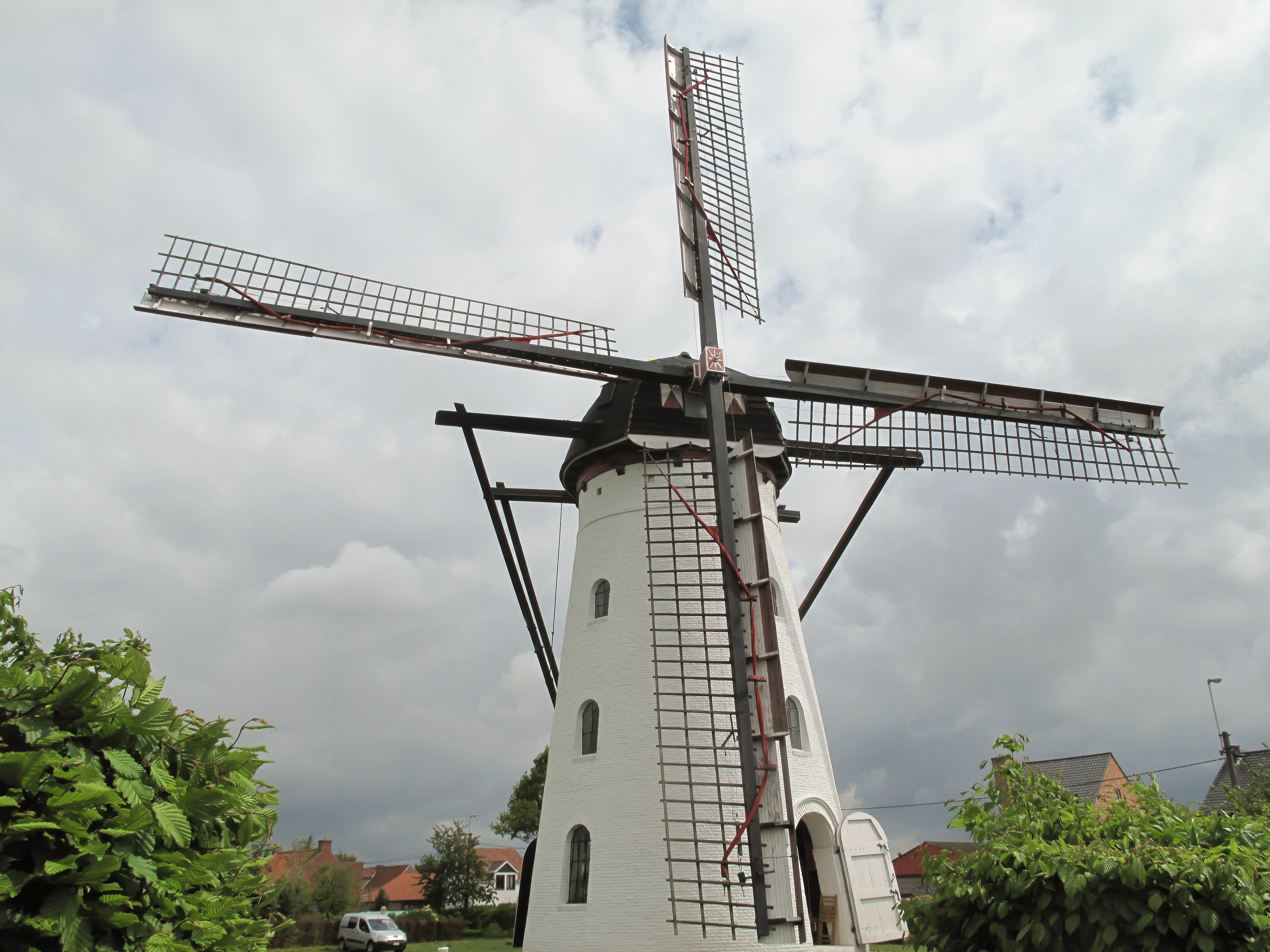
Ertvelde, windmill: de Stenenmolen
