= Evergem railway station =

Railway station in East Flanders, Belgium

Evergem
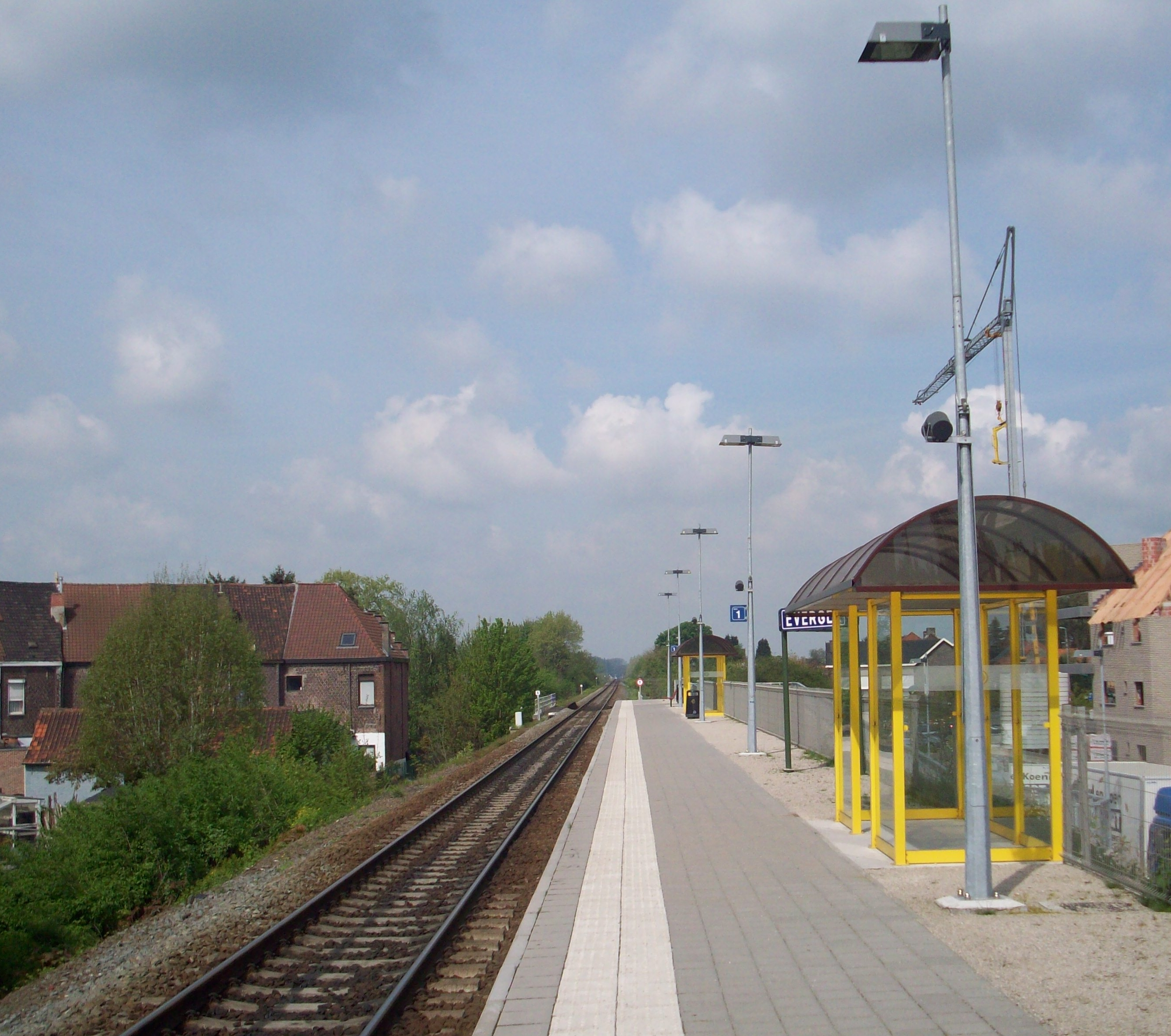

General information
- Location: Stationsplein, Evergem
- Coordinates: 51°6′25.96″N 3°42′8.09″E
- System: Railway Station
- Owner: National Railway Company of Belgium
- Line: 58
- Platforms: 1
- Tracks: 1

Construction
- Cycle facilities: 1

Other information
- Station code: FMV

History
- Opened: 25 June 1861
- Closed: 1959
- Rebuilt: 10 June 2007

Passengers
- 2009: 46592
Location

Evergem is a minor train station in Evergem, East Flanders, Belgium on the Line 58. The train services are operated by NMBS/SNCB.

== History ==
The first railway station in Evergem closed in 1958 to allow for the digging of the Ringvaart. A new station opened on 10 June 2007.

== Gallery ==
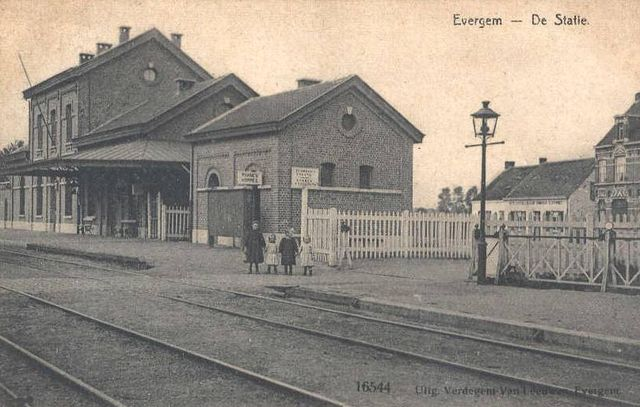
Old station building of Evergem

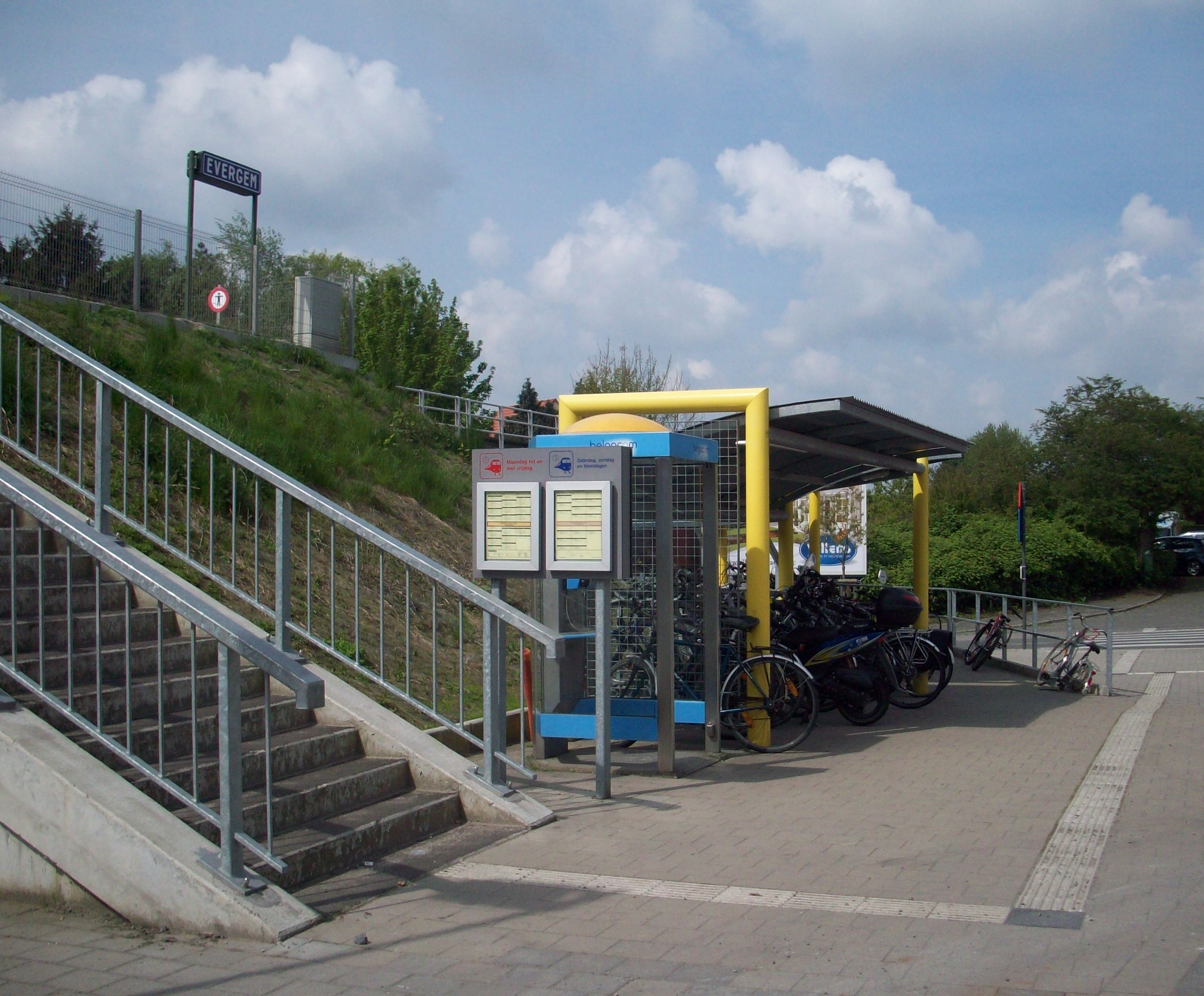
Bicycle parking in 2009

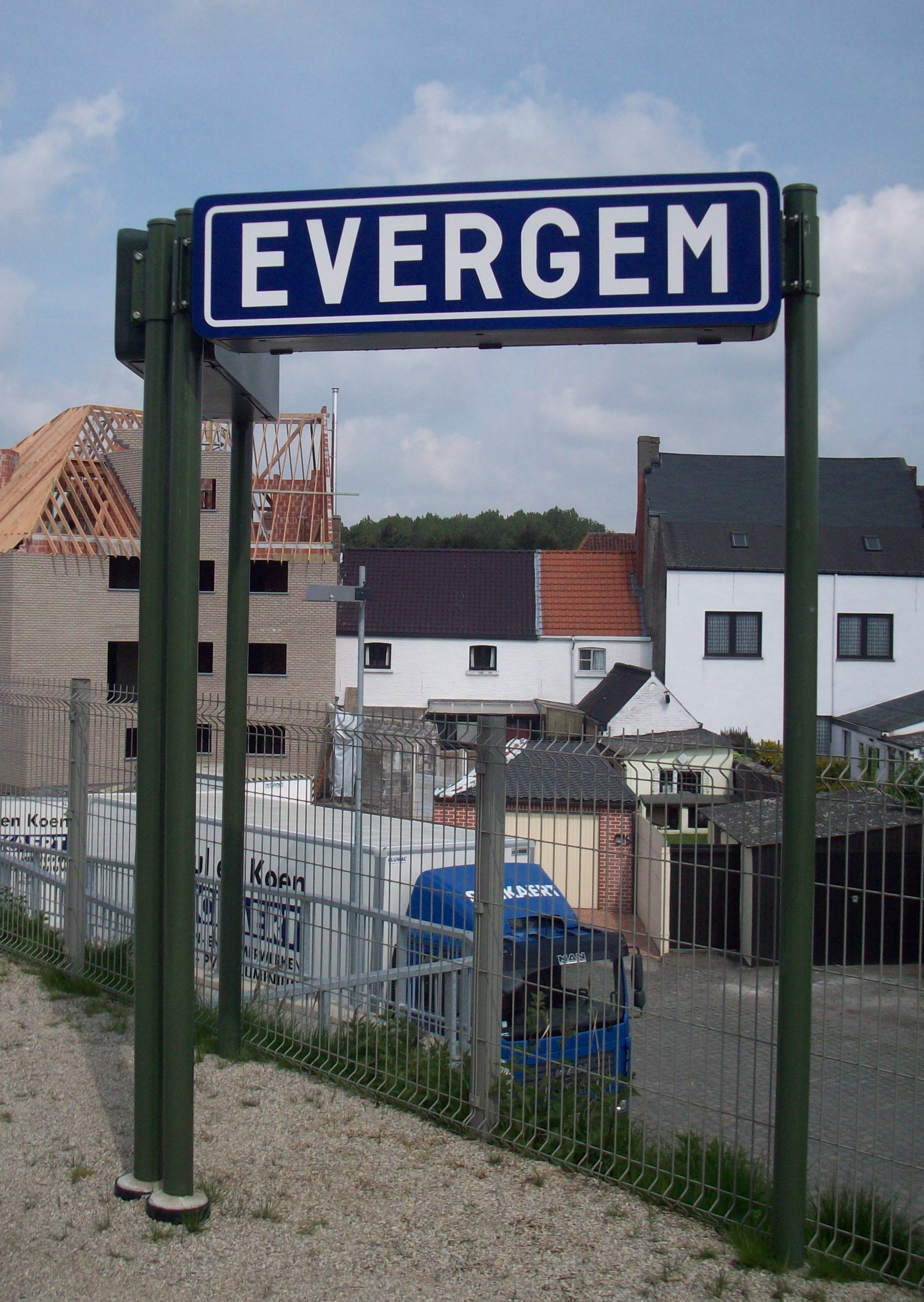
Name sign of Evergem railway station

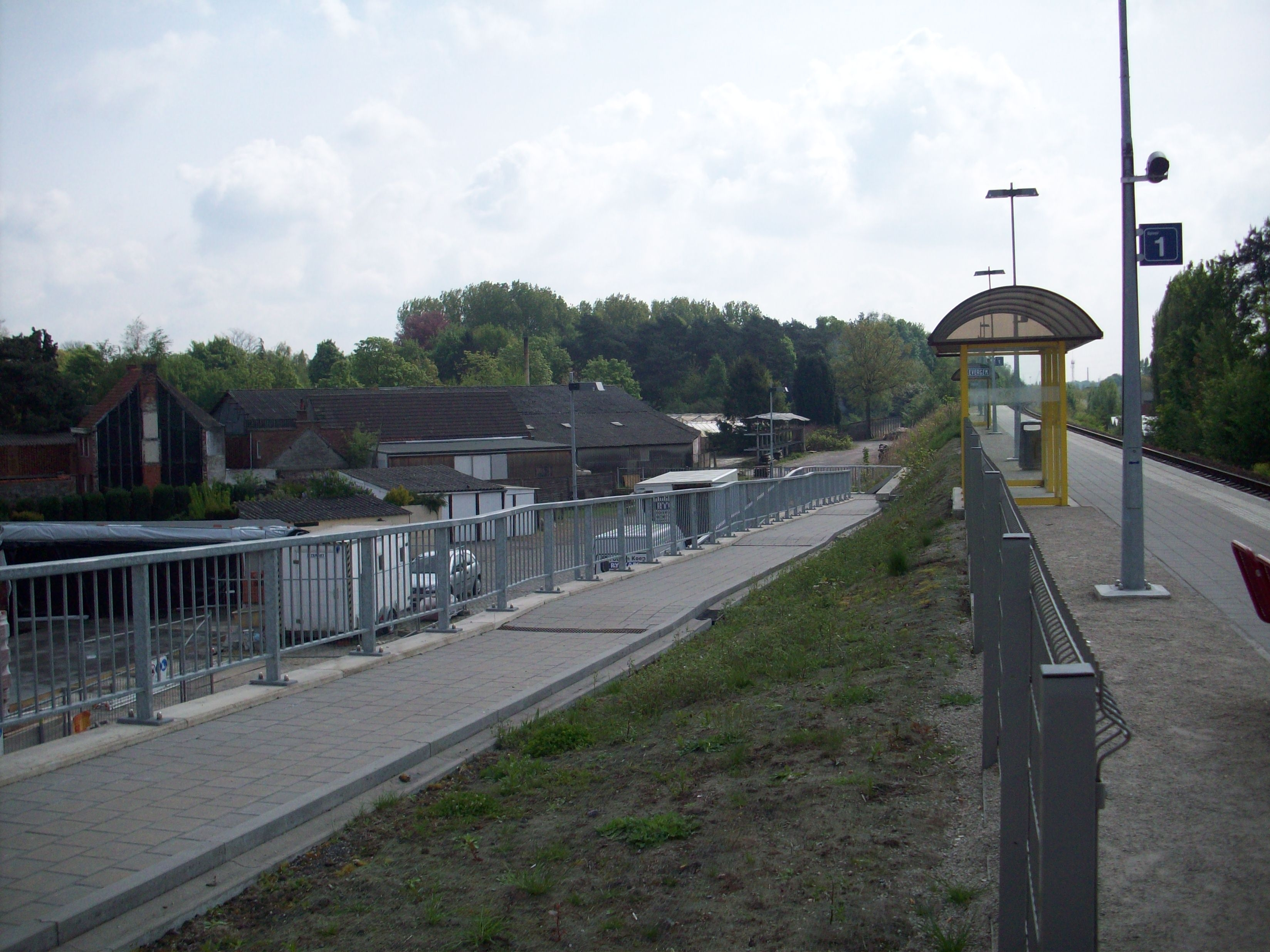
Step-free access to the platform

== Train services ==
The station is served by the following service:

Preceding station	NMBS/SNCB	Following station
Sleidinge towards Eeklo	S 51	Wondelgem towards Ronse
