= Jan Roegiers =

Professor, archivist, and curator

- Born: 19 October 1944; Sleidinge, East Flanders, Belgium
- Died: 12 July 2013 (aged 68); Leuven, Brabant, Belgium
- Known for: Head of Leuven University Library; historian of the old University of Leuven
- Scientific career
- Institutions: Katholieke Universiteit Leuven
- Thesis: De Leuvense theologen en de verlichting: onderwijs, wetenschap, polemiek en politiek van 1730 tot 1797 (1979)
- Doctoral advisor: J. A. van Houtte

Jan Roegiers (1944–2013) was a professor at the Katholieke Universiteit Leuven, and also university archivist, librarian and curator. He specialised in early modern academic history, and in particular the history of the pre-1797 University of Leuven. During his lifetime he was "generally regarded as one of the most authoritative voices in the world of academic history, archive and library science and the heritage sector in Belgium." He is also credited with giving the newly established Flemish university (an independent institution only from 1968) a sense of historical continuity with Leuven's past.

== Early life ==
Jan Roegiers was born in Sleidinge, East Flanders, on 19 October 1944. He attended the Sint-Vincentiuscollege in Eeklo and from there entered the diocesan seminary in Ghent. After a short time in the seminary he enrolled at the Katholieke Universiteit Leuven, where he completed degrees in History and in library and archive science.

== Academic career ==
Roegiers obtained his doctorate in 1979 with a dissertation on Leuven theologians and the Enlightenment.

He became a senior lecturer in the faculty of Arts and the faculty of Theology, chief archivist of the university (1975–2009), head of Leuven University Library (1981–1996), and curator of the university's art collection (1983–2009).

He was director of the Revue d'histoire ecclésiastique (1990-2009), chair of the editorial board of LIAS: Journal of Early Modern Intellectual Culture and its Sources (1993-2009), and chair of the editorial board of Trajecta (1998-2009). He was a moving influence on the early stages of the Short Title Catalogue Flanders (STCV).

Roegiers gave his valedictory lecture, on academic heritage and university history, on 19 February 2010. On the same occasion he was presented with a Festschrift celebrating his career, The Quintessence of Lives: Intellectual Biographies in the Low Countries presented to Jan Roegiers, edited by P. Delsaerdt, H. Schwall, D. Vanysacker, and J.-P. Delville (Brepols, 2010). His retirement was marked with a special exhibition in Leuven University's Central Library, Anima Academiae Bibliotheca, from 10 June to 25 August 2010.

Roegiers died on 12 July 2013 and was buried on 19 July in the Sint-Jan-de-Doperkerk in Leuven. The reading room of the university archive was named "Jan Roegiers reading room" in his memory. His rich library went to KU Leuven Libraries after his death.
