= Sleidinge railway station =

Railway station in East Flanders, Belgium

Sleidinge
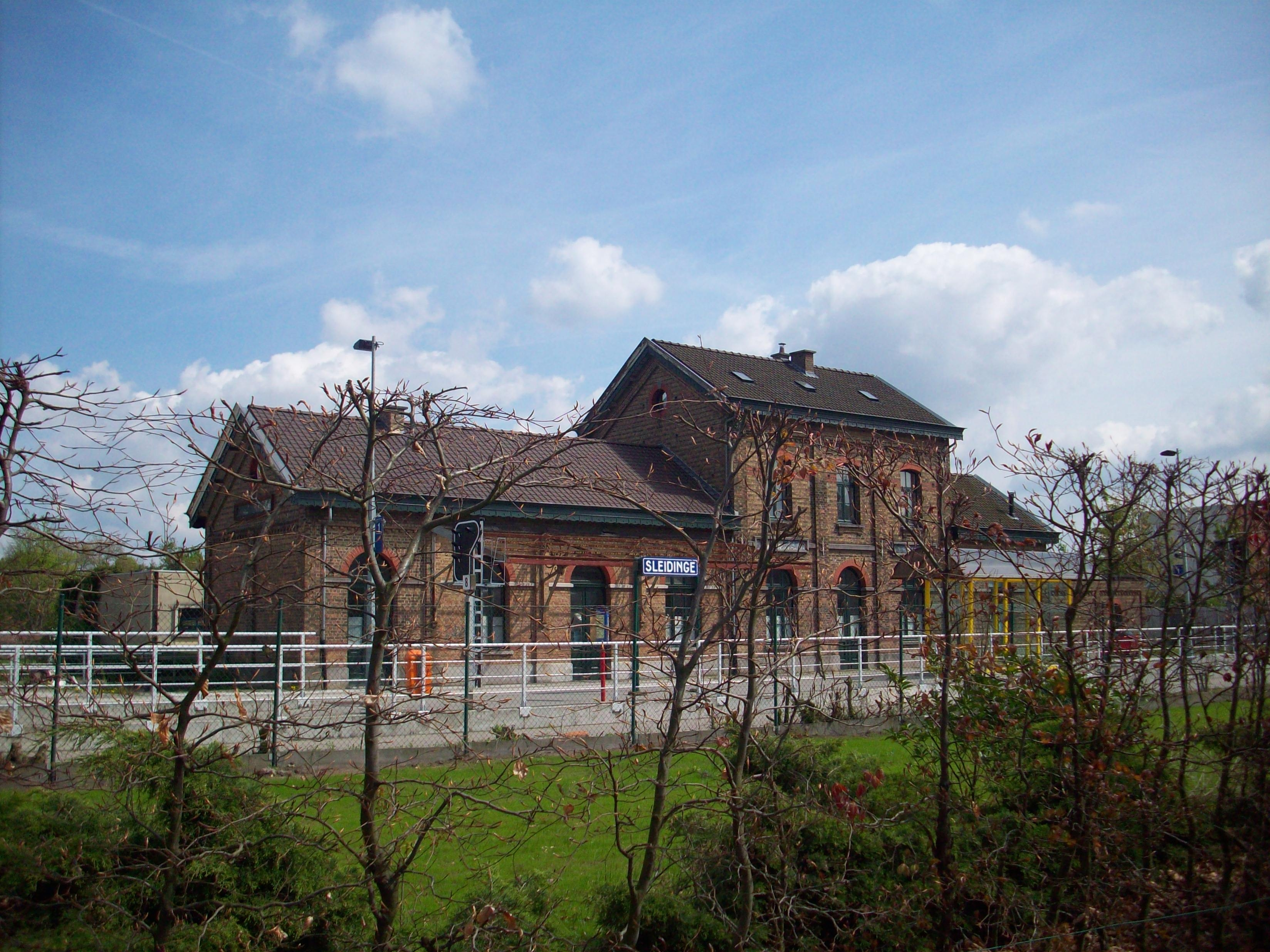

General information
- Location: Weststraat, Sleidinge
- Coordinates: 51°7′33.76″N 3°40′4.4″E
- System: Railway Station
- Owner: National Railway Company of Belgium
- Line: 58
- Platforms: 2
- Tracks: 1

Other information
- Station code: LSD

History
- Opened: 25 June 1861
- Closed: 3 June 1984
- Rebuilt: 29 May 1988

Passengers
- 2009: 69576

Services
Preceding station	NMBS/SNCB	Following station
Waarschoot towards Eeklo	L 05 weekdays	Evergem towards Ronse or Kortrijk
Waarschoot towards Eeklo	L 05 weekends	Evergem towards Ronse
Location

Sleidinge is a railway station in Sleidinge, East Flanders, Belgium. The station opened in 1861 on the Ghent–Eeklo line. The train services are operated by NMBS/SNCB.

The original station building has been a protected monument since 1999.

== Train services ==
The station is served by the following service(s):

- Local services (L-05) Eeklo - Ghent - Oudenaarde - Ronse
- Local services (L-05) Eeklo - Ghent - Oudenaarde - Kortrijk (weekdays)
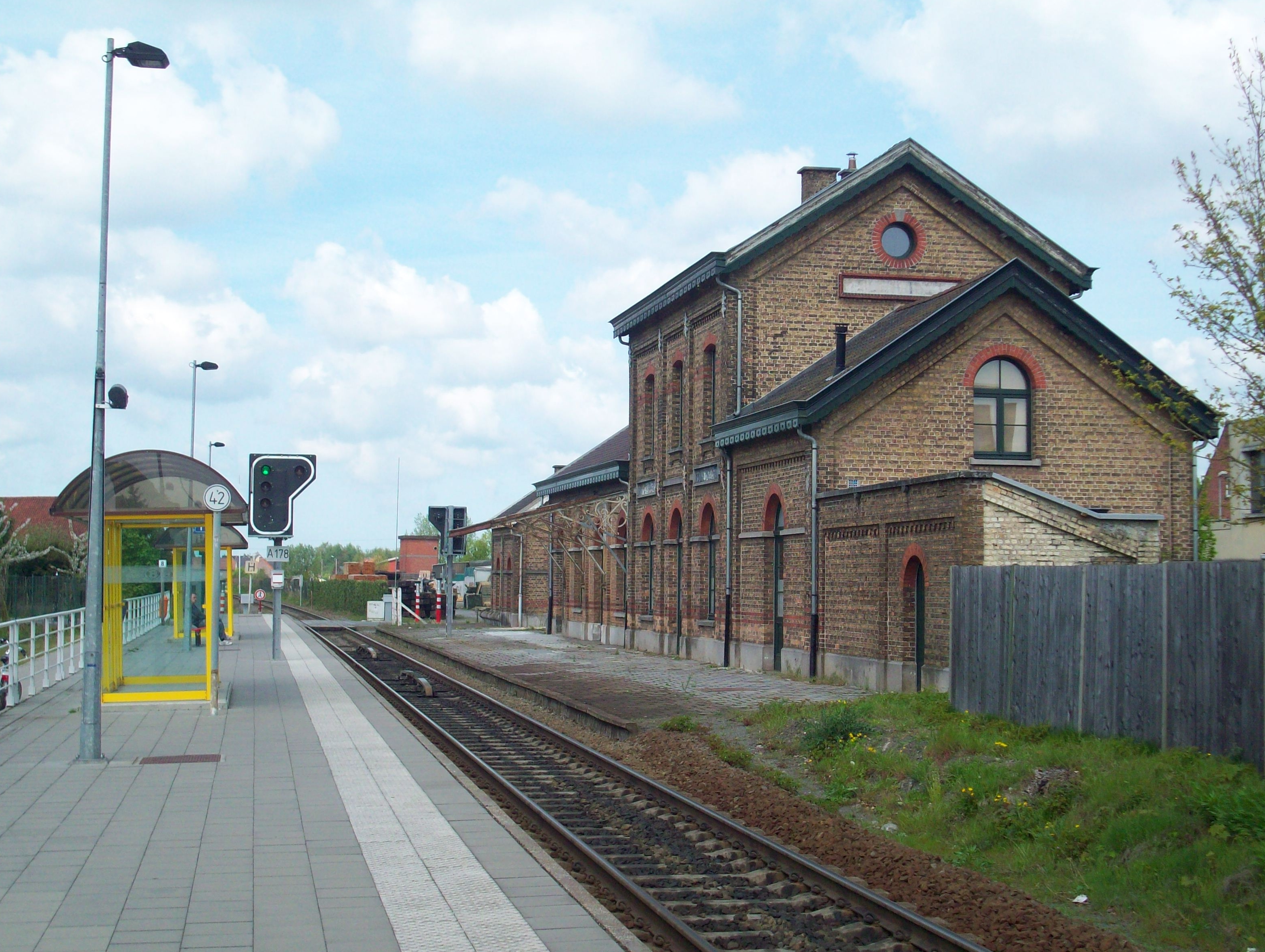
New platform is on the left and the old platform is on the right

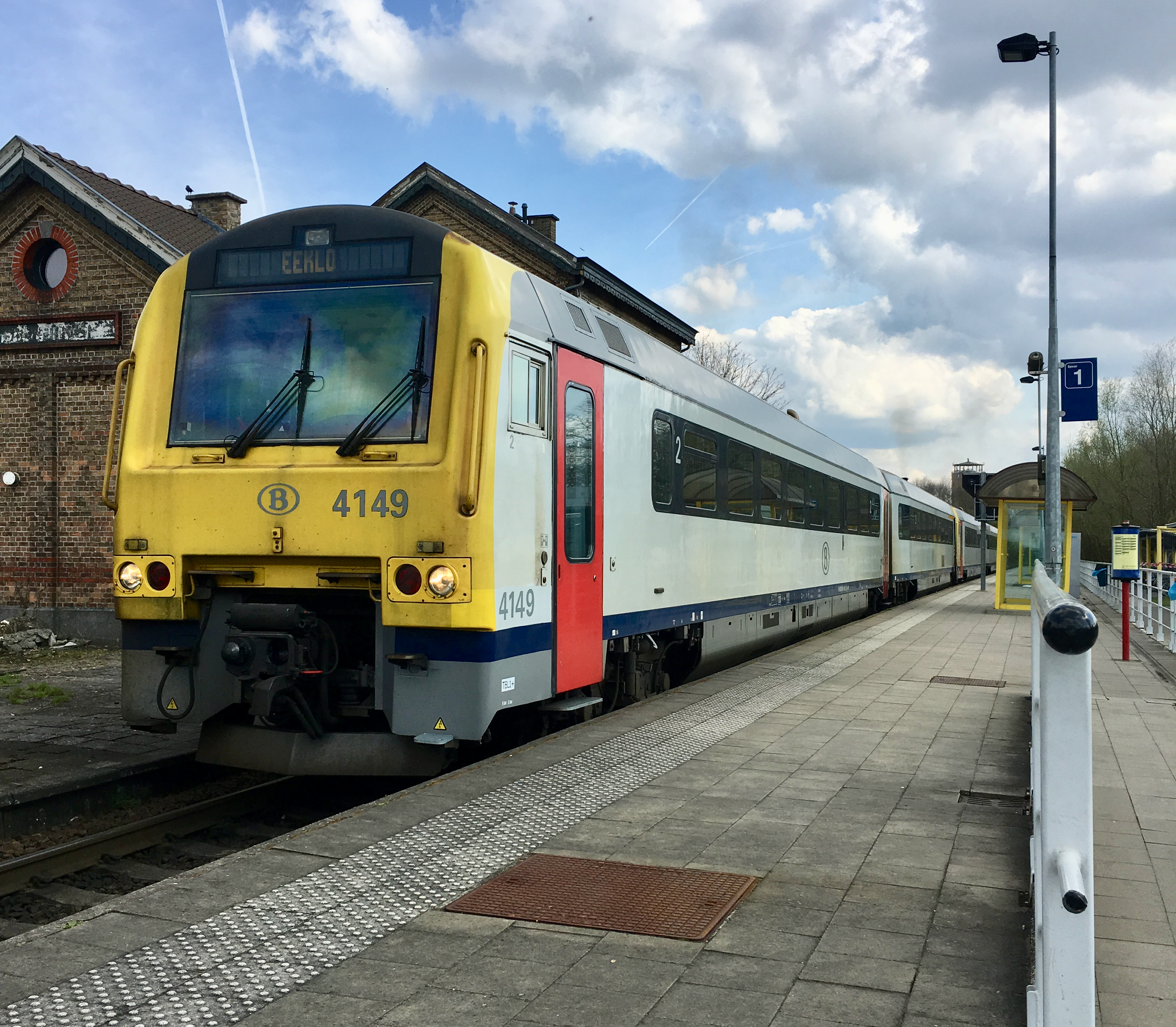
Train to Eeklo in Sleidinge railway station
