= Waarschoot railway station =

Railway station in East Flanders, Belgium

Waarschoot
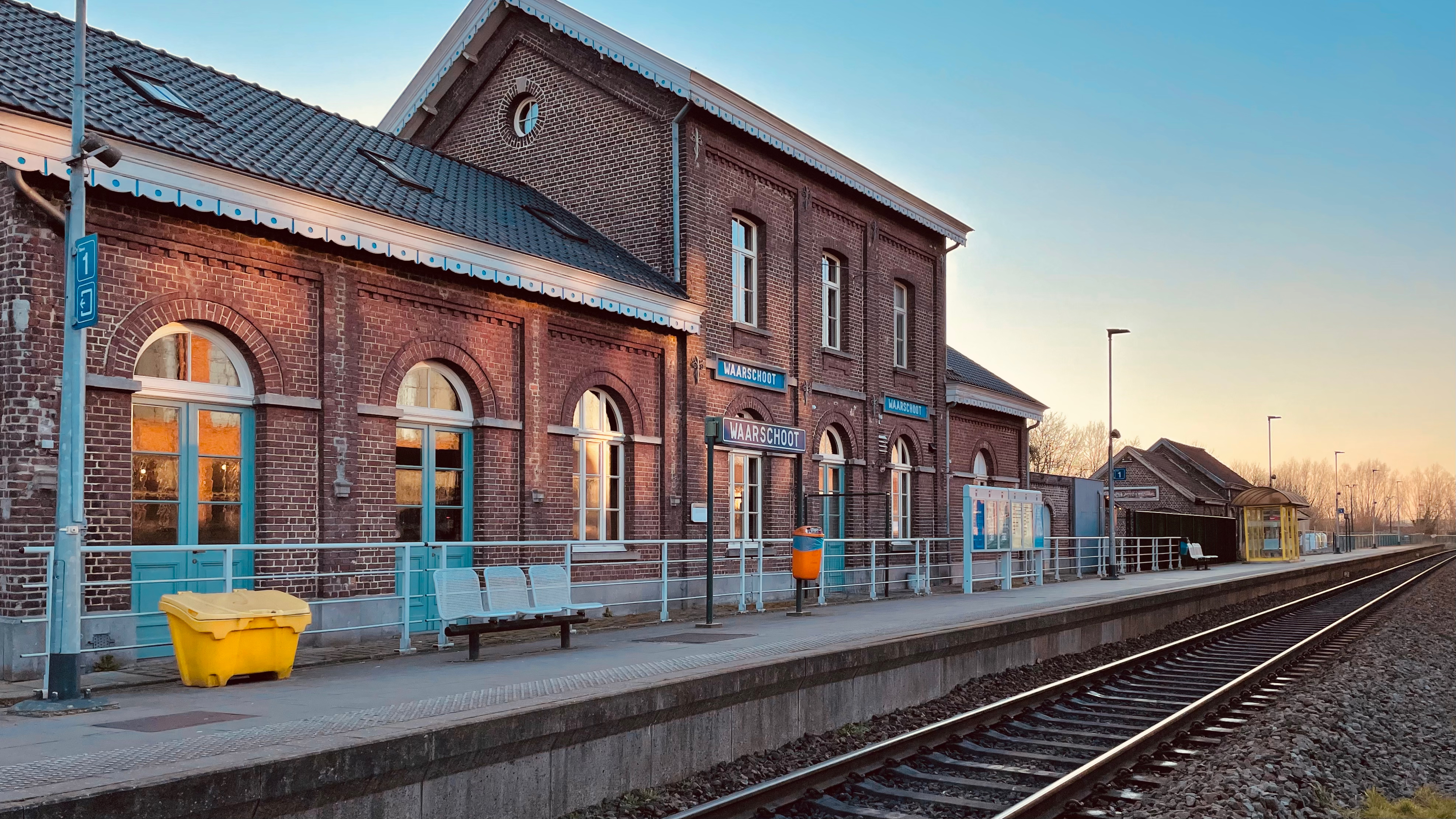
- Waarschoot railway station

General information
- Location: Stationsplein, Waarschoot
- Coordinates: 51°09′17″N 3°36′52″E
- System: Railway Station
- Owner: National Railway Company of Belgium
- Line: 58
- Platforms: 1
- Tracks: 1

Other information
- Station code: LWT

History
- Opened: 25 June 1861
- Rebuilt: 29 May 1988

Passengers
- 2009: 52572
Location

Waarschoot is a railway station in Waarschoot, East Flanders, Belgium. The station opened on 25 June 1861 on the Line 58. The train services are operated by NMBS/SNCB.

== Train services ==
The station is served by the following service(s):

- Local services (L-05) Eeklo - Ghent - Oudenaarde - Ronse
- Local services (L-05) Eeklo - Ghent - Oudenaarde - Kortrijk (weekdays)

Preceding station	NMBS/SNCB	Following station
Eeklo Terminus	L 05 weekdays	Sleidinge towards Ronse or Kortrijk
Eeklo Terminus	L 05 weekends	Sleidinge towards Ronse
