= Sleidinge =

- Borough
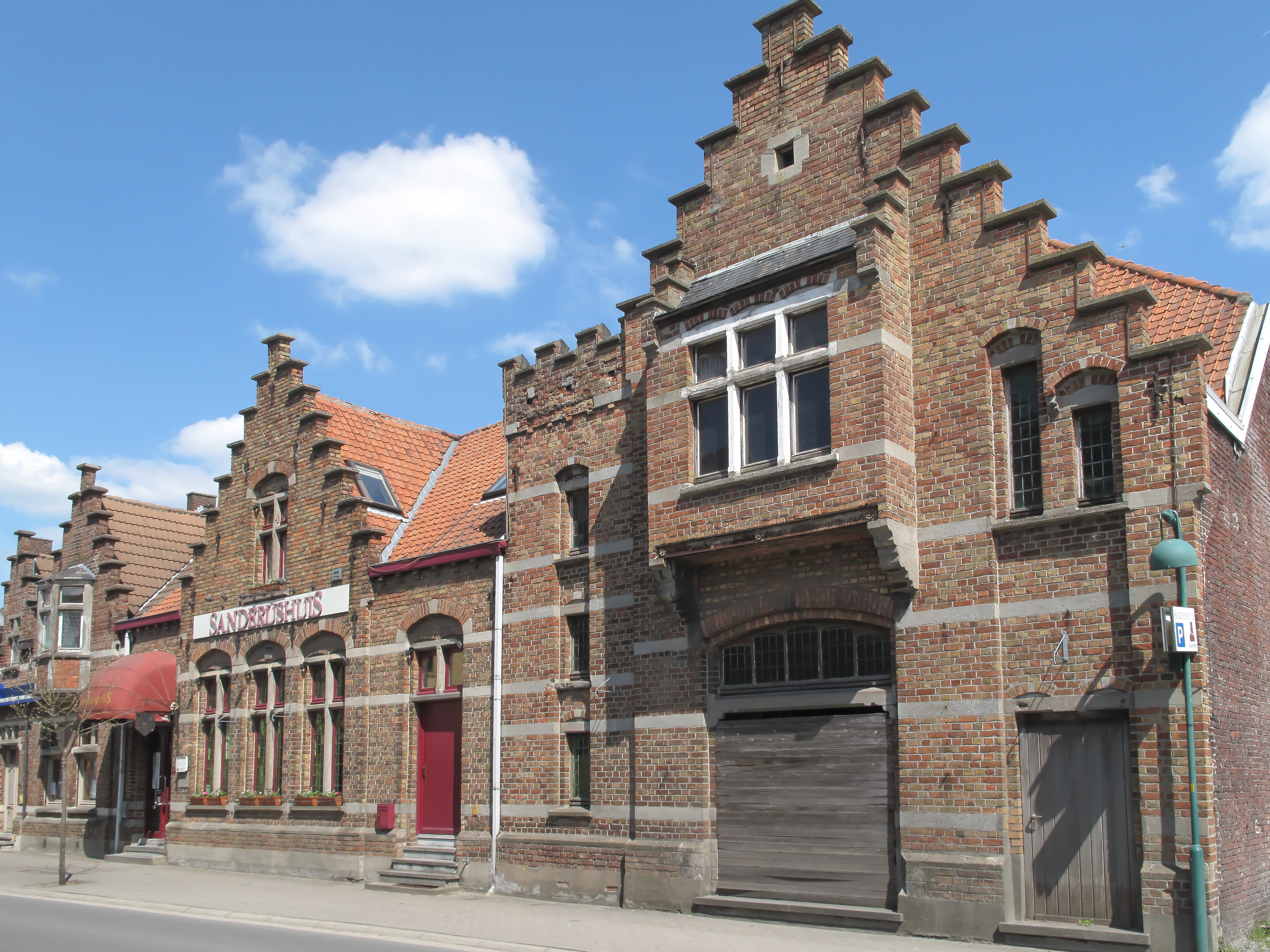
- Former inn Sanderushuis

- Location in Belgium
- Coordinates: 51.1305°N 3.6750°E
- Country: Belgium
- Region: Flemish Region
- Province: East Flanders
- Municipality: Evergem

Area
  - Total: 20.90 km^{2} (8.07 sq mi)

Population (2021)
  - Total: 7,630
  - Density: 365/km^{2} (946/sq mi)
- Time zone: CET

Sleidinge is a borough of the municipality of Evergem in the province of East Flanders, Belgium. It is located about 10 kilometres (6.2 mi) north-west of Ghent.

== History ==
Sleidinge was originally located in a large heath and forest area. The village was first mentioned in 1220 as Scleidingha. The etymology is unclear. In 1248, the area was cut in two. The eastern part belonged to the Abbey of St. Bavo in Ghent. The western became the possession of the Count of Flanders. The parish used to belong to the Diocese of Tournai until 1559 when it was transferred to the Diocese of Ghent. The French Revolution resulted in the reunification of both parts into a single municipality.

In 1861, the Sleidinge railway station opened on the railway line from Ghent to Bruges. From the 1880s onwards, Sleidinge started to industrialise and contained five textile factories. During the 20th century, the village developed into a commuter's town. Sleidinge was an independent municipality until 1977 when it was merged into Evergem.

== Buildings ==
The first St Joris and St Godelieve Church was built between 1260 and 1280, and burnt down in 1662. The current three aisled hall church was built in 1664. The tower was added in 1715, and in 1740, it received its needle spire. The church has an organ from around 1750 built by Van Peteghem organ builders and is a protected monument.

== Notable people ==
- Johan De Muynck (born 1948), former professional road racing cyclist
- Alfred Delcourt (1929–2012), football referee
- Johan Geirnaert (born 1951), long-distance runner
- Wilfried Martens (1936–2013), politician and former prime-minister
- Jan Roegiers (1944–2013), professor, university archivist and librarian

== Gallery ==
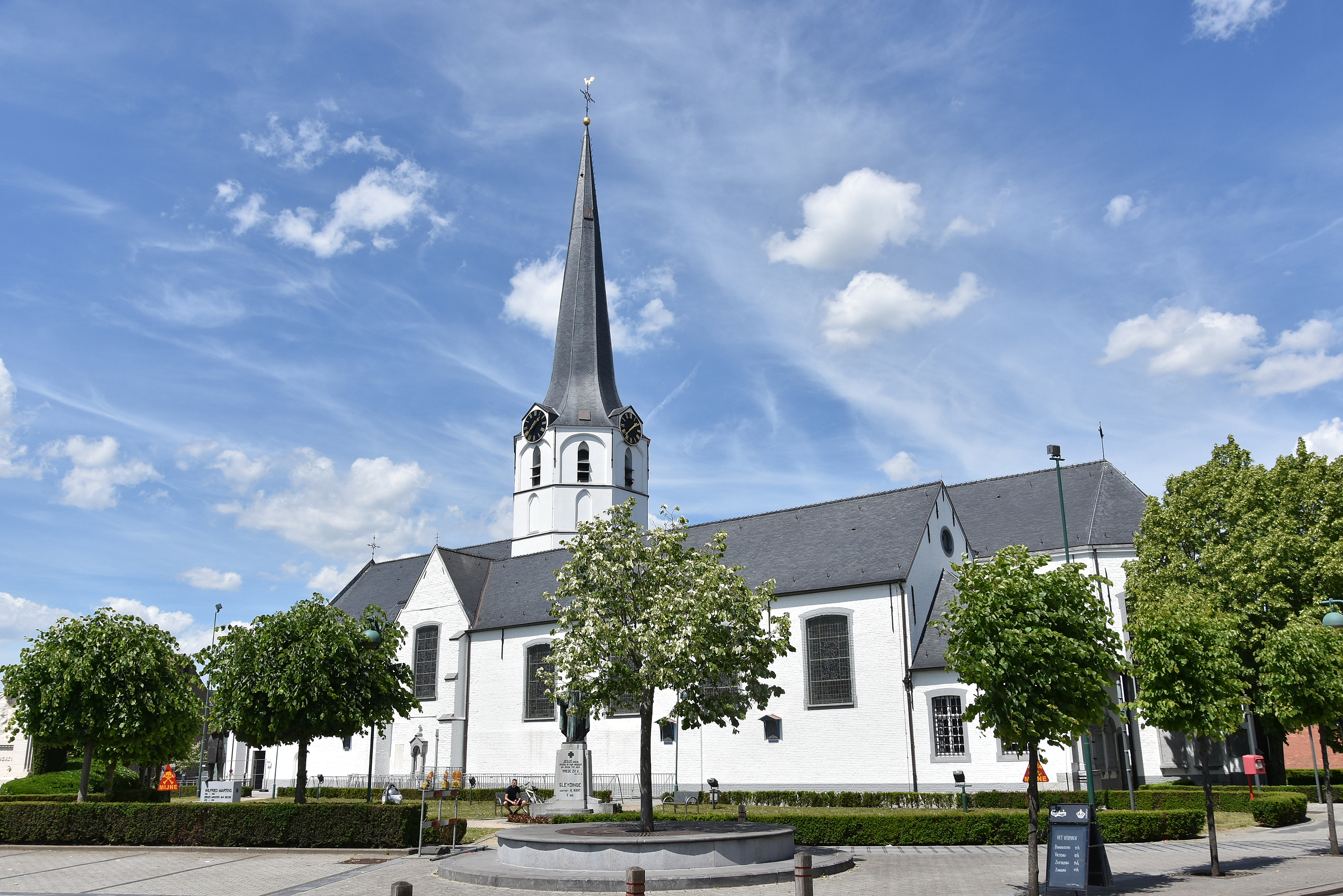
St Joris and St Godelieve Church

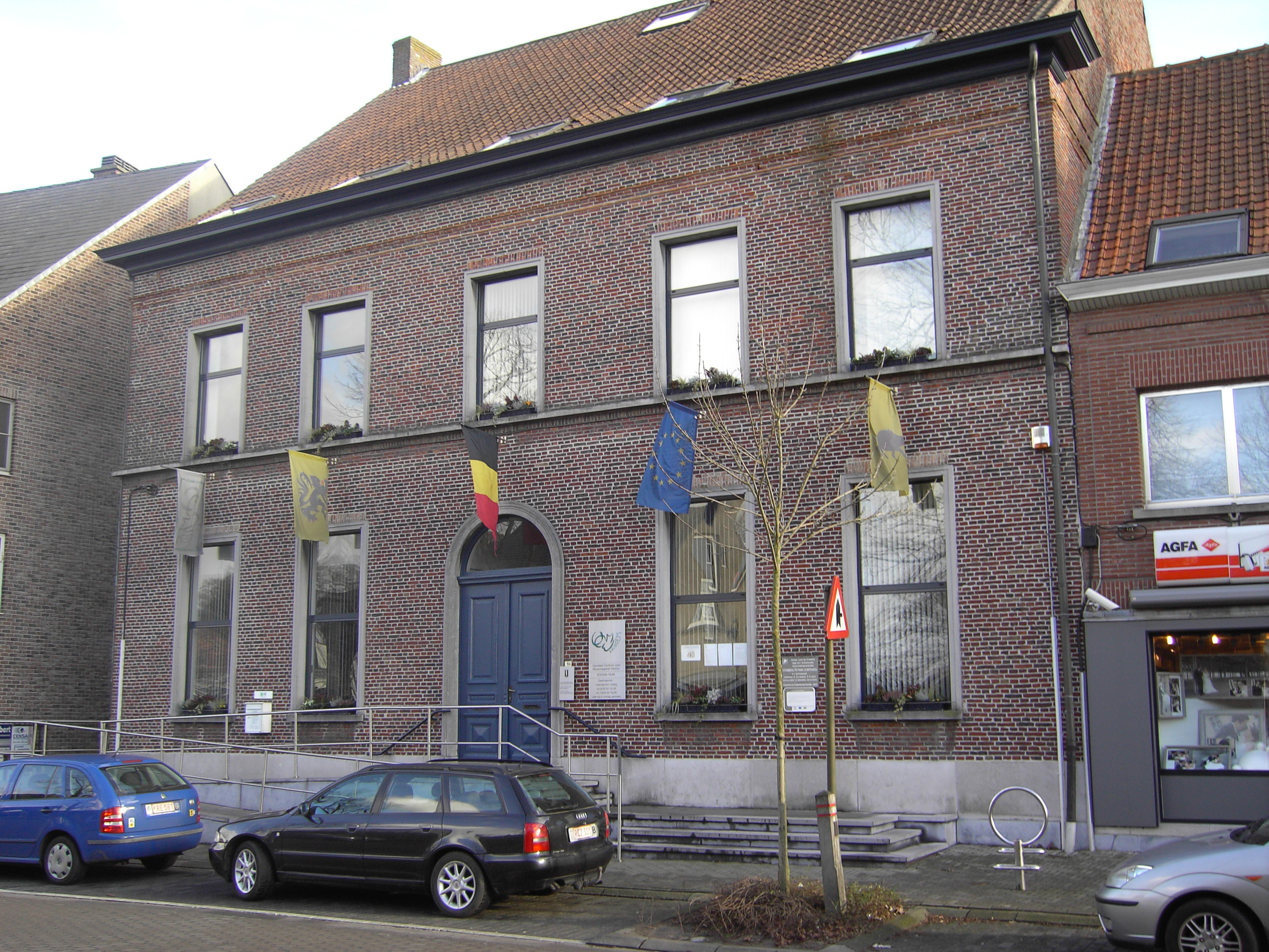
Former town hall

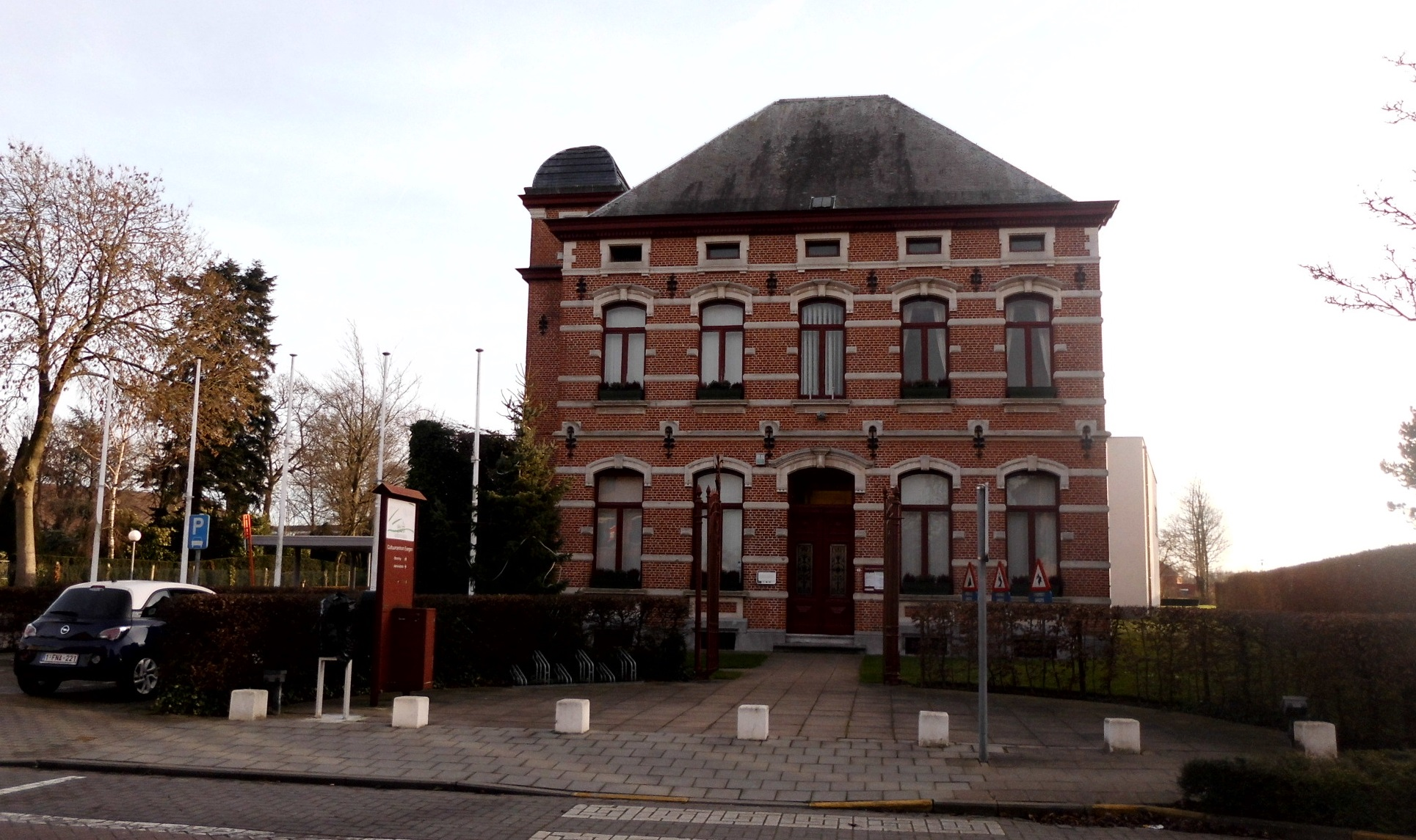
Villa in Sleidinge

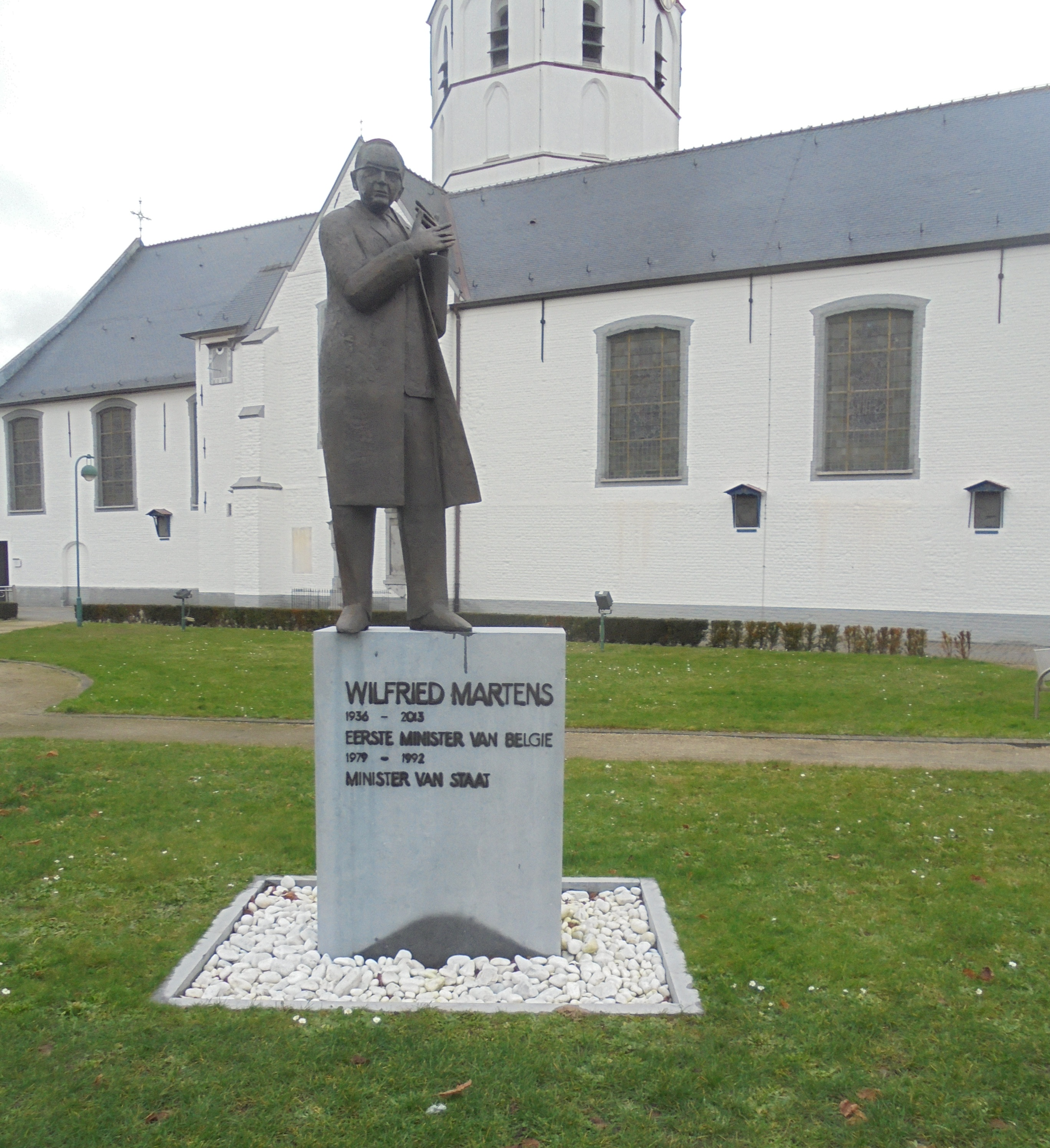
Wilfried Martens statue
