= Angelus de Baets =

Angelus "Ange" de Baets (24 November 1793 – 24 April 1855) was a Belgian painter of portraits and architectural subjects. He was born at Everghem in 1793. He executed a great number of pictures, most of them views in Ghent and its environs, which are much esteemed. He died at Ghent in 1855.
