= Waremme =

City in Liège Province, Wallonia, Belgium

Waremme Wareme (Walloon): Borgworm (Dutch)
- Municipality
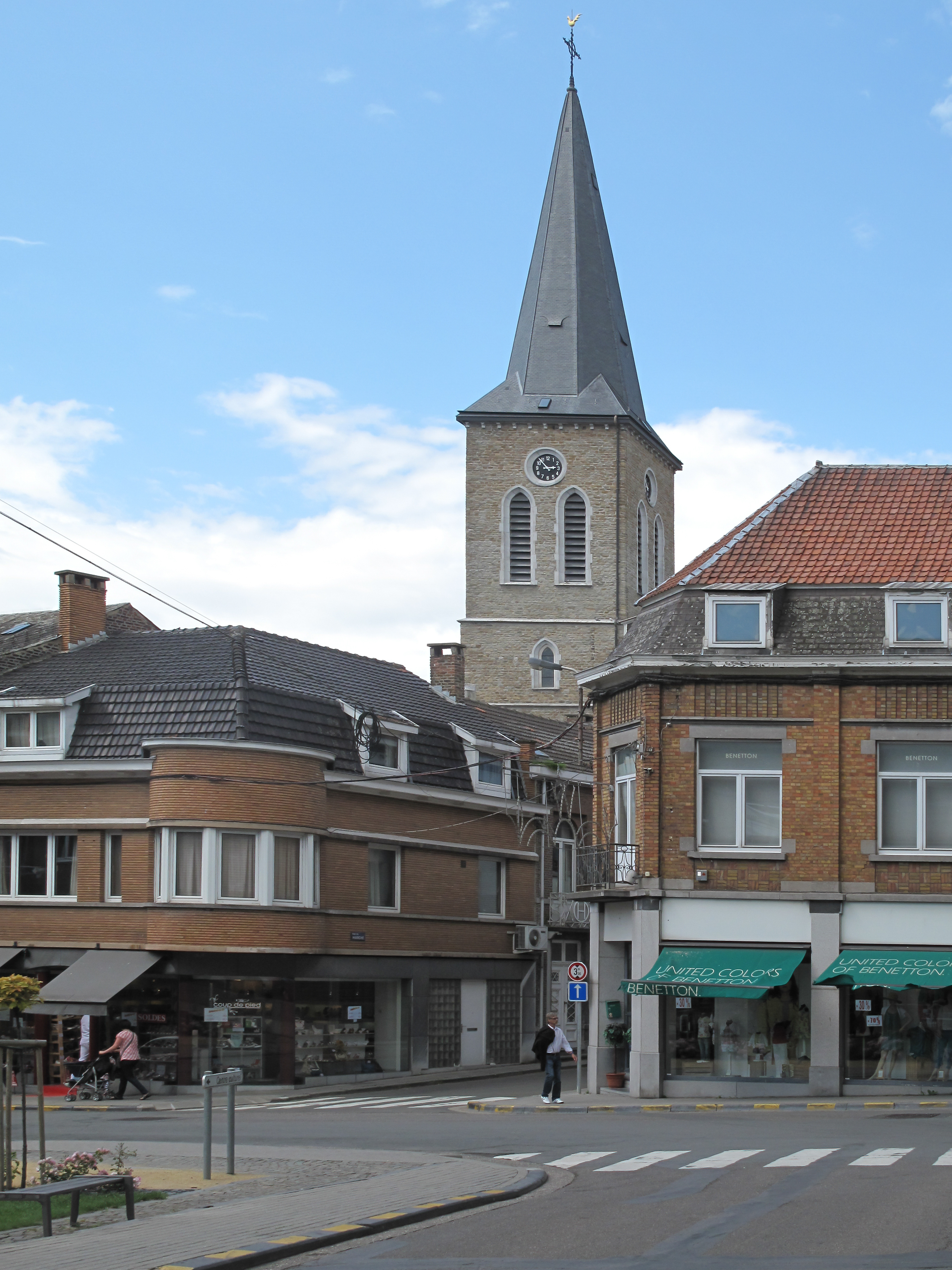

- Coat of arms

- Location of Waremme in the province of Liège
- Interactive map of Waremme
- Location in Belgium
- Coordinates: 50°41′51″N 05°15′20″E
- Country: Belgium
- Community: French Community
- Region: Wallonia
- Province: Liège
- Arrondissement: Waremme

Government
  - Mayor: Jacques Chabot (PS)
  - Governing party: PS-POUR WAREMME

Area
  - Total: 30.89 km^{2} (11.93 sq mi)

Population (2018-01-01)
  - Total: 15,168
  - Density: 491.0/km^{2} (1,272/sq mi)
- Postal codes: 4300
- NIS code: 64074
- Area codes: 019
- Website: www.waremme.be

Waremme (French: [waʁɛm]; Walloon: Wareme; Dutch: Borgworm [ˈbɔr(ə)xˌʋɔr(ə)m]) is a municipality and city of Wallonia located in the province of Liège, in Belgium.

The city is located on the River Geer (Dutch: Jeker), in the loessic Haspengouw region. The economy is based on the cultivation of cereals and sugar beet, and on the food industry.

The municipality includes the following districts: Bettincourt, Bleret, Bovenistier, Grand-Axhe, Lantremange, Oleye, and Waremme.

== History ==
Several findings were unearthed near Waremme containing remnants of Neolithic and Bronze Age settlements. The main Roman road linking Bavay to Cologne passed right through the territory. Tumuli and Roman villas were found nearby. Romans have also left a horse burial.

The medieval hamlet of Woromia was cited for the first time in 965. On February 5, 1078, Woromia was ceded to the Prince-Bishopric of Liège, together with its castle, five mills, and six breweries.

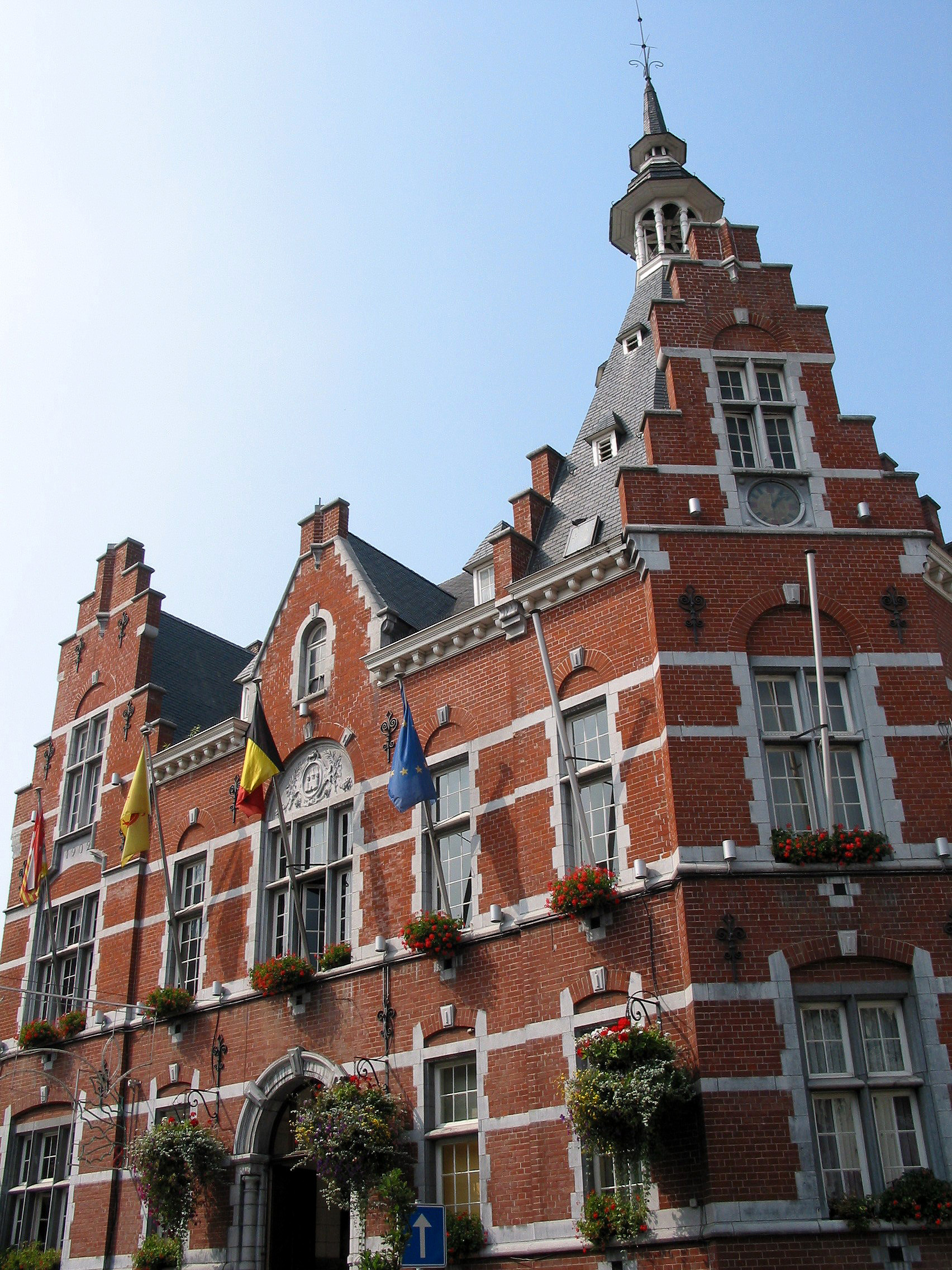
Waremme City Hall

By 1215, with its 815 inhabitants, it had grown to town size. Its frontier position near the Duchy of Brabant, however, attracted several raids from the duke, causing it to be burnt to the ground and rebuilt at least a couple of times. In the 14th century, the town built a market place and a hospital, slowly becoming an important regional center, where coins were issued and important meetings held.

During his conquest of the Prince-Bishopric of Liège, Charles the Bold burnt the city once more in 1468. In the 16th century, the town became one of the 21 bonnes villes (main cities) of the prince-bishopric. In 1748, a quarter of the city was again destroyed by fire, this time accidentally. In 1792, the French Revolutionary troops entered the city and closed the convents. Three years later, the Prince-Bishopric of Liège was dissolved and the city became French.

The 19th century was prosperous, thanks to the advent of the railways linking Mechelen to Ans, and the construction of two sugar refineries and several schools. In 1904, Guillaume Moës established his engine and locomotive company Ateliers Moës-Freres in Waremme; they continued manufacturing in the town until October 2013. World War I did not bring any destruction to the city, except for that of the old surrounding walls. World War II, however, was a lot worse as half of the city was destroyed by air raids, only days before Liberation Day. The city then counted about 5,000 inhabitants.

== Attractions ==
- The City Hall dates from 1900.
- The town's main church dates from 1881 and houses 14th-century baptismal fonts.
- A natural reserve can also be found on the territory of Waremme.

== Person born in Waremme ==
- Edmond Leburton, prime minister of Belgium in the 1970s (1915–1997)

== Twin towns – sister cities ==
Waremme is twinned with:

- Skopje, North Macedonia
- Gérardmer, France
- Gallinaro, Italy
