= Ateliers Moës-Freres =

Belgian engineering company

- Industry: Engineering
- Founded: 1904
- Defunct: 1969
- Headquarters: Waremme, Belgium
- Products: Diesel engines and Locomotives

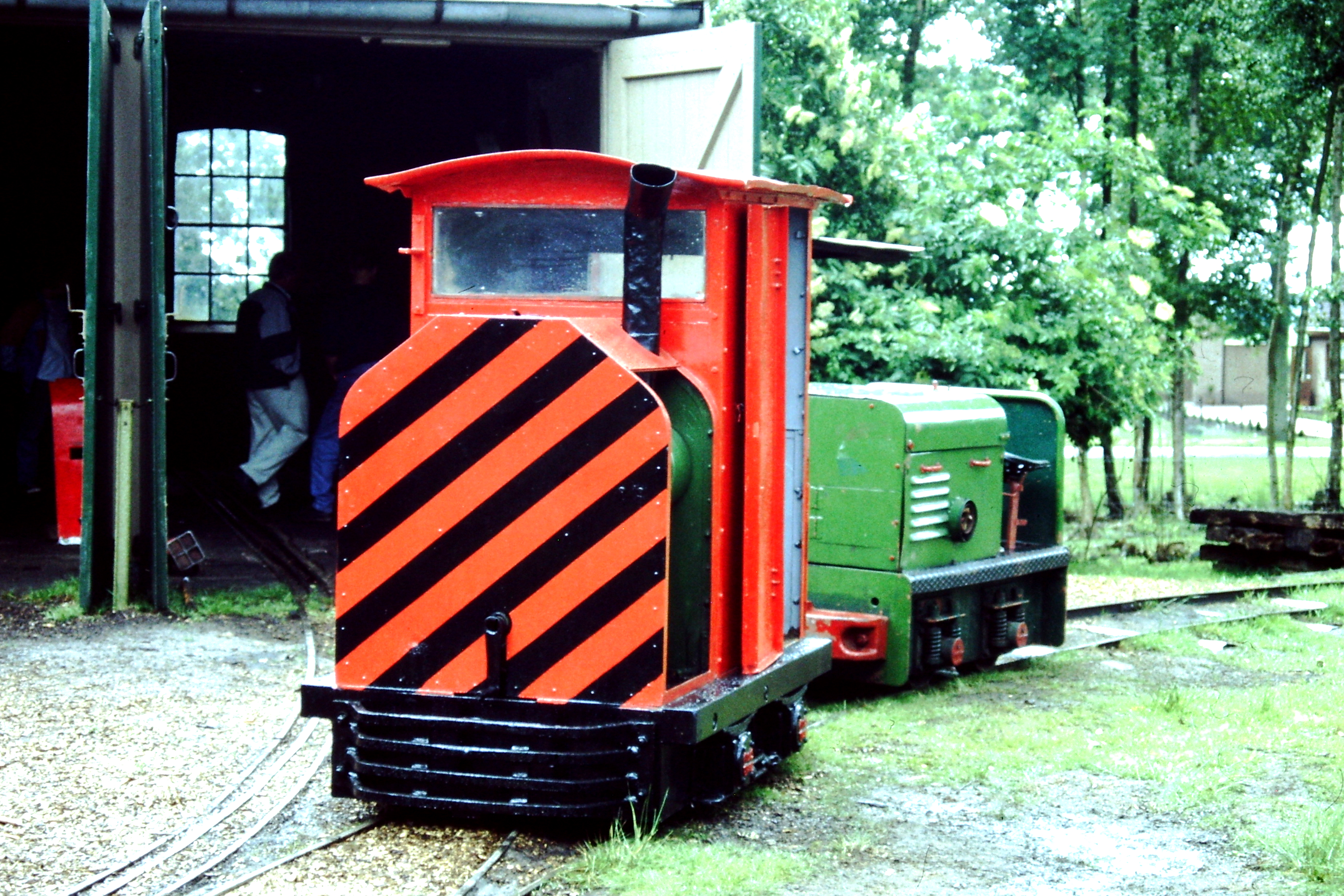
A Moës diesel locomotive at the Industrieel Smalspoor Museum

Ateliers Moës-Freres was an engineering company based in Waremme, Belgium, specialising in engines and locomotives. The company was founded in 1904 by Guillaume Moës (1854–1929). The company saw its greatest success between the First and Second World Wars. It survived as an independent company until 1969 when it was acquired by VMF Stork-Werkspoor Diesel of Amsterdam (now part of Wärtsilä).

== Founding ==
Guillaume Moës was born in 1854 in the hamlet of Bleret between Remicourt and Waremme. As a young man, he moved to Waremme where he founded a steam mill. His eldest son Édouard as born in 1880 and at the turn of the century he developed an internal combustion engine that replaced the mill's steam engine. Guillaume's second son, Auguste (born 1882) turned out to be a talented salesman who promoted the new Moës engine and was able to quickly gain orders from local factories. The mill was quickly turned over to engine manufacturing and in 1904 a new company, Ateliers Moës-Freres, was set up to concentrate on the burgeoning engine business.

== Pre-war years ==
The company found early success, building and selling several hundred of its engines each year from 1905 onwards. The company continued to expand in the years leading up to the First World War. In 1912 a spacious new factory was built in Waremme. The company suspended production at the outbreak of war, having produced more than 2500 engines.

== After the First World War ==
In 1918, the company restarted production, with the youngest of Guillaume's sons, Paul (born 1893), joining the family firm. They expanded into a wide range of engine production, including diesel, hot-bulb and electric engines. In the early 1920s the company began production of narrow gauge locomotives using their diesel engines as motive power. These early locomotives had bodies that resembled traditional steam locomotives to encourage the adoption of this new technology. Guillaume died in 1929, and the company was taken over by his three sons.

In the 1930s, the company changed its name to SA Moteurs Moës, Waremme. Locomotive production expanded into specialist mining locomotives for use underground, and small standard gauge shunting locomotives. Moteurs Moës developed an international reputation, selling equipment to France, Italy, the Netherlands, the Belgian Congo and Asia.

== The Second World War and afterwards ==
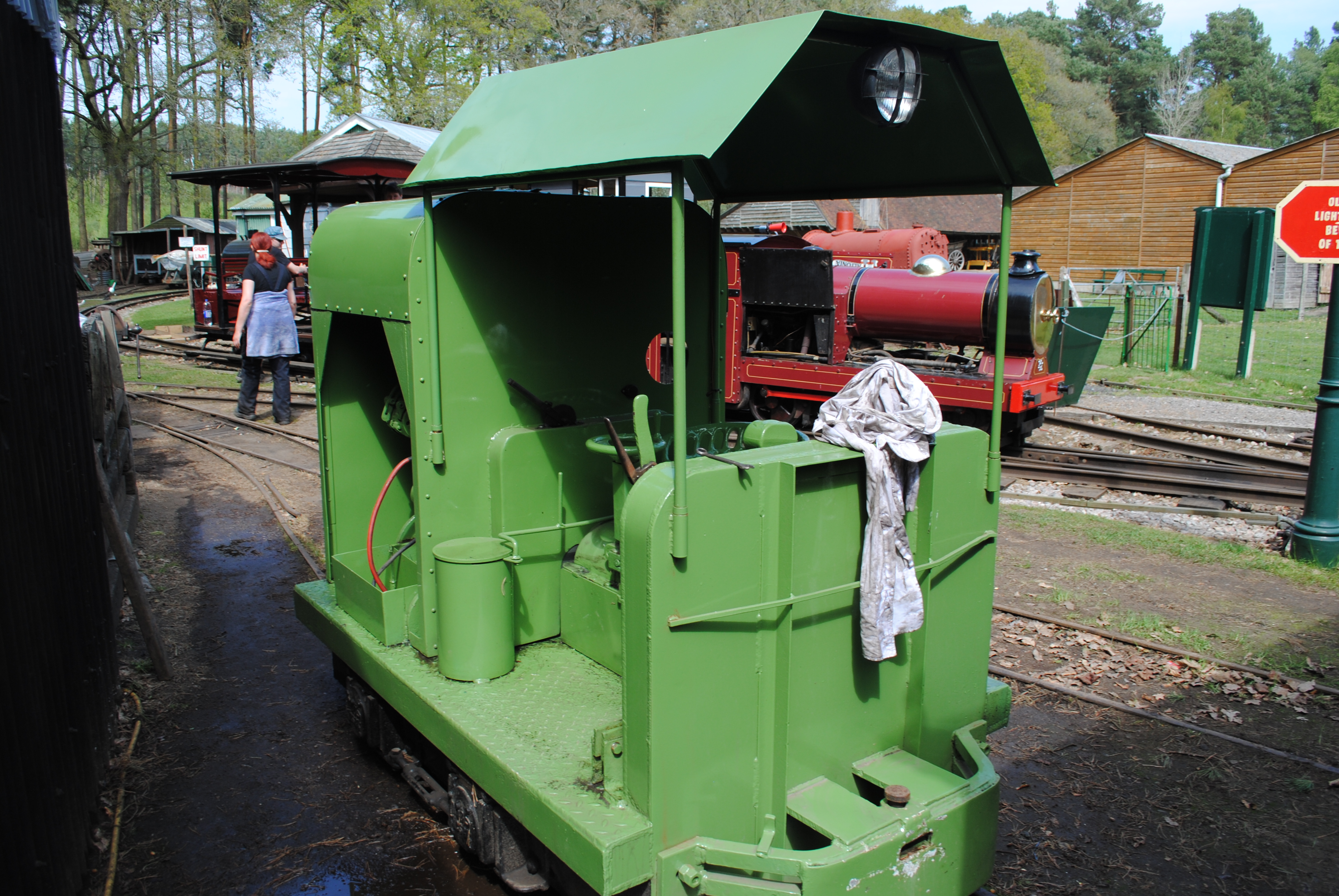
1955 Moes locomotive at the Old Kiln Light Railway

During the Second World War Moteurs Moës reduced production, but kept operating throughout. They developed a reputation for protecting their workers during the Nazi occupation of Belgium.

After the end of the War, Moteurs Moës rebuilt its business, winning major government-subsidized contracts for marine engines. But, as war-surplus engines came onto the market, this business came to an end and Moteurs Moës focused back onto the narrow gauge locomotive market, particularly for coal mining. In the 1960s, the Belgian coal mining industry collapsed, and with it an important market for the company. The company re-focused onto diesel engines and renamed itself Moës Diesel in 1957.

Paul Moës died in 1967. Two years later, the company was acquired by Dutch group VMF Stork-Werkspoor Diesel, but remained as an independent division under the Moës Diesel name. The division developed new hydrostatic narrow gauge locomotives, an improved mining locomotive, and a new type of standard gauge shunting locomotive.

In 1993, the Moës Diesel division was sold to the BIA Group of Belgium and focused on selling generators and pumps built by the Hatz company. In March 2013, the division's name was changed to Moës Energy. In October 2013, all manufacturing at Waremme ceased.

== Sources ==
- Delgaudinne, Thierry. Le Jour Huy Waremme.
- Delforge, Paul (September 2012). Famille Moës, dans Grands hommes de Hesbaye. du Musée de la Hesbaye. pp. 65–70.
- Phillipe Destinez; Jaques Lanneau; Claude Lombart. Hesbaye, qui sont tes grandes hommes?.
- A. Bongaards. www.moteurs-moes.net.
