= Lias (journal) =

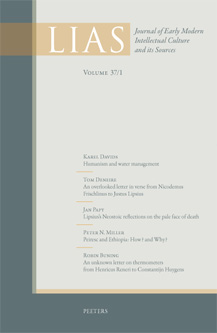
- Discipline: History of learning and education
- Language: Multilingual
- Edited by: D. van Miert

Publication details
- History: 1974-present
- Publisher: Peeters Academic Publishing
- Frequency: Biannual

Standard abbreviations
- ISO 4: Lias

Indexing
- ISSN: 0304-0003
- OCLC no.: 1798652

Links
- Journal homepage; Online access

Lias, Journal of Early Modern Intellectual Culture and its Sources (Dutch for sheaf or file; French: liasse) is a biannual double-blind peer-reviewed academic journal covering the history of learning and education in a very broad sense. The editor-in-chief is Dirk van Miert.

== History ==
The journal was established in 1974 by a group of Dutch and Belgian scholars, and subtitled Sources and Documents relating to the Early Modern History of Ideas. The aim was to provide a platform for the edition and study of primary sources of relatively small size pertaining to the cultural and intellectual history of Early Modern Europe. Until 2010, the journal was published by Academic Publishers Associated. Back-issues up till 2004 are freely available. The majority of the articles in the first 36 issues concentrated on texts from, or relating to, the Low Countries. In 2010, the journal was taken over by a new publisher, Peeters Academic Publishing. It appears on the "initial list" of history journals in the European Reference Index of the Humanities of the European Science Foundation.

== Scope ==
The journal covers the periods from Early Humanism (the fourteenth century) to the late Enlightenment (the early nineteenth century). It prints source texts in their original languages without restrictions. However, introduction and footnotes must be written in English, although they may be in French for French sources. The journal also accepts studies based on neglected printed sources.
