= Belgian railway line 58 =

Railway line in Belgium

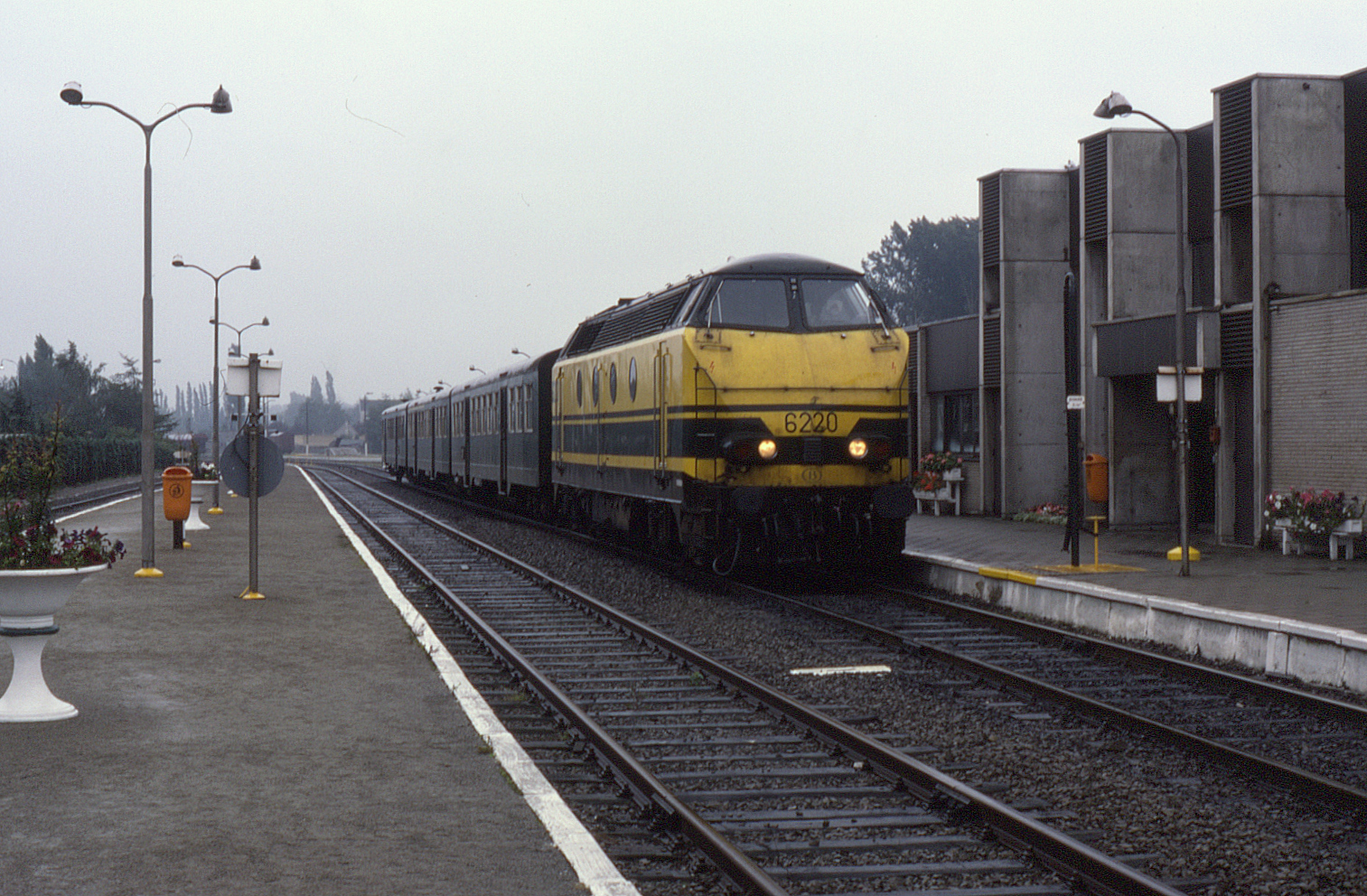
- A train at Eeklo station in 1987

Overview
- Status: Operational
- Locale: Belgium
- Termini: Y Oost Ledeberg; Eeklo railway station

Service
Services
- Operator(s): National Railway Company of Belgium

History
- Opened: Ghent - Eeklo: 25 June 1861; Eeklo - Maldegem: 16 November 1862; Maldegem - Bruges: 22 June 1863
- Closed: Bruges - Maldegem: 1959

Technical
- Line length: 21 km (13 mi)
- Number of tracks: double track Y Oost Ledeberg - Wondelgem: 2 single track Wondelgem - Maldegem: 1
- Track gauge: 1,435 mm (4 ft 8 1/2 in) standard gauge
- Electrification: none
- Operating speed: 120 km/h Eeklo - Evergem; 35 mph Evergem - Dampoort; 55 mph Dampoort - Gent-Sint-Pieters
Route map
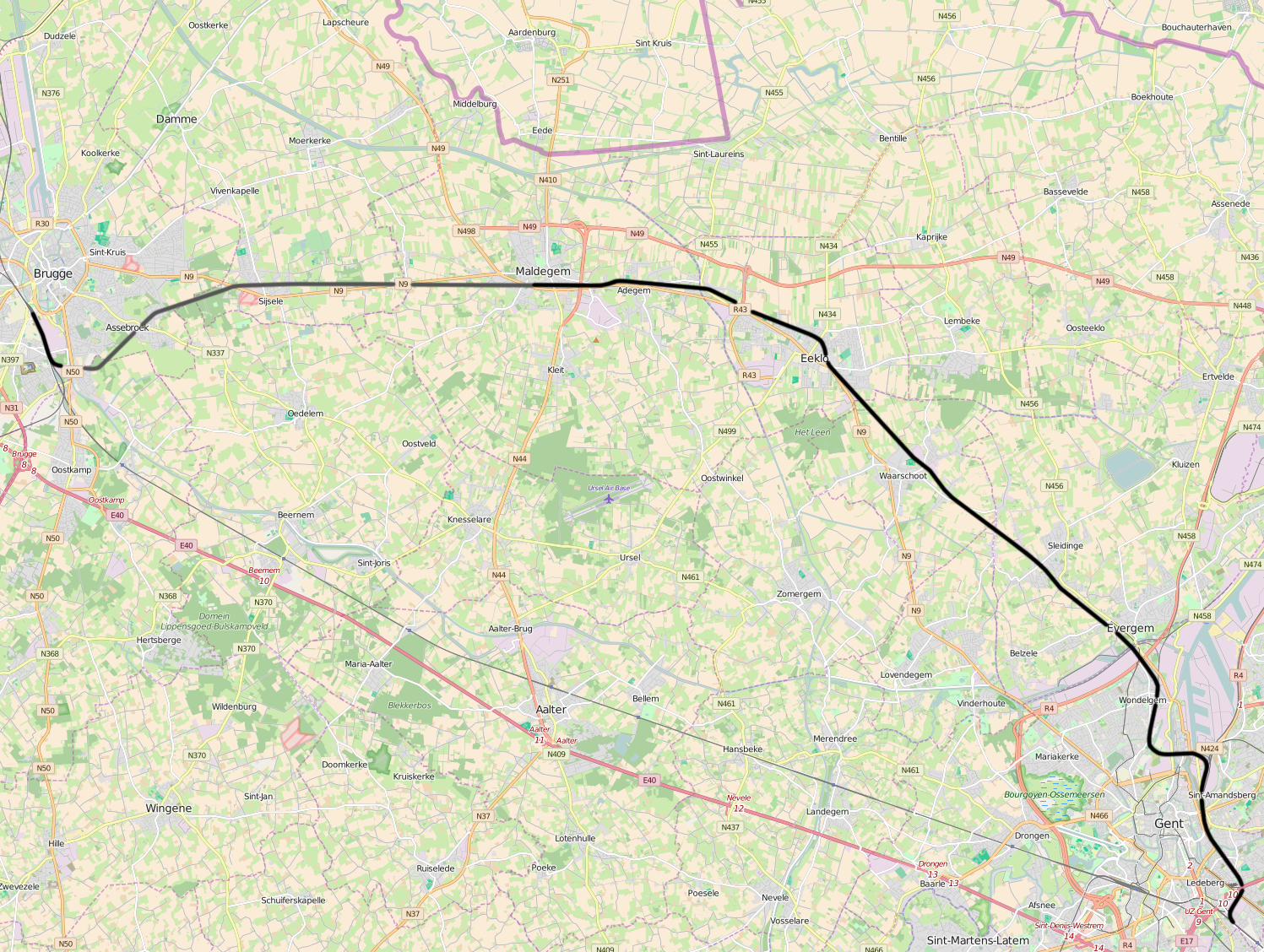

Belgian railway line 58 connects Ghent with Eeklo. The line is approx. 14 miles long. In its early days the line also connected to Bruges.

== Current condition ==
The railway line speed is 120 km/h. The railway is double track between Y Ledeberg (origin) and Wondelgem, and electrified between Y ledeberg and Gent-Dampoort. This last station is part of the connection between Ghent and Antwerp (Line 59). Further is the line single track and unelectrified.

Section between Eeklo and Maldegem is run as a heritage railway line by Stoomcentrum Maldegem.

== Train service ==
The following services currently the serve the line:

- local service Eeklo - Ghent (weekdays)
- rush hour service Eeklo - Ghent (weekdays)
- local service Eeklo - Ghent - Ronse (weekends)

Preceding station	NMBS/SNCB	Following station
Terminus	Regional Local; Weekdays	Waarschoot towards Gent-Sint-Pieters
Terminus	Regional Rush hour Weekdays	Waarschoot towards Gent-Sint-Pieters
Terminus	Regional Weekends	Waarschoot towards Ronse

== Connection tracks ==
- 58/1: Y West triangle Ledeberg (lijn 50E) - Y North triangleLedeberg (lijn 58)
- 58/2: Y Muide (lijn 58) - Gent-Zeehaven (lijn 59B, lijn 204/1)
