= Eeklo railway station =

Railway station in East Flanders, Belgium

Eeklo
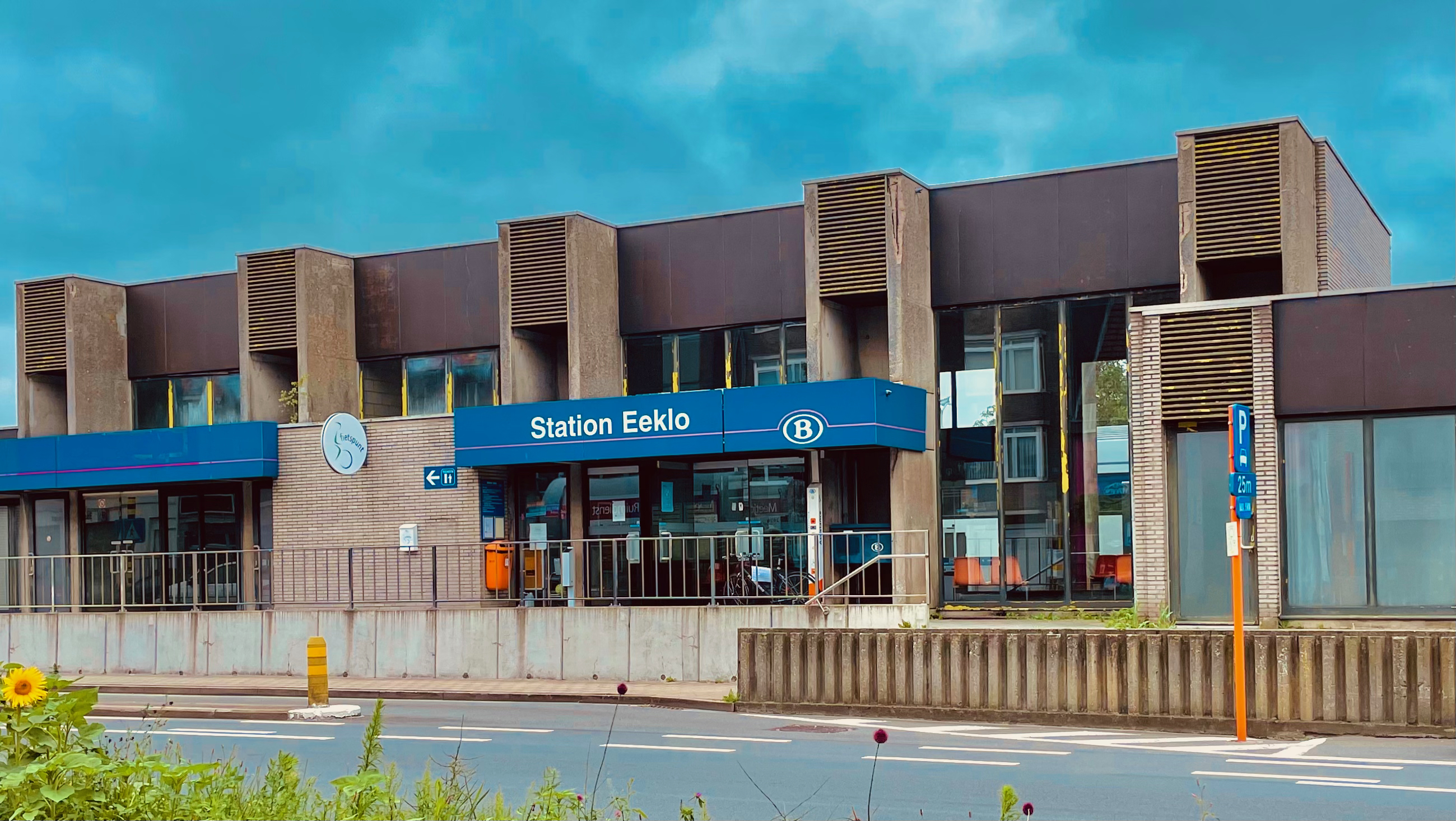
- Eeklo railway station

General information
- Location: Kon. Astridplein, Eeklo
- Coordinates: 51°10′53″N 3°34′27″E
- System: Railway Station
- Owner: National Railway Company of Belgium
- Line: 58
- Platforms: 2
- Tracks: 3

Other information
- Station code: FKLO

History
- Opened: 25 June 1861
- Closed: 1991 (goods)

Passengers
- 2009: 237068
Location

Eeklo is a railway station in Eeklo, East Flanders, Belgium. The station opened on 25 June 1861 on the Line 58. The train services are operated by NMBS/SNCB.

The current building was built in the 80's by architect Jacques Devincke. The railway station is in the city centre.

The station used to not be the terminus with the line continuing via Maldegem to Bruges . The Eeklo - Maldegem section of this line still operates as a museum railway by the Stoomcentrum Maldegem . For practical reasons, this association has constructed a platform on the other side of Oostveldstraat, where their museum trains stop. The connection between that line and the SNCB network is currently only used sporadically. The station has 3 platform tracks and one (decommissioned) dead end track.

== Train services ==
The station is served by the following service(s):

S51	Eeklo - Ghent - Ronse	Monday to Saturday: 1×/h. Sundays and public holidays: 1×/2h.
S51	Eeklo - Ghent-Sint-Pieters	During peak hours, 1 ride to Geraardsbergen

Preceding station	NMBS/SNCB	Following station
Terminus	L 05 weekdays, except holidays	Waarschoot towards Ronse or Kortrijk
Terminus	L 05 weekends	Waarschoot towards Ronse

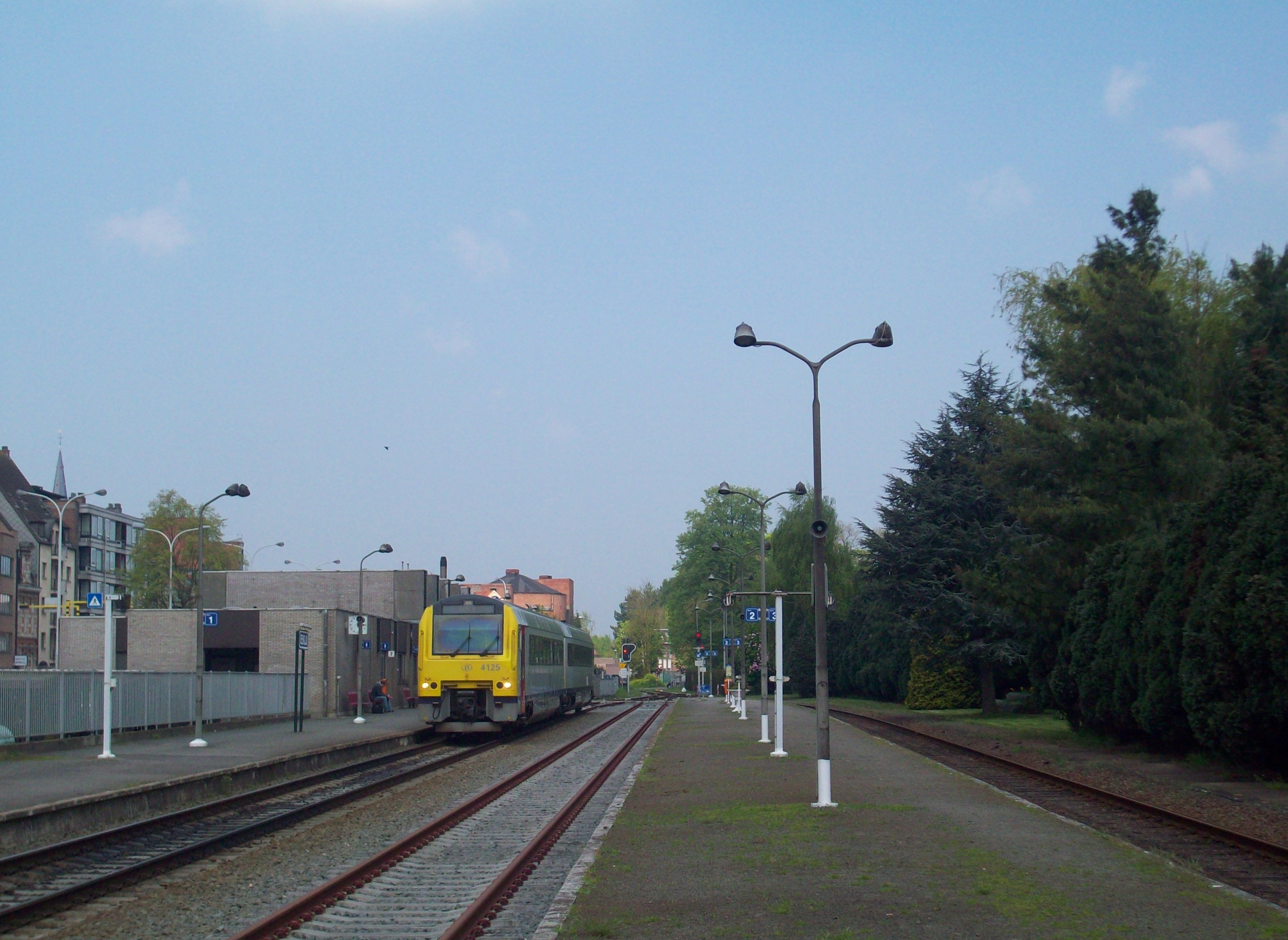
View of the platforms of Eeklo railway station
