= De Pinte =

- Municipality
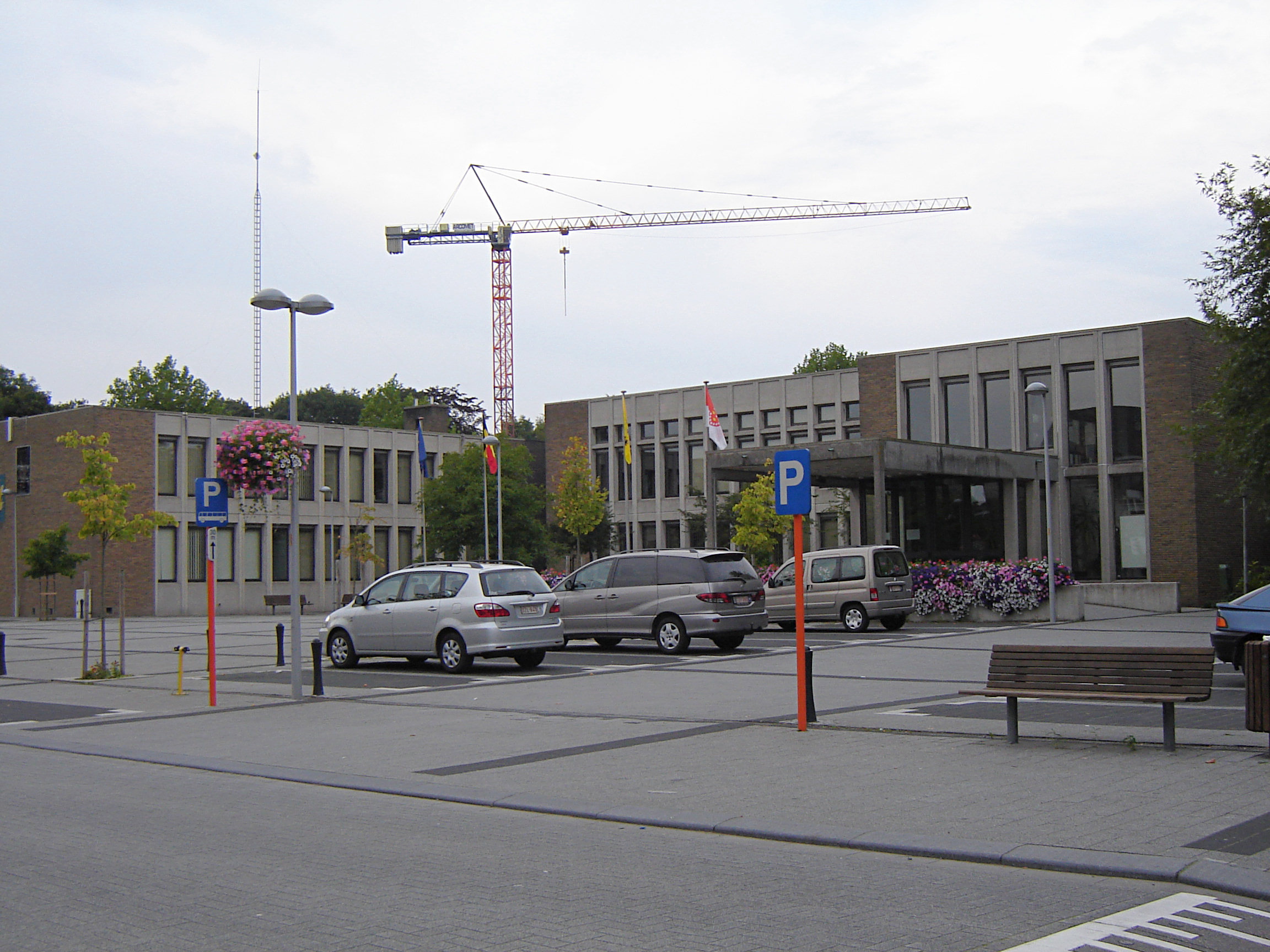
- De Pinte town hall

- Flag Coat of arms

- Location of De Pinte in East Flanders
- Interactive map of De Pinte
- Location in Belgium
- Coordinates: 51°00′N 03°39′E
- Country: Belgium
- Community: Flemish Community
- Region: Flemish Region
- Province: East Flanders
- Arrondissement: Ghent

Government
  - Mayor: Vincent Van Peteghem (CD&V)
  - Governing parties: N-VA and CD&V

Population (2022-01-01)
  - Total: 11,046
- Postal codes: 9840
- NIS code: 44012
- Area codes: 09
- Website: www.depinte.be

De Pinte (Dutch pronunciation: [də ˈpɪntə]) is a former municipality located in the Belgian province of East Flanders. Before its existence as an independent municipality in 1868, De Pinte was a part of Nazareth. The municipality comprises the towns of De Pinte proper and Zevergem. In 2021, De Pinte had a total population of 10,990. The total area is 17.78 km².

== History ==
The name of the municipality is issued from an inn, which was called "Het Pijntken", which was situated in the actual Pintestraat 69, and which was firstly used as the name of the municipality when it became independent of Nazareth on 2. June 1868 and it was called 'Little Nazareth" at that time. At the end of the 19th century many horticultural companies came in this area and further on in the 20th century, they were all parceled out. De Pinte became also a train station between Ghent and Kortrijk (as from 1839) and Ghent-Oudenaarde (as from 1857). The territory remained a vast stretch of moorland of the Abbey of Ghent Saint-Peter, which was called Scheldevelde. As from the 13th century, there was in the east of the current village center, a mining farm located, in which activities started from the 18th century with a systematic exploration. On the Ferrari-map from the 1770s, the place appears as a rural area with scattered hamlets and country estates. In the place of the current center, the map still shows the hamlet Pintestraete. In 1791 there was already a first request for the establishment of an auxiliary church. Its construction was started, but was soon stopped due to the French occupation.

The colours of De Pinte are red and white. The flag can be described as semi-red and semi-white, with a shield and three eight-pointed stars of gold (2:1), next to twelve silver blocks (4:1:7). The ratios are 2:3.

When the community was founded at the end of the Ancien Régime, the area was part of the community of Nazareth. Sometimes, the village was called "Little Nazareth". Already in the Dutch period (1829) a request for autonomy was presented under the name "William Village", but was refused. In 1838, new plans for a church were approved and 1839, a first church was consecrated. In the middle of the 19th century, De Pinte intersected by railway lines, the railway Ghent-Kortrijk (1839) and Ghent-Oudenaarde (1857). A railway station was opened De Pinte. On 2 June 1868, the community became independent of Nazareth and became an independent municipality under the name De Pinte. Late 19th century, there were a number of horticultural establishments, which were executed later in the twentieth century.

In 1977, the former municipalities of De Pinte and Zevergem were joined into the new municipality De Pinte. The whimsical south border of the municipality was straightened by boundary adjustments until the Scheldt.

== Politics ==
The mayor of De Pinte is Vincent Van Peteghem. He's the head of a College of Mayor and Aldermen of the political parties CD&V and NV-A.

== List of mayors ==
1976-1982 : Hilde Ceyssens DPZ

1982-1998 : Herbert Overdenborger CD&V

1998-2012 : Martin Van Peteghem CD&V

2013-2019 : Hilde Claeys RUIMTE

2019-2025: Vincent Van Peteghem CD&V

2020-2025: Lieve Van Lancker CD&V (waarnemend burgemeester)

== Communities ==
De Pinte has 2 communities, De Pinte proper and Zevergem, with the former having greater population density but their size are similar. The Oudenaardse Steenweg (N60) is generally considered to be the border between the two municipalities.

Name	Surface	Inhabitants
De Pinte	8,85 km²	
Zevergem	9,13 km²	
Total	17,98 km² (2009)	10.227 (01/01/2010)

Map of De Pinte

The community borders the following communities:

- a. Sint-Denijs-Westrem (Ghent)
- b. Zwijnaarde (Ghent)
- c. Schelderode (Merelbeke)
- d. Melsen (Merelbeke)
- e. Vurste (Gavere)
- f. Eke (Nazareth)
- g. Nazareth
- h. Deurle (Sint-Martens-Latem)
- i. Sint-Martens-Latem

== Transport ==
The community of De Pinte is being crossed by the Oudenaardsesteenweg (N60) which gives direct connection to the highway A14/E17. The railway station of De Pinte gives direct connection to Brussels, Kortrijk, De Panne and Ghent.

== Events ==
Each year the Sneukeltoer bike race is organised in De Pinte, which has an attendance of about 2300 cyclists. The participation fees go to Kom op tegen kanker (a cancer treatment charity). An annual music festival, one of the largest in East-Flanders, Zeverrock, is organised in Zevergem district.

== Notable people of De Pinte/Zevergem ==
- Katrien Devos, Flemish actress
- Tine Ruysschaert, Flemish actress
- Gabriel Ríos, well-known singer
- Evy Gruyaert (Zevergem), TV-host and presenter
- Paul Van Cauwenberge, rector University of Ghent

== Partner cities ==
- Freiamt (Germany)

== Gallery ==
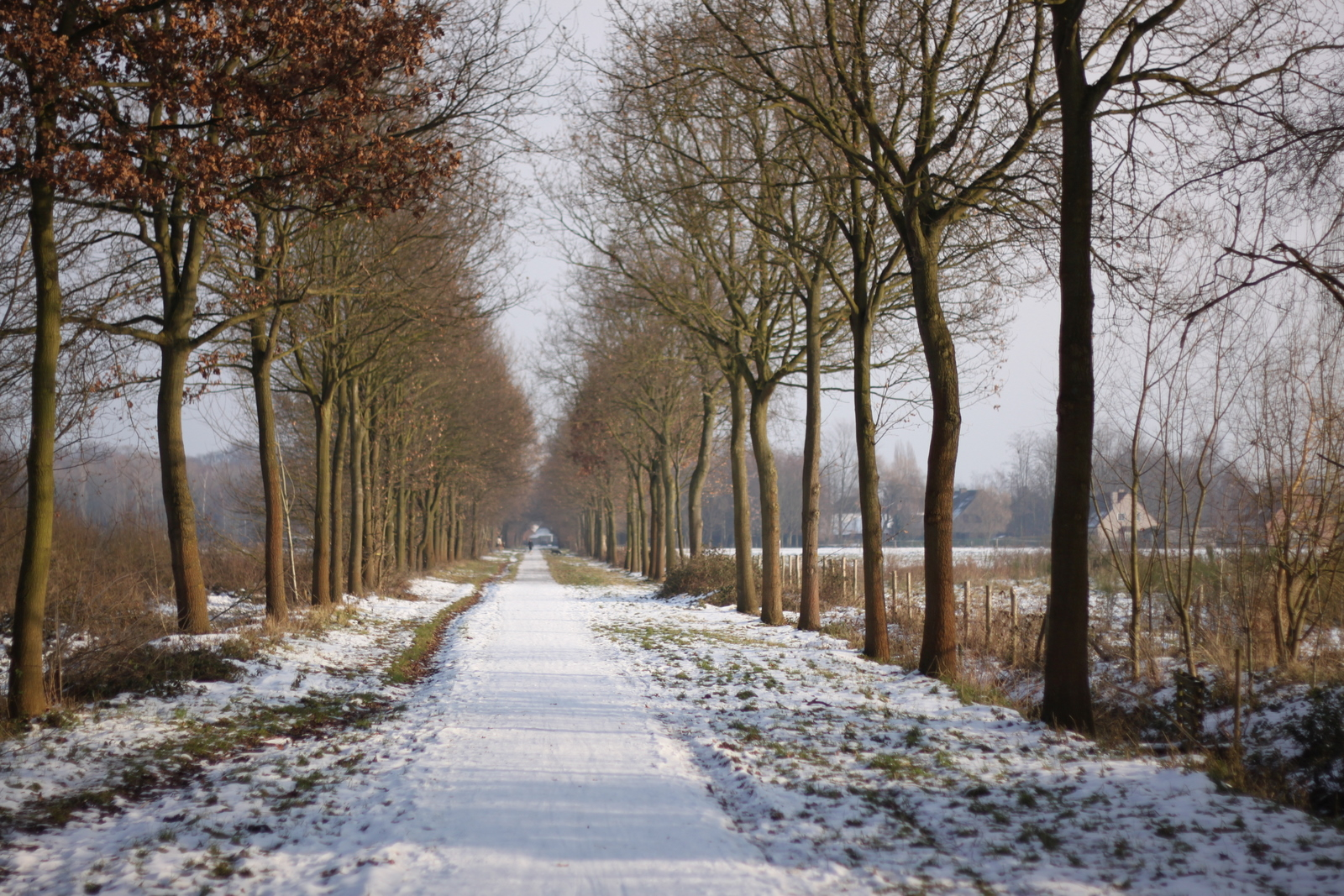

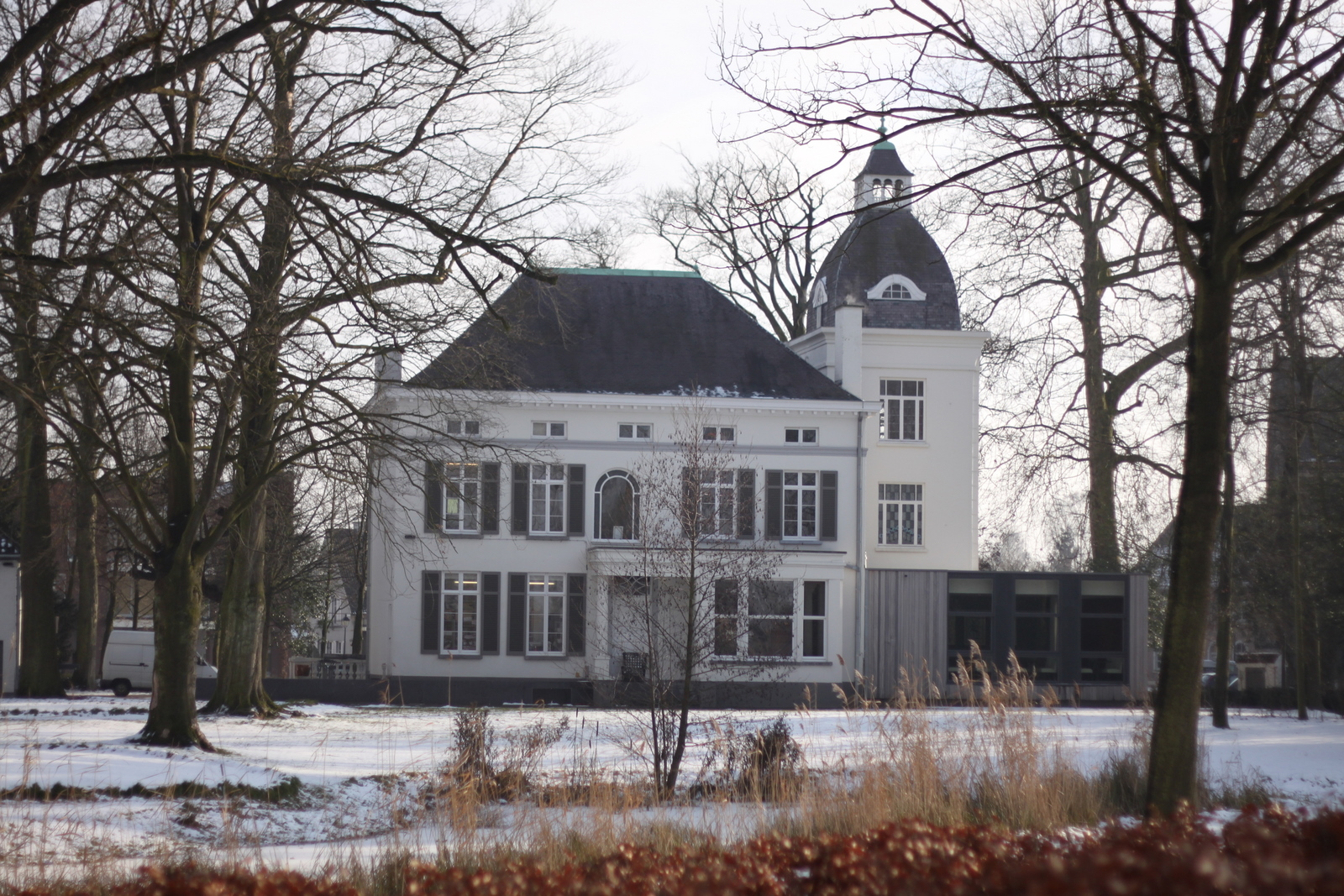
Viteux castle

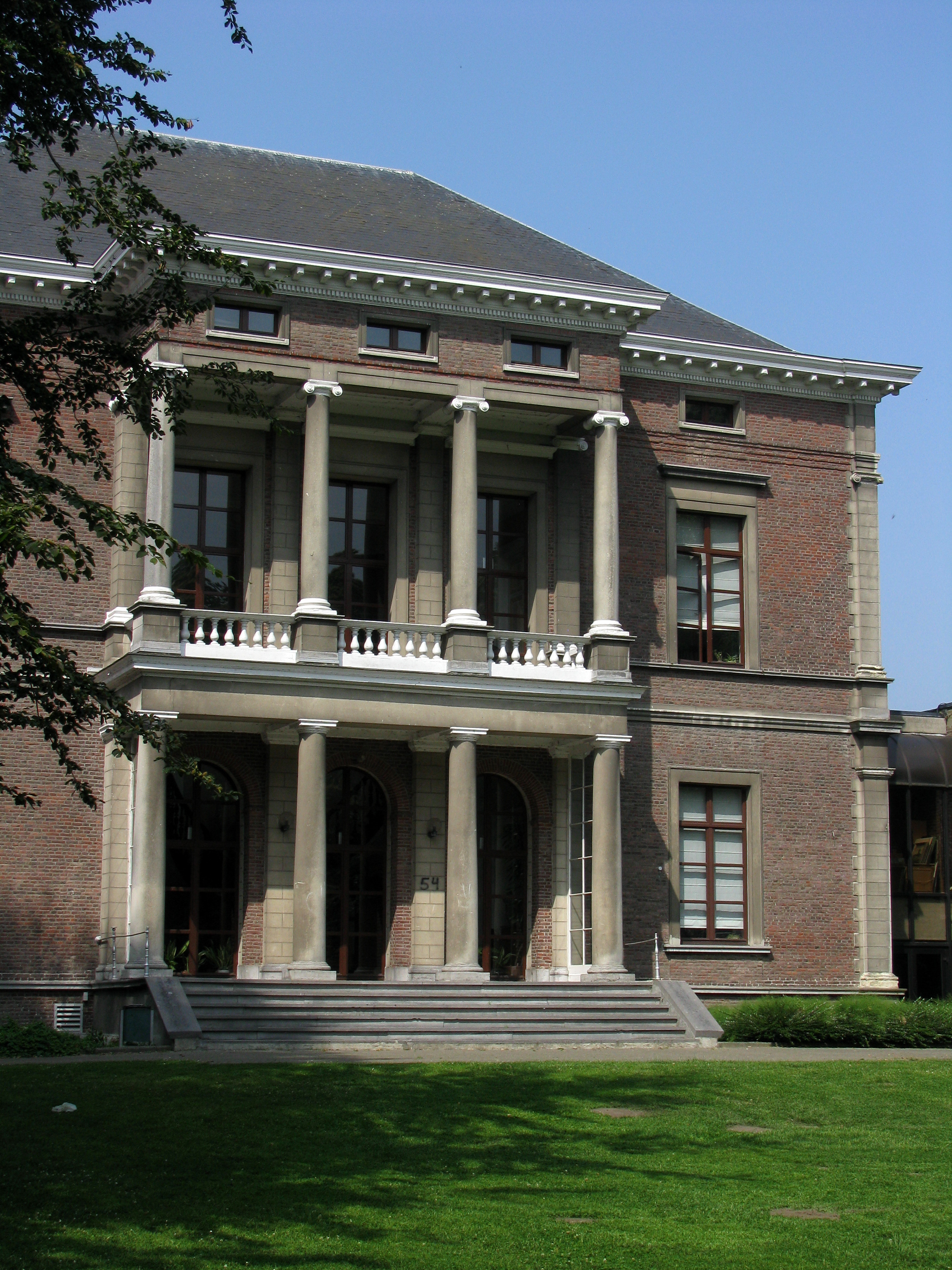
Scheldevelde castle

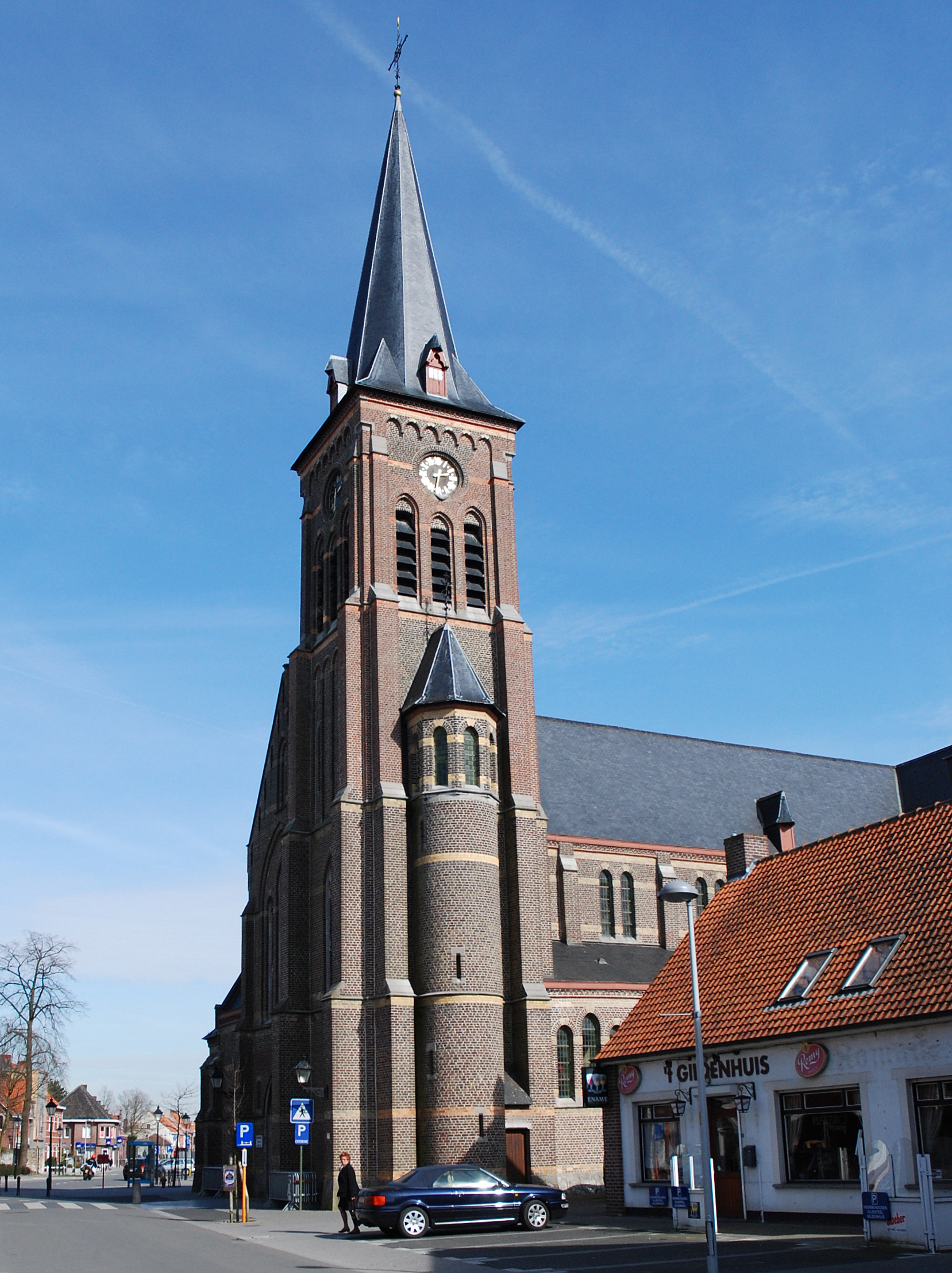
Sint-Niklaas van Tolentijnkerk
