= Melsen =

- Village
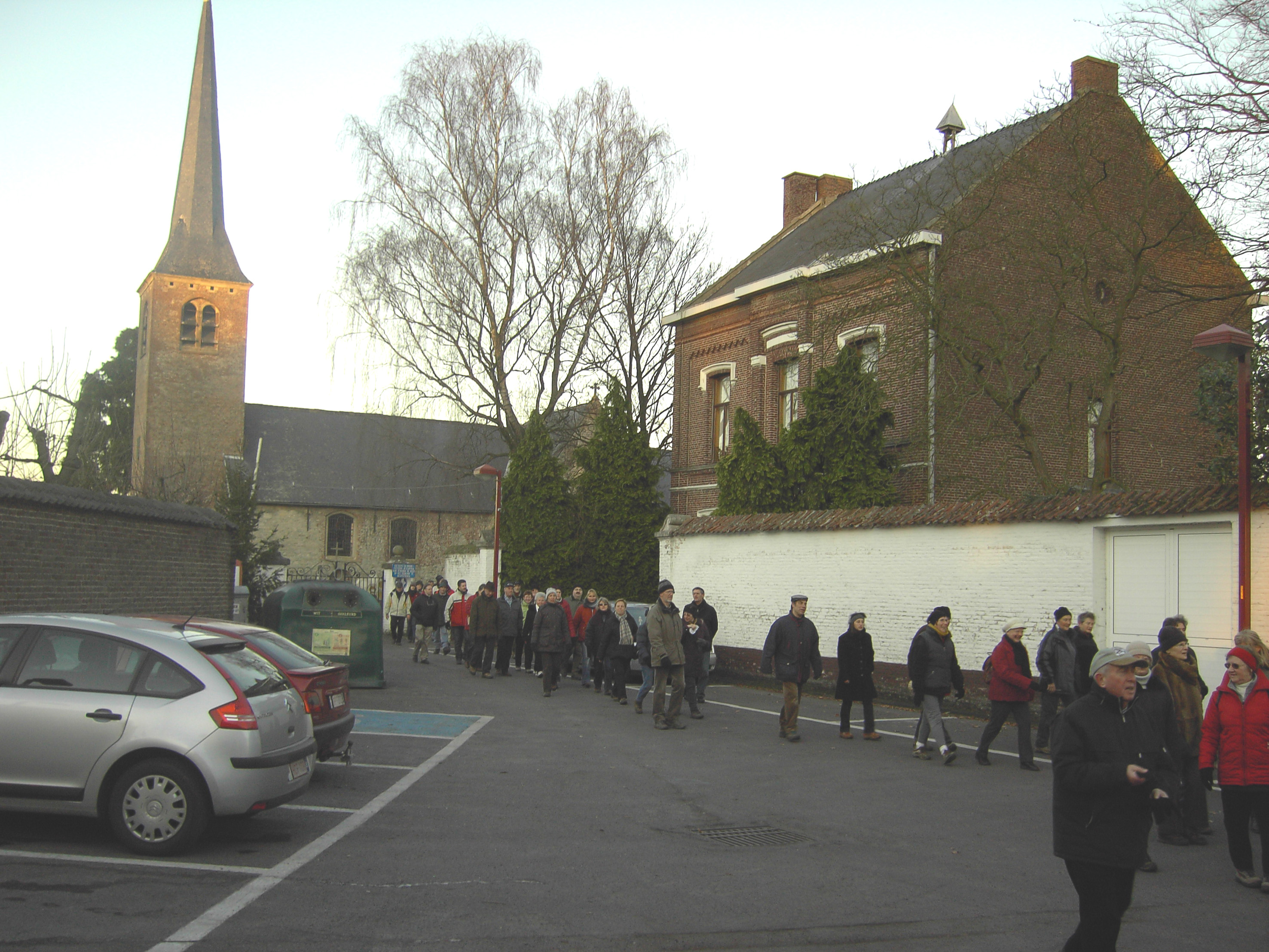
- Church of Melsen

- Location in Belgium
- Coordinates: 50°58′N 3°42′E
- Country: Belgium
- Province: East Flanders
- Municipality: Merelbeke

Area
  - Total: 3.82 km^{2} (1.47 sq mi)

Population (2021)
  - Total: 1,442
  - Density: 377/km^{2} (978/sq mi)
- Time zone: CET

Melsen is a village in the province of East Flanders, Belgium, and is a part of the municipality of Merelbeke. It covers an area of roughly 3 square kilometers. Its terrain is largely made up of one great hill. The northern and southern slopes of the hill, which are fairly steep for the surrounding area (about 20 meters), form the natural boundaries with the bordering villages of Vurste and Schelderode. The eastern slopes of the hill evolve into agricultural land and farther east into the forest of Makkegem. The western slope descends into a marsh that is connected to the Schelde (Scheldt) river.

Most of the land used to be for agricultural purposes, or covered with forests and marshes, but now most of the western and northern part of the village is almost fully covered by a network of streets and houses. Only some fields on the borders of the village remain.

== History ==
From the documents of the medieval abbey of Ename, it can be concluded that Melsen was in existence in the 9th century AD, and probably before that time as well. Its name, which roots back to proto-Germanic and could either mean 'pig stable' or 'marsh', seems to hint at an earlier origin, although there is no evidence to support this. There have also been archeological findings that have shown human presence in the area of the village dating back to Prehistory, but these were not permanent settlements.

Despite its long history, documents from the Middle Ages suggest that it has always been a small village without an important role. During the civil war that raged in the Low Countries in the 16th century, one of the feudal lords of Melsen, Filips III van der Gracht, was decapitated in Ghent along with others for his rebellion against the Spanish occupiers. His tombstone, although heavily eroded, can still be seen at the church of Melsen.

Incidentally, this church is probably one of the oldest buildings in the village, its foundations dating back to the 9th or 10th century, although most of its present-day form was built in the 17th century and rebuilt after World War II destroyed part of its walls and glass windows. Locally it is known for its long, slender and sharp bell tower. Although Melsen was ruled by aristocrats until 1977, not many of them have been buried at its cemetery. The 'castle' of Melsen is another old building in the village, dating back from the 16th or 17th century. Other houses or buildings in the village also date back 300 years or more.

Another famous building in the village is the 'Stone Mill'. In 1940, the retreating Belgian army put the mill on fire to prevent it from being used as a watchtower by the German occupiers, because geographically, the 'Stone Mill' was the highest architectural point in a circle of about 10 kilometers. The mill was never rebuilt and is still an impressive ruin, with only the bricks left (hence its current name). Although successive generations since World War II have claimed it could collapse at any time, it still hasn't happened. It is currently a big nesting place for birds.

In 1977, Melsen merged with Schelderode, Bottelare, Lemberge, Munte and Merelbeke to form the municipality of greater Merelbeke, although most original plans had provided for Melsen to become the centerpiece of this new town. Its old town hall is currently a bank office. In the mid and late nineties the village saw an explosive growth due to the influx of newcomers, making its population nowadays almost 2000 people.

== Language and dialect ==
The local dialect belongs to the group of central East-Flemish dialects but, like almost all dialects in this area, is strongly recessive because of its low prestige, greater mobility of people and the pervasive influence of both surrounding dialects, Standard Dutch and the so-called 'Verkavelingsvlaams', a mixture of Standard Dutch and Flemish sounds and words. The future of the dialect is uncertain.

The current form of the dialect contains over 16 vowels and 5 diphthongs and differs especially in this respect from Standard Dutch. Its consonant system is more like Standard Dutch, although some phonemes are missing entirely. Its vocabulary and grammar seem to be both a simplified and archaic version of many typical Dutch and Germanic root-words, with many French words intermixed. To German ears, it has been described as sounding a bit like Swedish, while speakers of English have sometimes interpreted it as a very deviant form of Scots. The dialect will usually be understood by most Flemings, except those in Limburg.

== Gallery ==
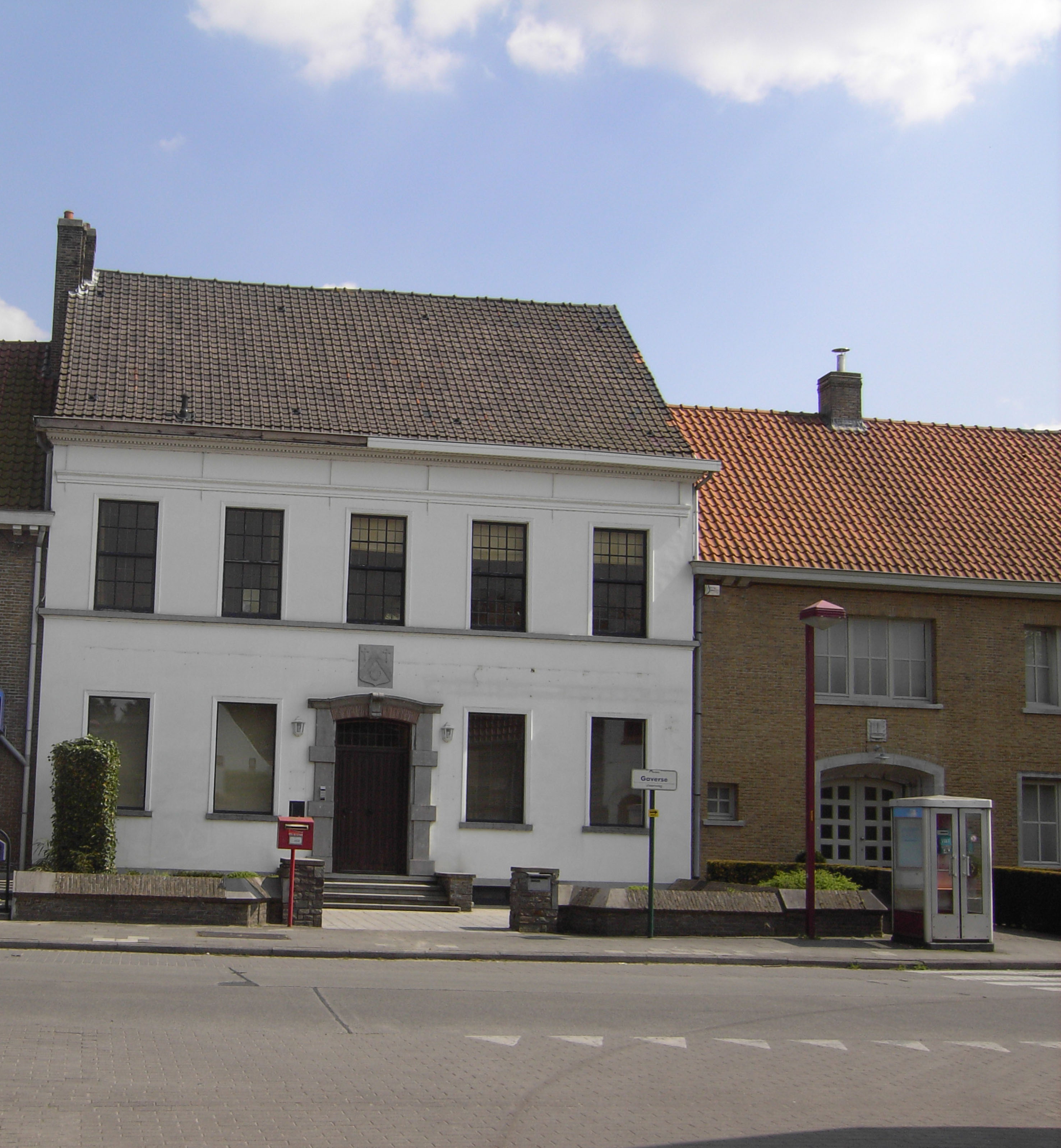
Former town hall

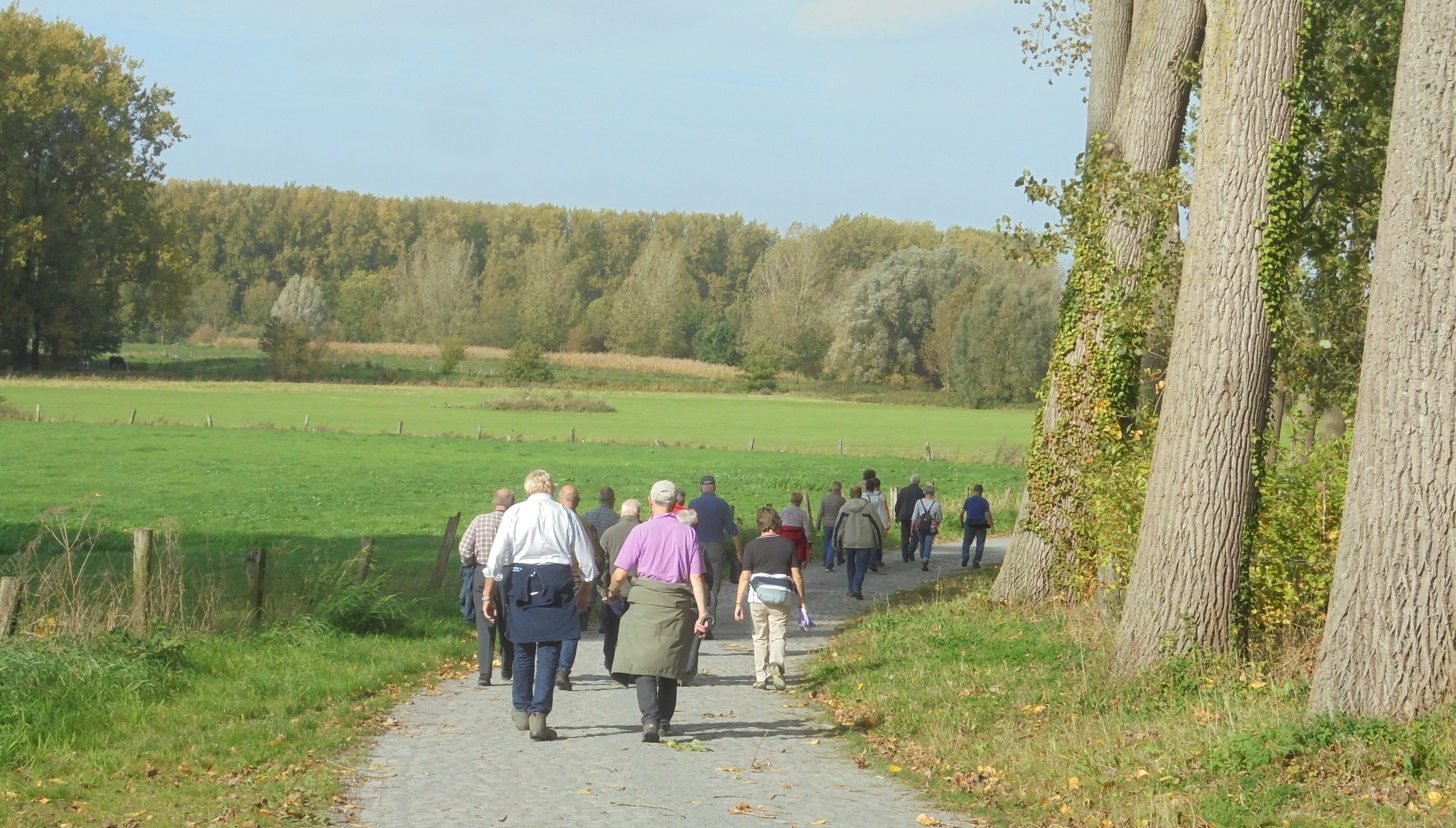
Scheldt valley

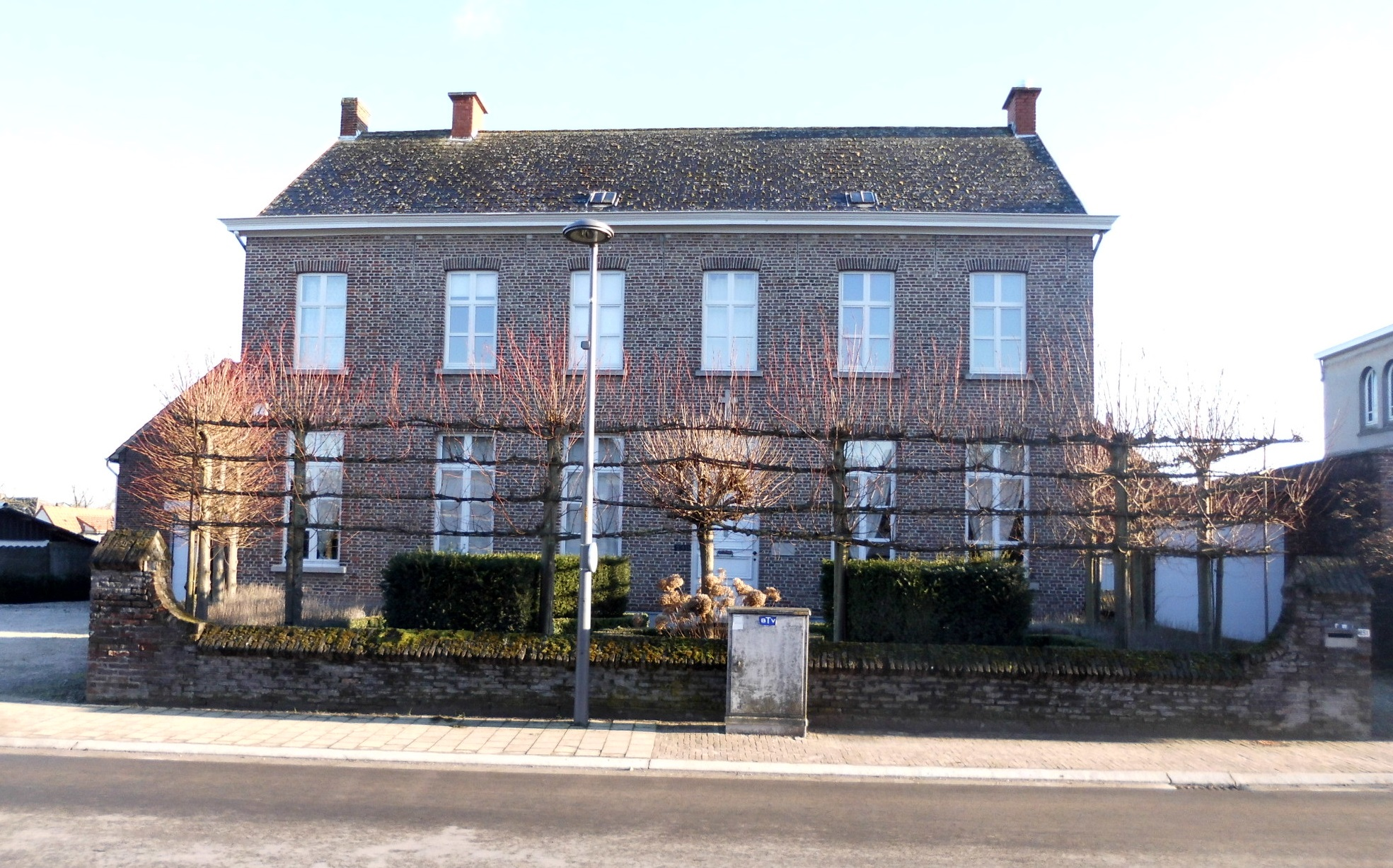
Former monastery

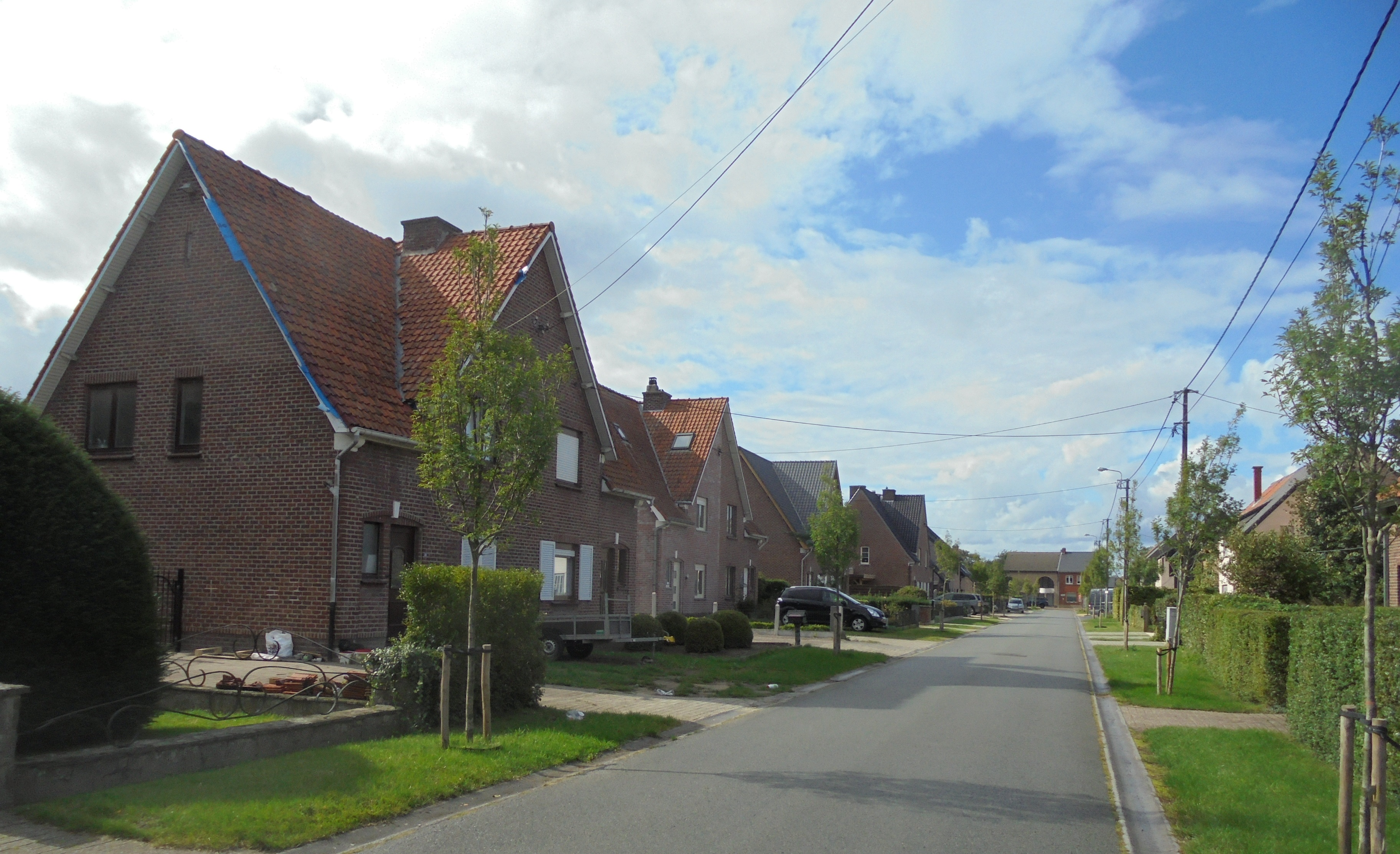
Street view
