= The Oh! =

Dance Project

- Origin: Belgium
- Genres: Eurodance
- Years active: 1999–2001
- Past members: DJ Pedroh; Phil Wilde

The Oh! was a short-lived Belgian dance project by DJ Pedroh and producer Phil Wilde. It now exists in Ostend.

== Musical career ==
To promote the dance club The Oh! in Gavere (Belgium) resident DJ and owner Pedroh went into the studio with producer Phil Wilde in 1999. Together they released the club hit “Won’t You Show Me The Way”. The song was written by Xavier Clayton who has written songs for dance artists such as 2 Unlimited, David Guetta and Zippora. Just before the summer of 1999 “Won’t You Show Me The Way” entered the mainstream. The vocals were performed by singer Zippora while Edwige Veermeer, a former dancer in the group Timeshift and singer of a group called Candy, was the face and dancer of the group. Edwige sang the hits following to "Won't You Show Me The Way".

After the success in the clubs “Won’t You Show Me The Way” was released as cd-single. Their Belgian breakthrough came a few months later with the next single “Got To Be Free” who climbed to number 6 in the Ultratop, selling more than 16.000 copies. Three more singles were released, but in 2002 Edwige Veermeer decided to go solo under the name Ceejay and released the single "Time, Now’s The Time”.

== Discography ==
=== Singles ===
Year	Single	Peak chart positions
Year	Single	BEL (VL)
1999	"Won't You Show Me the Way"	29
1999	"Got to Be Free"	6
2000	"I'm on My Way"	28
2000	"Forever in My Life"	49
2001	"Eternity"	—
"—" denotes releases that did not chart
