= Zevergem =

- Village
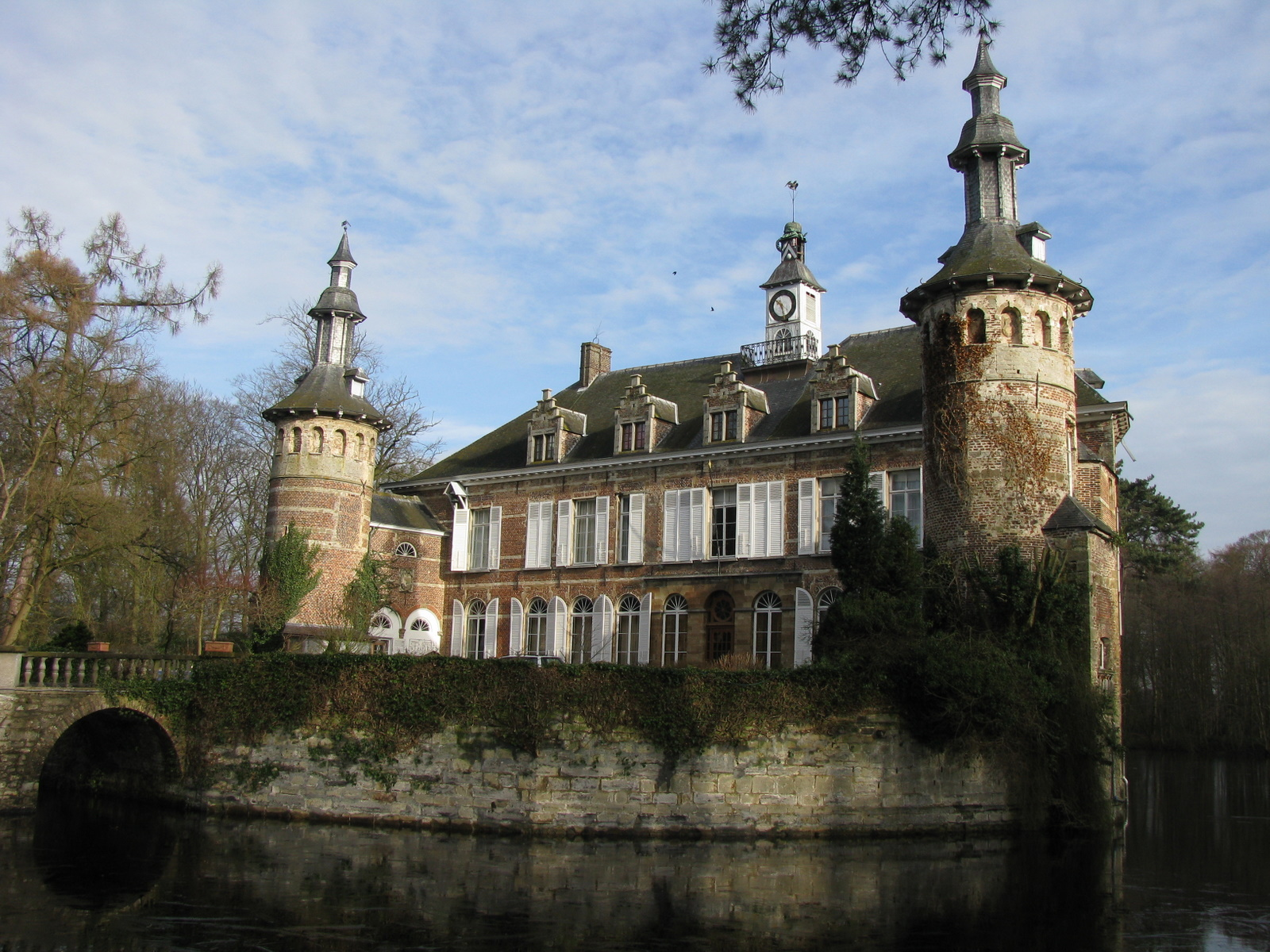
- Welden Castle

- Location in Belgium
- Coordinates: 50.9790°N 3.6933°E
- Country: Belgium
- Region: Flemish Region
- Province: East Flanders
- Municipality: Ghent

Area
  - Total: 8.77 km^{2} (3.39 sq mi)

Population (2021)
  - Total: 1,763
  - Density: 201/km^{2} (521/sq mi)
- Time zone: CET

Zevergem is a village and deelgemeente (sub-municipality) of De Pinte in East Flanders, Belgium. It is located on the Scheldt about 8 kilometres (5.0 mi) south of Ghent.

== History ==
The village was first mentioned in 964 as Sewaringhem, and means "settlement of the people of Saiwirwar (person)". The village is located between the Scheldt and the edge of the heath areas. Zevergem was part of a heerlijkheid (landed estate), but the countryside belonged to the more important Lords of Welden who owned a castle near the area. The village heerlijkheid was awarded to the Saint Peter's Abbey in Ghent in 1232. In 1716, Welden was elevated to barony. Zevergem was an independent municipality until 1977 when it was merged into De Pinte.

== Buildings and sights ==
Welden Castle was originally known as Hof te Seevergem. Only the castle walls and one tower remain of the medieval castle. The current water castle with double moat and walls was built around 1700 in late Baroque style. The castle was restored in 1927. In 1933, a gate house in Rococo style was moved from Hotel de Hemptinne to the castle grounds.

The Our Lady Church is a single aisled church to the east of the village square. The lower part of the tower contains 12th century elements. The church was extended and modified in 1768, and between 1852 and 1855. During World War I, the tower was blown up and the church was severely damaged. It was restored in 1922.

== Notable people ==
- Lucien Mathys (1924–2010), racing cyclist

== Gallery ==
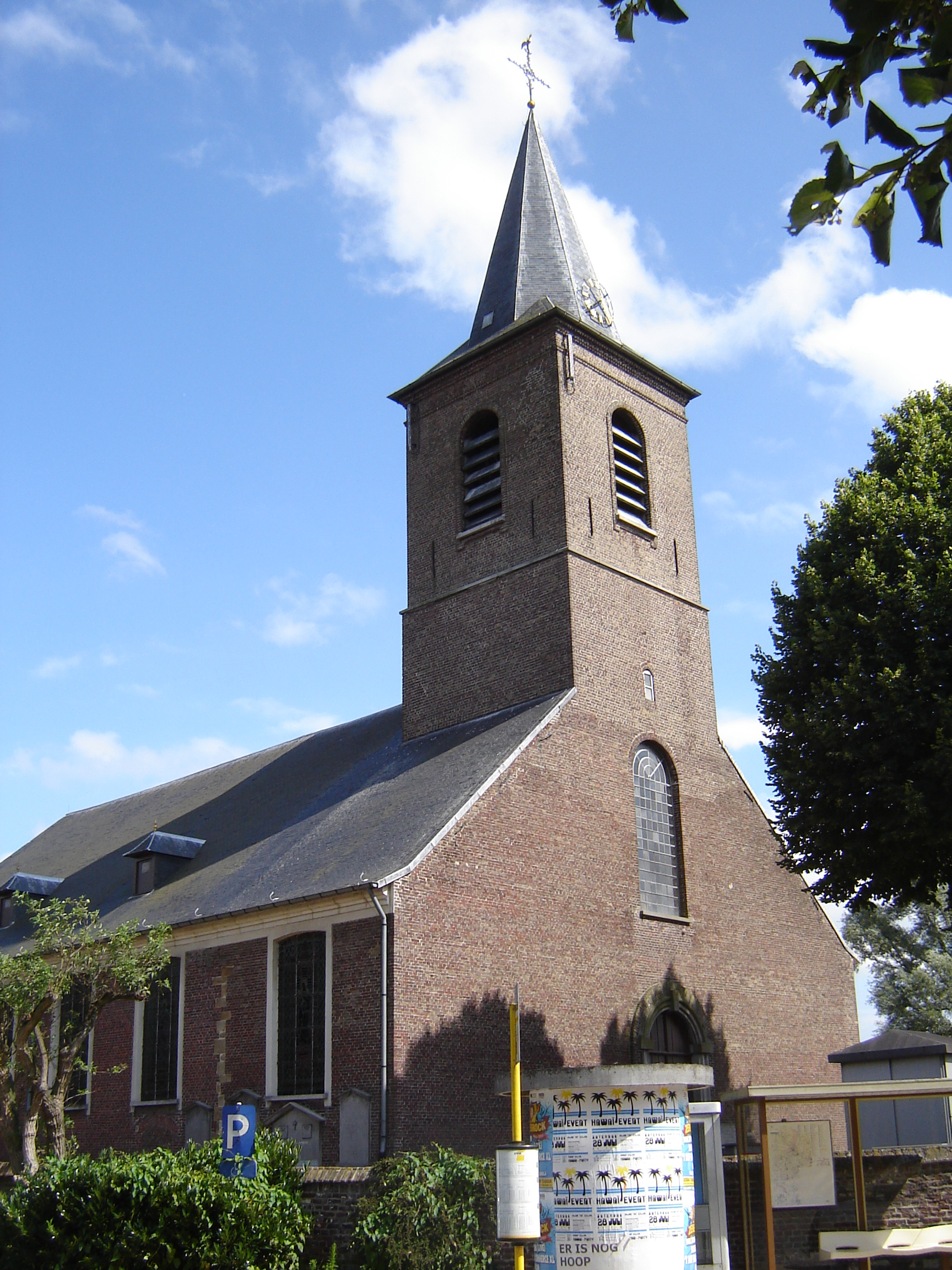
Our Lady Church

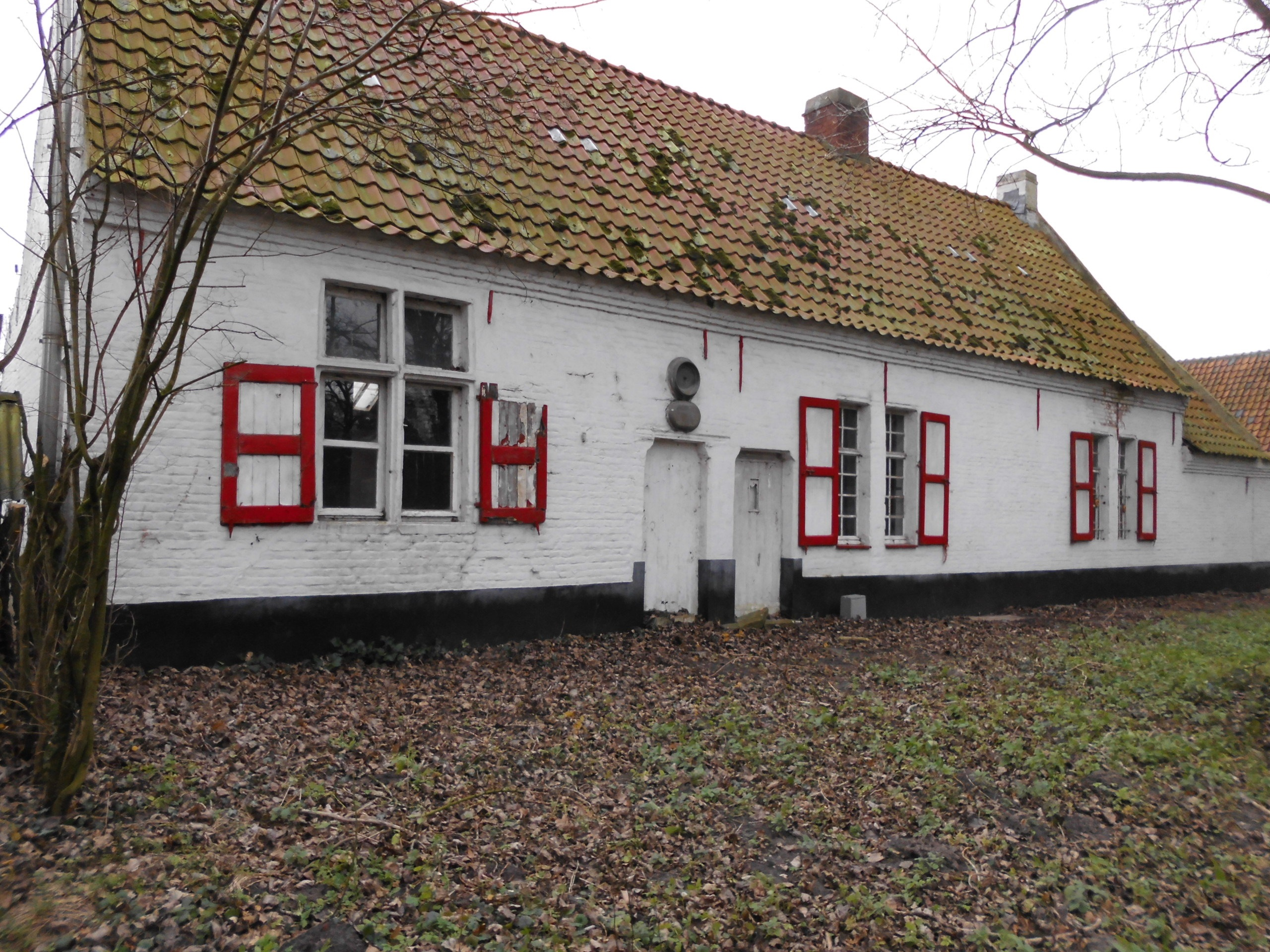
Vierschaar (former court of law)

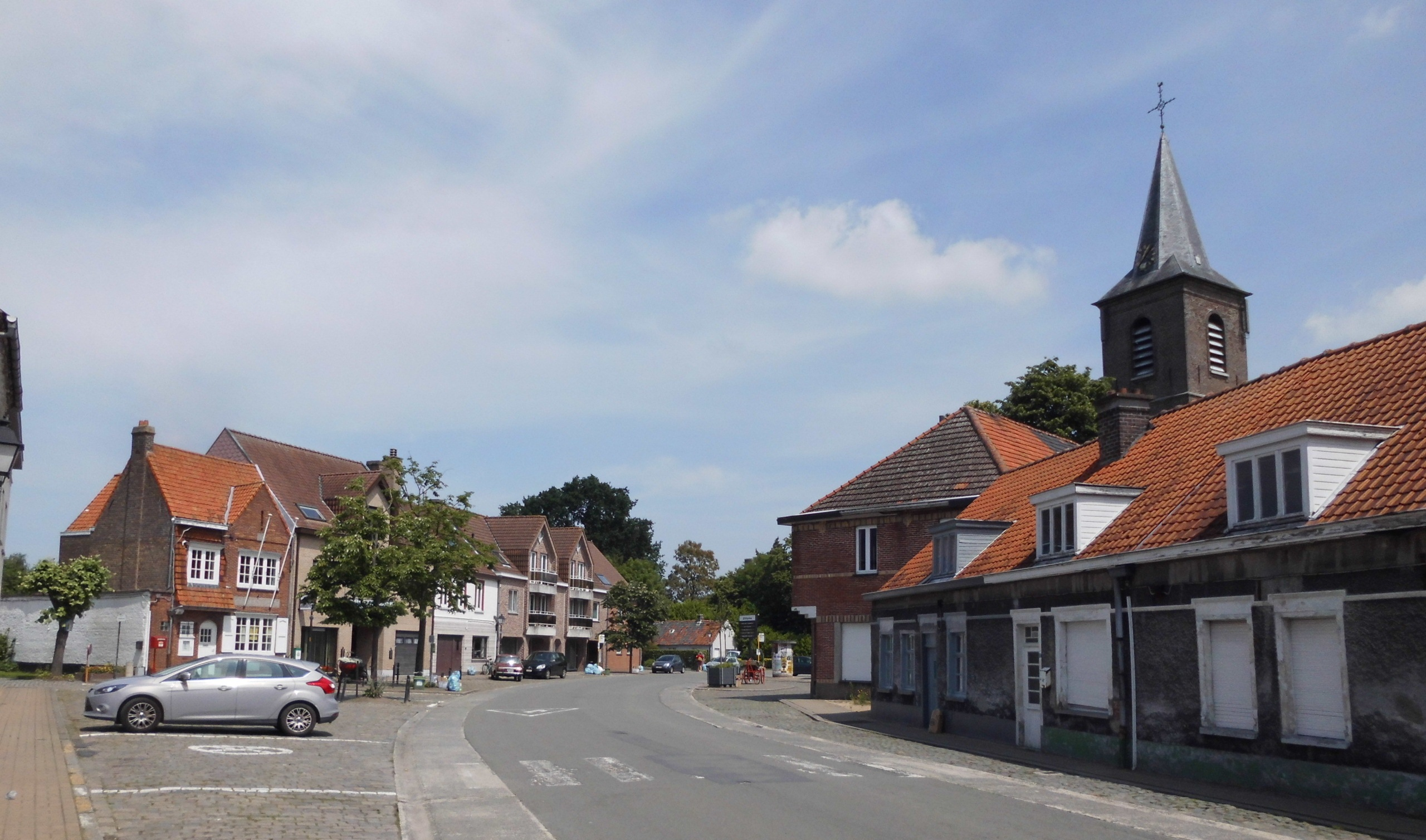
Centre of Zevergem

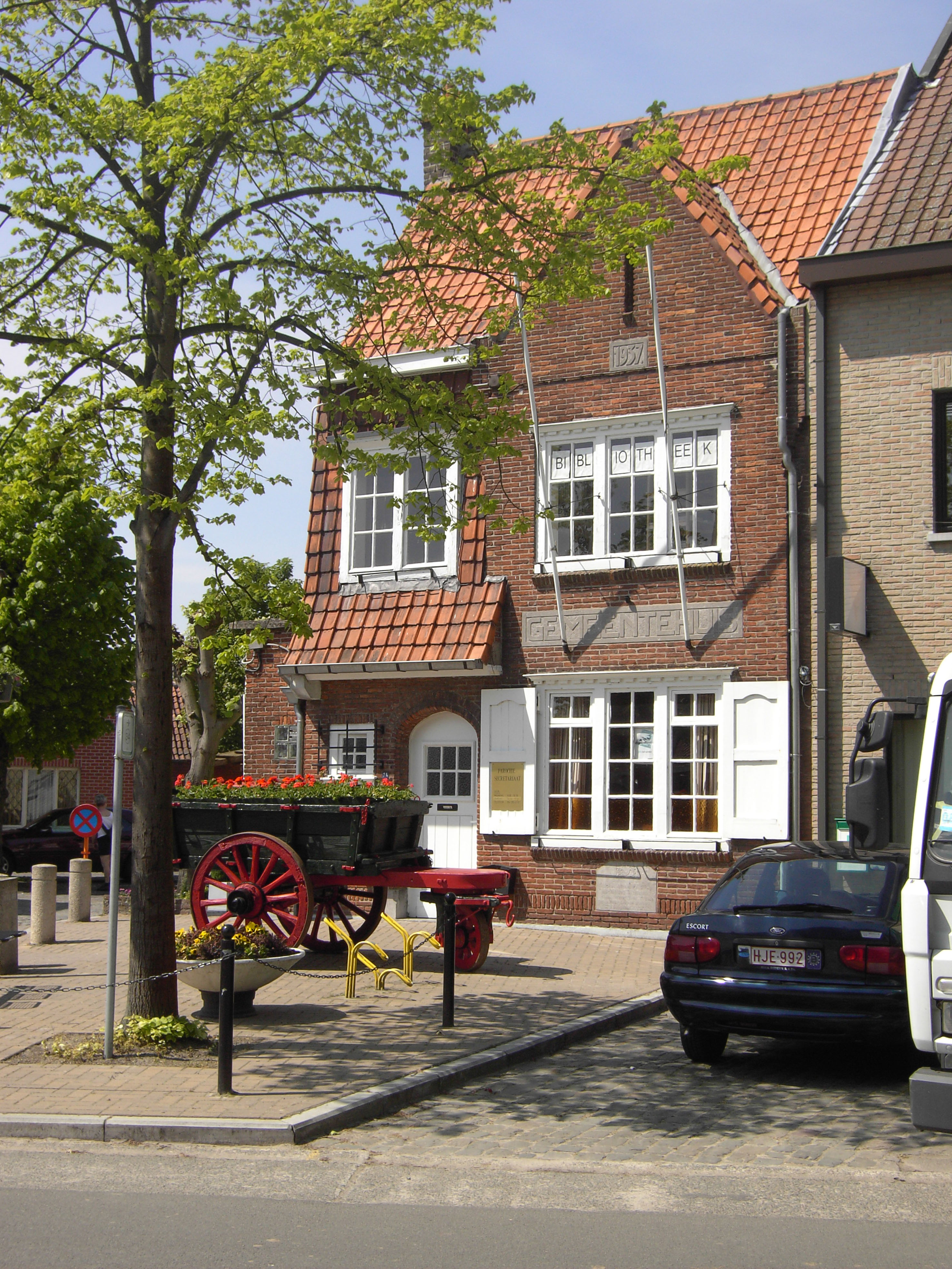
Former town hall
