= Baaigem =

- Village
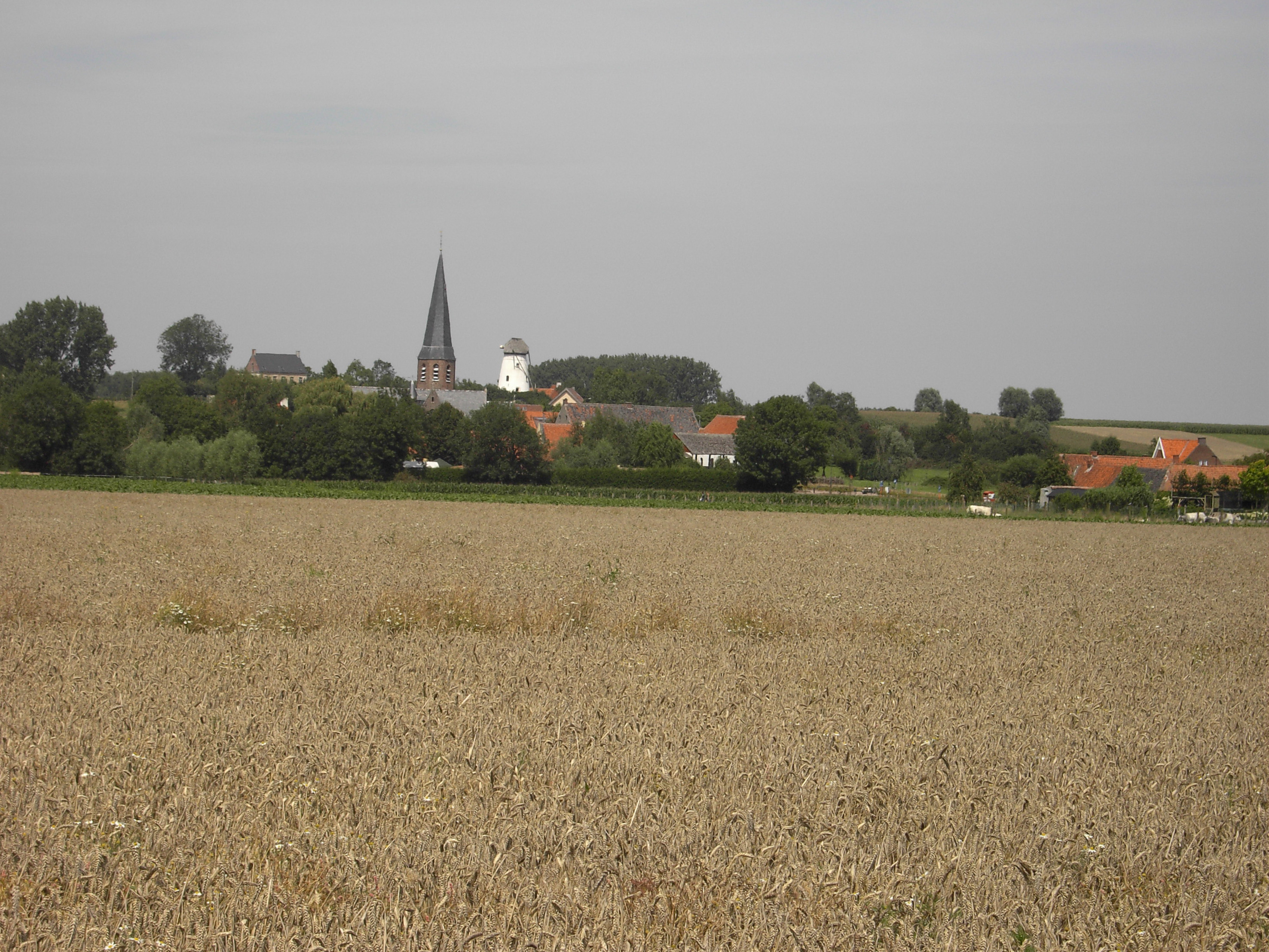
- View on Baaigem

- Location in Belgium
- Coordinates: 50°55′59″N 3°43′5″E
- Country: Belgium
- Province: East Flanders
- Municipality: Gavere

Area
  - Total: 3.82 km^{2} (1.47 sq mi)

Population (2021)
  - Total: 598
  - Density: 157/km^{2} (405/sq mi)
- Postal code: 9890
- Website: www.gavere.be

Baaigem is one of the six villages belonging to the municipality Gavere. It is located on the edge of the Flemish Ardennes, the hilly southern part of the province of East Flanders, Belgium, and used to be an independent municipality till the end of 1976.

Baaigem is 3.79 square kilometer large, and had 565 inhabitants on 31 December 2005. Its population is the smallest among the six villages of Gavere.

== Places of interest ==
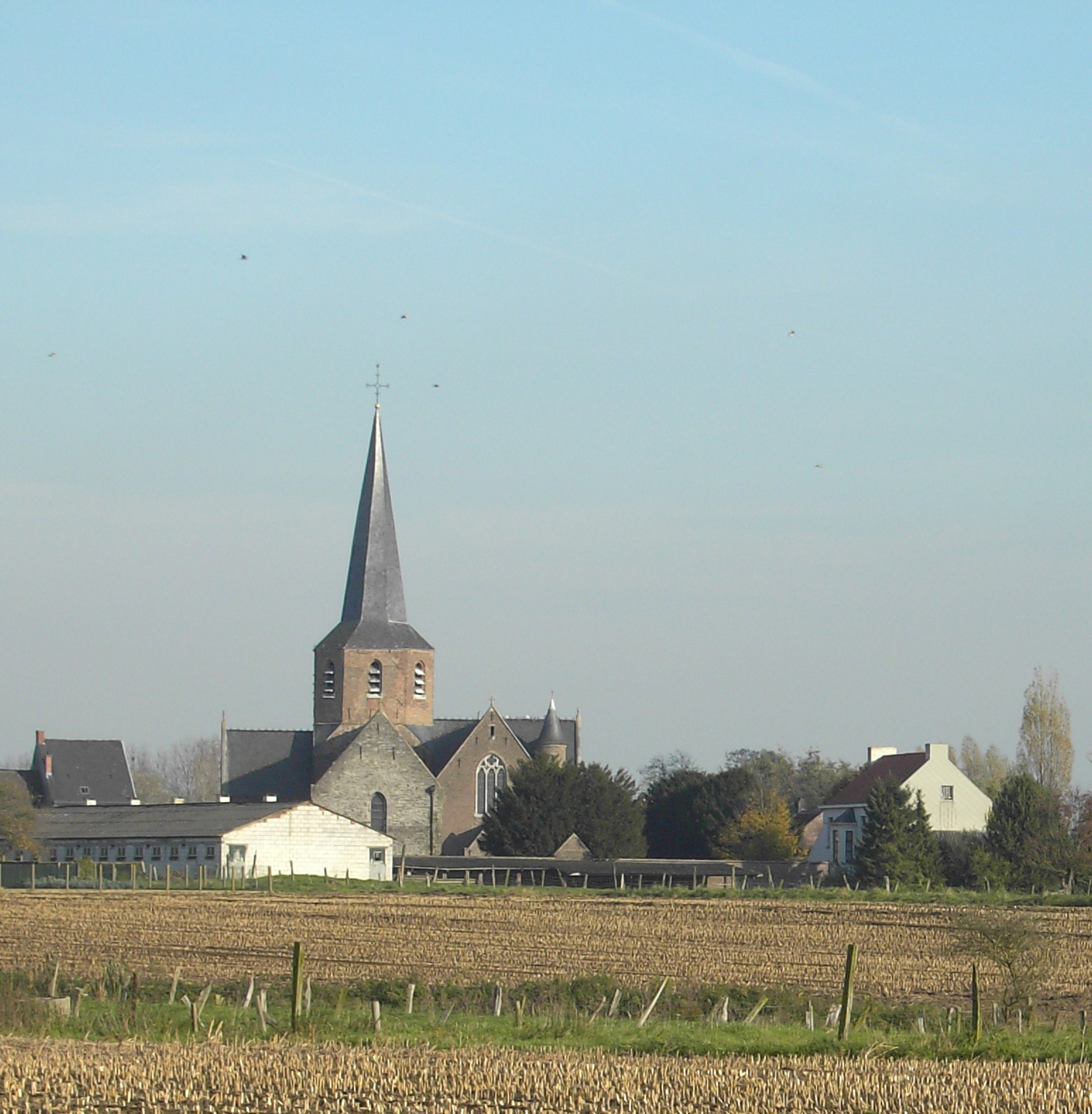
Saint-Bavo Church of Baaigem (2007)

First record about the Saint-Bavo Church of Baaigem dates back to 1096. In that year, the Bishop of Cambrai (Kamerijk) allocated the patronage of the church to the Saint-Peters Abbey of Dikkelvenne, which moved then to the City of Geraardsbergen to become the Saint-Adrian Abbey. In 1147 the patronage was transferred to the Abbey of Anchin in northern France.

The original church building had one nave and was made out of Tournai limestone. In the latter half of the 13th century, the nave was enlarged by 6 meters and at the west side of the church a new front arose. A Gothic style choir was added around 1300, using large blocks of Balegem sandstone, a brick octagonal crossing tower around 1450, and a northern transept just before the religious troubles of the 16th century.

In 1913, architect Geirnaert realised the construction of a second, Neo-Gothic building at the south side of the existing church. In 1988, the church underwent restoration.

The Government of Belgium assigned the oldest part of the Baaigem church as an important cultural asset on 15 December 1942.

Opposite the church, an impressive farm estate is located, called "Hof ter Walle" (also "Hof te Baaigem"). It dates back to 1645, and originally belonged to the Count of Flanders. It later moved into the hands of Capittel of the Cambrai Cathedral and the Abbey of Anchin (both located in nowadays northern France). The Government of Flanders assigned it to the list of cultural heritage on 20 July 1982.

== Demographic evolution ==
- Source: National Institute for Statistics (NIS) of Belgium; Remark: from 1806 till 1970=census; 1976, 2005=inhabitants on 31 December
