= Merelbeke =

- Municipality
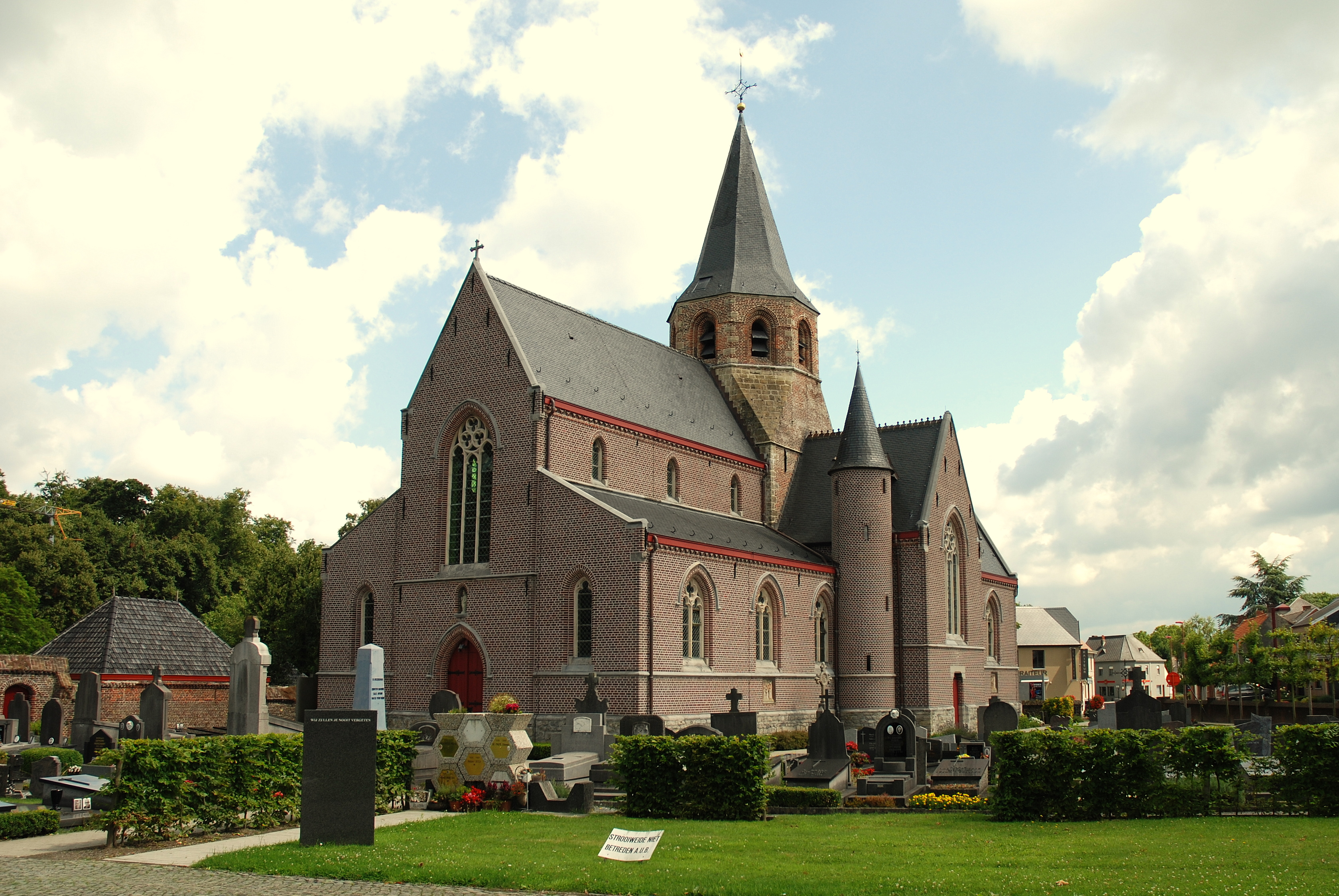
- Church of Schelderode (2009)

- Flag Coat of arms

- Location of Merelbeke in East Flanders
- Interactive map of Merelbeke
- Location in Belgium
- Coordinates: 51°00′N 03°45′E
- Country: Belgium
- Community: Flemish Community
- Region: Flemish Region
- Province: East Flanders
- Arrondissement: Ghent

Government
  - Mayor: Filip Thienpont (CD&V)
  - Governing parties: Open Vld, CD&V

Population (2018-01-01)
  - Total: 24,634
- Postal codes: 9820
- NIS code: 44043
- Area codes: 09
- Website: www.merelbeke.be

Merelbeke (Dutch pronunciation: [ˈmeːrəlˌbeːkə]) is a former municipality located in the Flemish province of East Flanders, in Belgium. The municipality comprises the villages of Bottelare, Lemberge, Melsen, Merelbeke proper, Munte and Schelderode. In 2021, Merelbeke had a total population of 24,779. The total area is 36.65 km^{2}.
