= Bottelare =

- Village
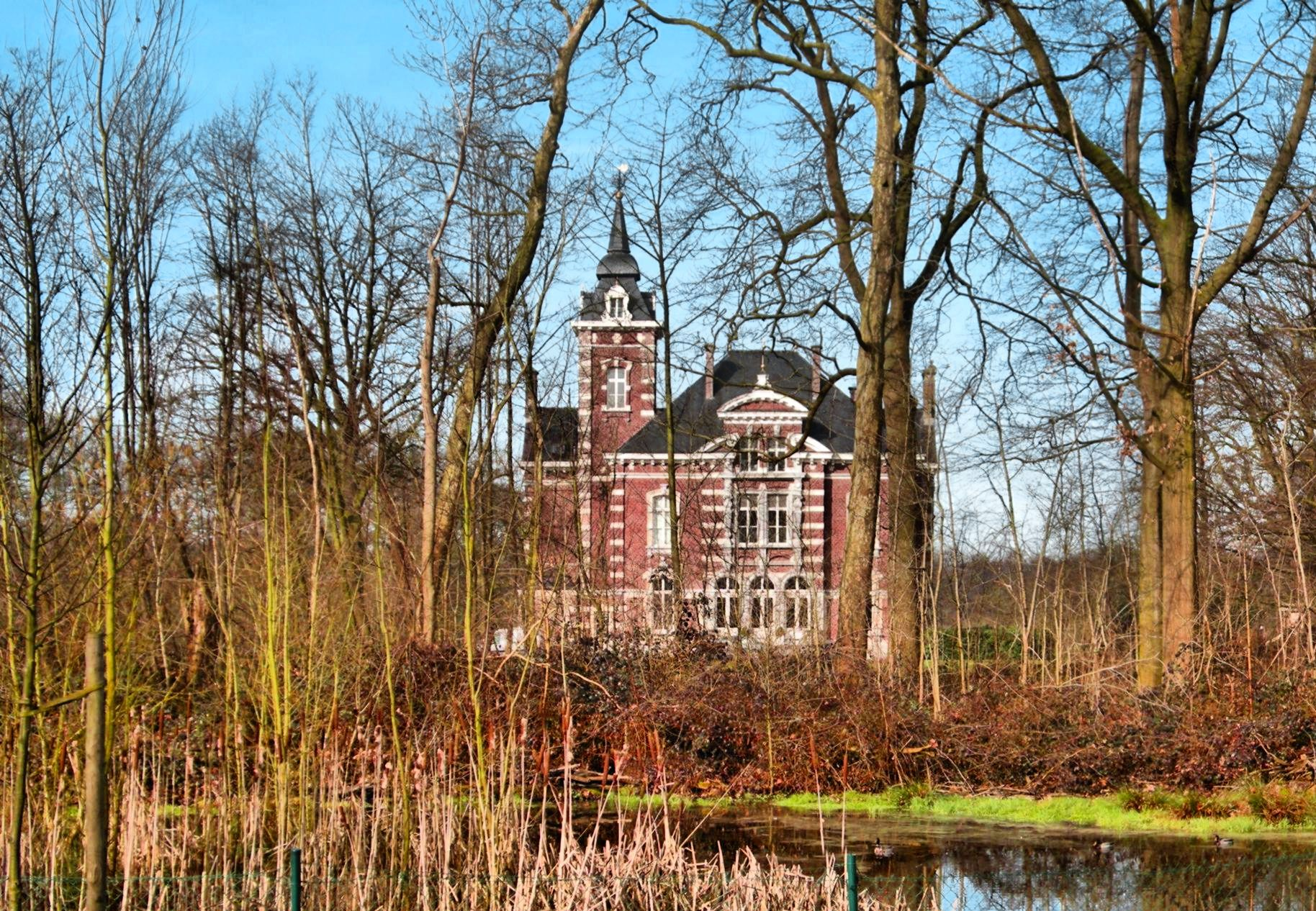
- Castle of Bottelare

- Coat of arms

- Location in Belgium
- Coordinates: 50°58′N 3°45′E
- Country: Belgium
- Province: East Flanders
- Municipality: Merelbeke

Area
  - Total: 3.01 km^{2} (1.16 sq mi)

Population (2021)
  - Total: 1,860
  - Density: 618/km^{2} (1,600/sq mi)
- Time zone: CET

Bottelare is a village in the province of East Flanders, Belgium, at the edge of the Flemish Ardennes. It is now part of the municipality of Merelbeke.

During the 17th century, Bottelare became a famous pilgrimage place, dedicated to Saint Anne. Its gorgeous hall church, a large statue of Saint Anne and the Saint Anne Chapel in the village centre are witnesses of this.

== Places of interest ==
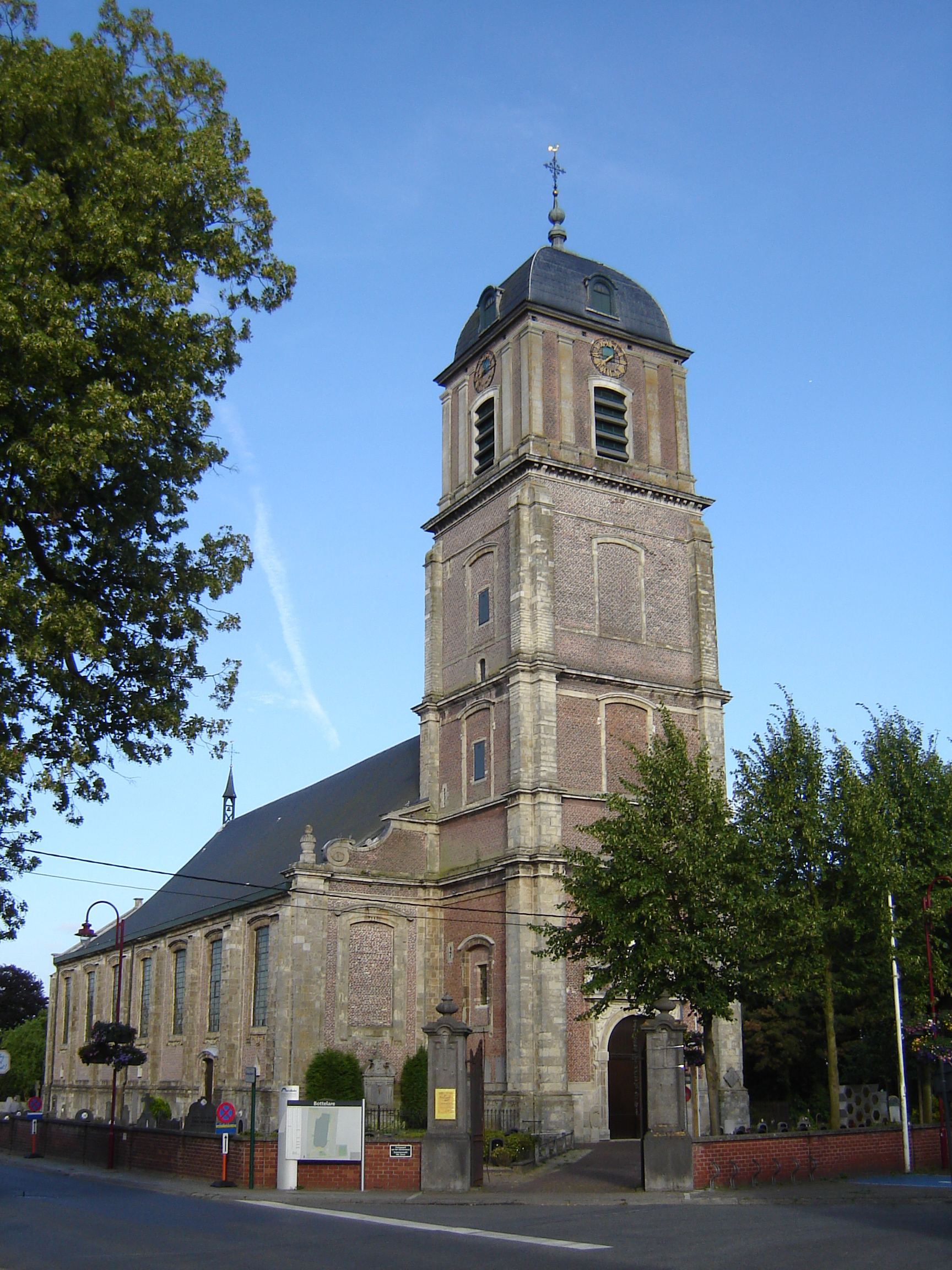
Church of Bottelare (2007)

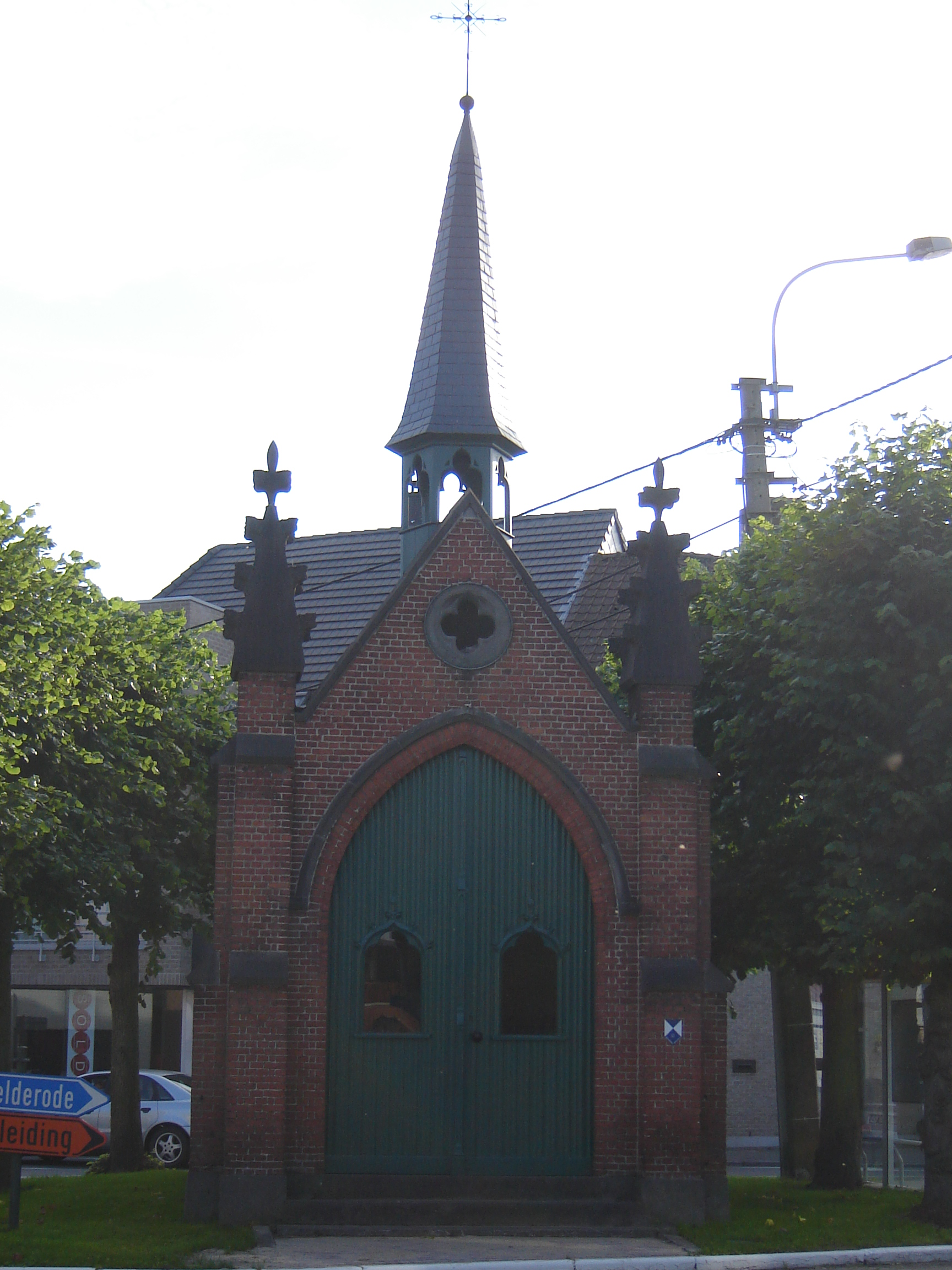
Saint Anne Chapel of Bottelare (2007)
