= Vurste =

- Village
- Interactive map of Vurste
- Coordinates: 50°56′42″N 3°41′02″E
- Country: Belgium
- Region: Flanders
- Province: East Flanders
- Municipality: Gavere

Area
  - Total: 3.78 km^{2} (1.46 sq mi)

Population (2025-01-01)
  - Total: 1,031
  - Density: 273/km^{2} (706/sq mi)
- Postal code: 9890

Vurste is a village in the province of East Flanders, Belgium, and a sub-municipality of Gavere. It was an independent municipality until the municipal merger of 1977.

== History ==
Vurste was first mentioned in 1110 under the name Vorste, which is believed to derive from the Latin forestum, meaning "forest".

In 1284, properties in Vurste came into the possession of the Saint Peter's Abbey in Ghent. Administratively, the village belonged to the Land of Aalst.

Vurste remained an independent municipality until 31 December 1976, after which it became part of Gavere on 1 January 1977.

== Geography ==
Vurste is located along the Scheldt river, in a transition zone between sandy and sandy-loam regions of Flanders.
