= Gavere =

- Municipality
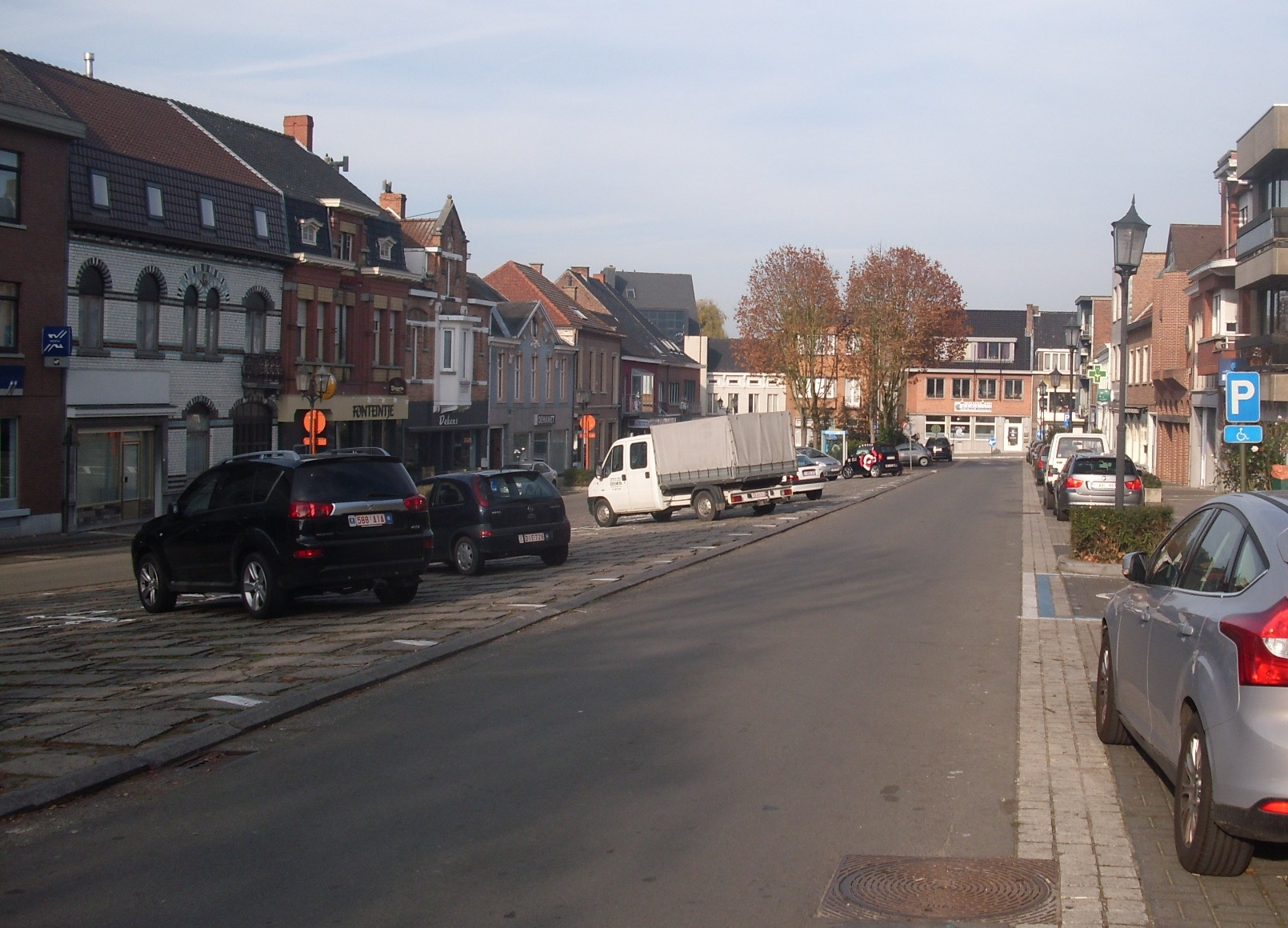

- Flag Coat of arms

- Location of Gavere in East Flanders
- Interactive map of Gavere
- Location in Belgium
- Coordinates: 50°56′N 03°40′E
- Country: Belgium
- Community: Flemish Community
- Region: Flemish Region
- Province: East Flanders
- Arrondissement: Ghent

Government
  - Mayor: Denis Dierickx (Open VLD-VOG)
  - Governing parties: Open Vld-VOG, Vooruit

Area
  - Total: 31.6 km^{2} (12.2 sq mi)

Population (2018-01-01)
  - Total: 12,769
  - Density: 404/km^{2} (1,050/sq mi)
- Postal codes: 9890
- NIS code: 44020
- Area codes: 09
- Website: www.gavere.be

Gavere (Dutch pronunciation: [ˈɣaːvərə]) is a municipality located in the Belgian province of East Flanders. The municipality comprises the towns of Asper, Baaigem, Dikkelvenne, Gavere, Semmerzake and Vurste. In 2021, Gavere had a total population of 13,007. The total area is 31.35 km^{2}.

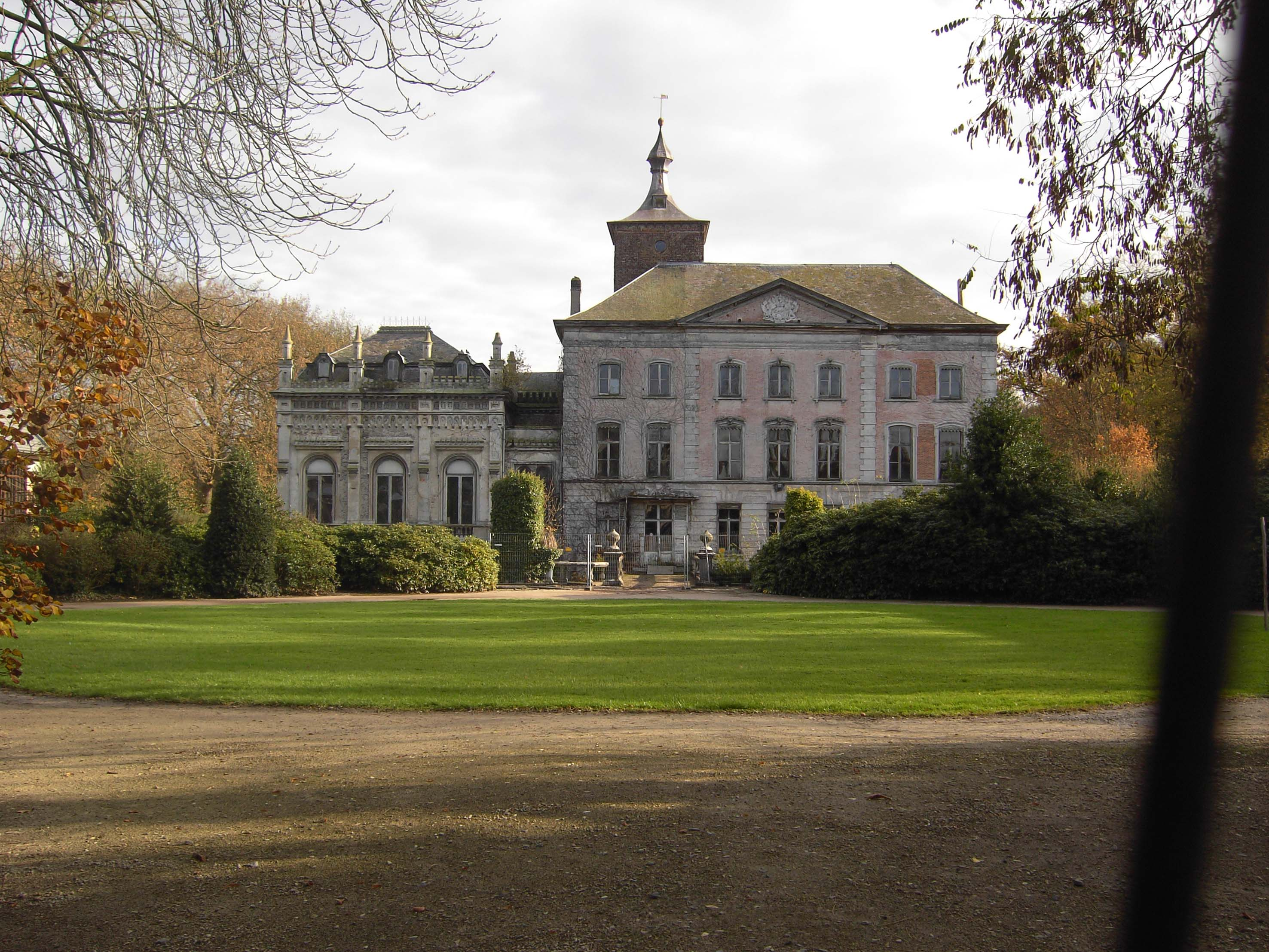
Borgwal Castle in Vurste (2007)

== Sports ==
The Cyclo-cross Gavere is a notable cyclo-cross race held in Gavere in the vicinity of the Grenier castle. The race has been part of the Superprestige as well as UCI Cyclo-cross World Cup.

== Military ==
The Air Traffic Control center of the Belgian Air Component was based in Semmerzake.

== See also ==
- Lamoraal van Egmont, Prince of Gavere
