= Schelderode =

- Village
- Interactive map of Schelderode
- Coordinates: 50°57′N 3°45′E
- Country: Belgium
- Region: Flanders
- Province: East Flanders
- Municipality: Merelbeke-Melle

Area
  - Total: 5.55 km^{2} (2.14 sq mi)

Population (1981)
  - Total: 1,307
  - Density: 236/km^{2} (610/sq mi)
- Postal code: 9820

Schelderode is a village in the Flemish Region of Belgium, located in the province of East Flanders. It is a submunicipality of Merelbeke-Melle.

== History ==
The oldest mention of Schelderode dates from 866 as Rodus, later appearing as Rotha in 1002, derived from the Germanic Ropa, meaning cleared forest. The prefix "Schelde" was later added to distinguish it from nearby Gontrode. Schelderode was the centre of the Land of Rode within the County of Aalst, where the lords of Rode held their residence and domains. From the 12th century onwards, the lineage of the lords of Rode is documented, and their possessions expanded significantly in 1227 to include multiple parishes.

The Land of Rode became a barony in 1565 and was elevated to a marquisate in 1682. Ownership passed through several noble families, including those of Kortrijk, Kassel, Bar, Luxemburg, and Bourbon. In 1602, Henry IV of France sold the domain to Simon Rodriguez d'Evora, an Antwerp merchant of Portuguese origin. Schelderode also contained several smaller lordships and feudal holdings.

The parish church, dedicated to Saint Martin, was first mentioned in 1108 and belonged to the Saint Peter's Abbey in Ghent. The original castle of the lords of Rode had disappeared by the 17th century, but a new castle, known as the Kasteel van Schelderode, was built in 1865 by F. Van de Poele and remains a prominent feature in the village.

== Geography ==
Schelderode is a rural village situated along the Upper Scheldt in sandy Flanders, covering approximately 555 hectares. The northern part lies within the alluvial Scheldt valley, characterized by flat wetlands at an elevation of 7 to 8 metres, including water bodies formed by peat and clay extraction. A steep slope separates this valley from the higher, gently undulating terrain inland, where elevations range between 20 and 25 metres, rising to 44 metres in the south.

Large parts of the Scheldt meadows have been protected as a landscape area since 1981. The village is also historically wooded, with remaining forest areas such as Nerenbos, Bruinbos, and Harentbeekbos.

== Landmarks ==
Important landmarks include the Saint Martin's Church and the Kasteel van Schelderode, surrounded by a park that significantly shapes the village centre. The historic layout of the village is centred along the Gaversesteenweg, connecting the northern part of the municipality with the village core.

== Economy and infrastructure ==
Schelderode has traditionally been an agricultural community. In recent decades, however, its residential function has increased due to the subdivision of former agricultural land, while farming activity has declined. The village retains a rural character with dispersed settlement patterns.
