= Luc Reychler =

Belgian social and political scientist (born 1944)

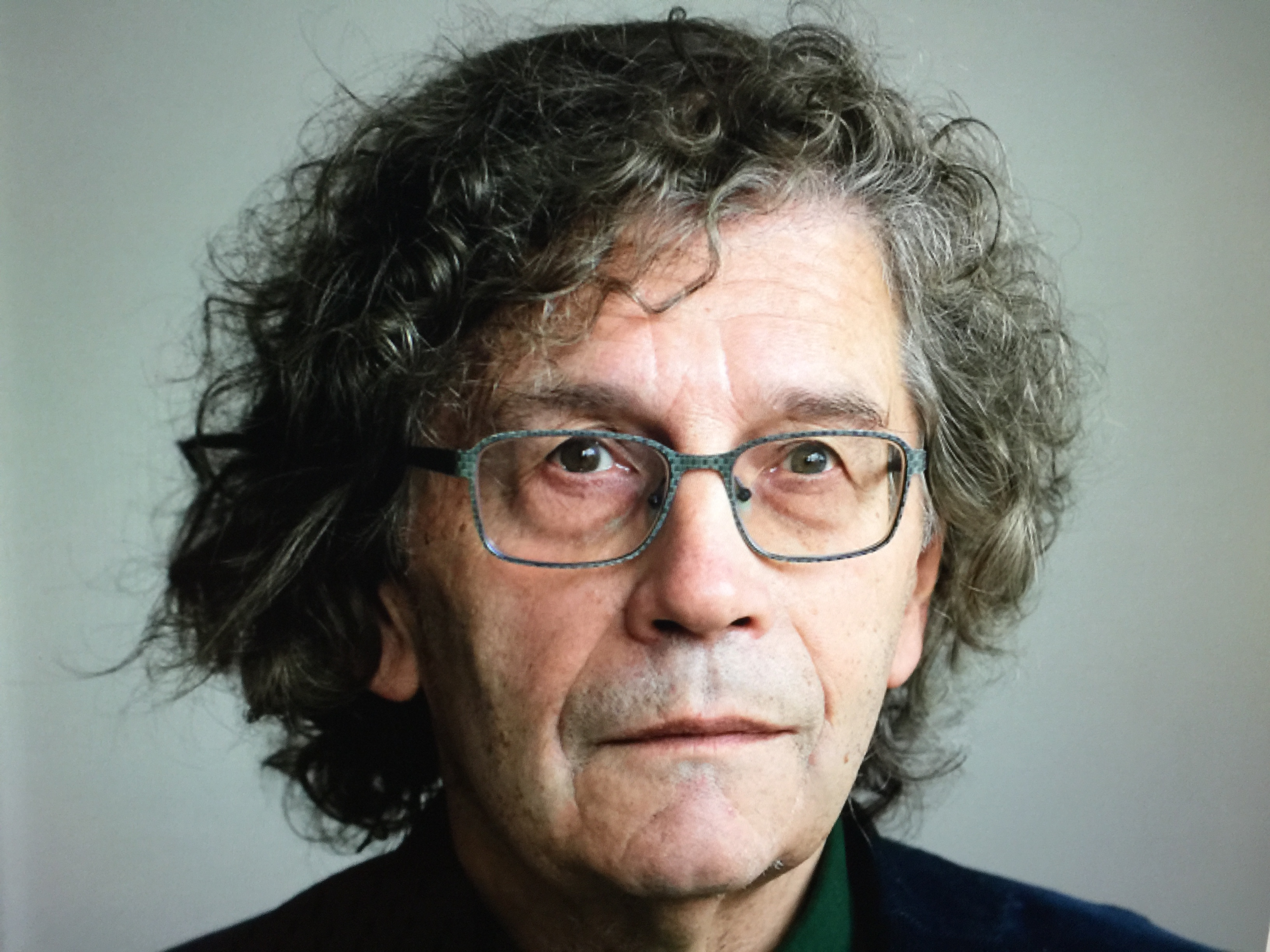
- Reychler in 2019
- Born: Luc E.H.G. Reychler; 30 December 1944 (age 81); Eeklo, Belgium
- Education: Ghent University; London School of Economics; University College London; Harvard University (PhD)
- Occupations: Social scientist; political scientist

Luc E.H.G. Reychler (born 30 December 1944) is a Belgian social and political scientist.

== Early life and education ==
Luc Reychler was born on 30 December 1944 in Eeklo.

He studied business psychology (magna cum laude) and forensic psychology at the University of Ghent. With a research grant from the Royal Society, he immersed himself in international relations, diplomatic sciences, and strategic – and conflict studies at the London School of Economics and University College London. At the University of Oslo, he became acquainted with peace research. At Harvard, Luc Reychler specialized in the political psychology of international relations and conflict, and obtained his PhD in 1976 with a thesis on: ‘Patterns of diplomatic thinking: a cross-national study of structural and social-psychological determinants’.

== Academic career ==
Luc Reychler became a full professor of 'international relations' at the KULeuven. He taught courses on various facets of international behavior: international organization, diplomatic history, Institutions and policies of the United Statestheories and methodology of international relations, strategy and means of power, negotiation and mediation, and peace research. He was the director of the Center for Peace Research and Strategic Studies (CPRS). Together with colleagues from other faculties, he launched an interfaculty Master in Conflict and Sustainable Peace (MaCSP). The Ma became part of the European network of expertise (EDEN) in Peace and Conflict. Luc Reychler was elected Secretary General of the International Peace Research Association (IPRA) from 2004 to 2008. He was appointed to the UNESCO chair for Intellectual Solidarity and Sustainable Peace building. To enrich the peace research training with practical experience, he founded a non-profit organization 'Field diplomacy'. Reychler has taught as a guest professor at the Universities of Boston, California, Irvine, Kent, Helsinki, Kyung Hee University in Seoul, ULBruxelles and Antwerp.

His work focuses on the following themes:

- The architecture of sustainable peacebuilding
- Integral violence analysis
- Behavioral and existential understanding of conflict situations
- The role of time and temperament on conflict and peace dynamics
- Anticipating the consequences of interventions on conflicts and peace dynamics
- Peace Negotiations
- Diplomacy, diplomatic thinking and failing foreign policy
- Intellectual solidarity

== Current activities ==
As emeritus, Luc Reychler uses his newfound academic freedom to (a) update the research on the architecture of sustainable peacebuilding, (b) shed light on the crucial role of time and the use of time (temporament) in conflict and peace processes, and (c) explore the role of humor in the prevention and resolution of deep-seated and violent conflicts. He chaired the Ethics Committee of the World Taekwondo federation and designed an educational card game, for young Taekwondo athletes in refugee camps, about Olympism, global citizenship and peace. The latest update on sustainable peacebuilding is published in an article 'The architecture of sustainable Peace, Encyclopedia of Violence, Peace and Conflict’, 3rd Edition, 2022, Elsevier.

He lives in Binkom and has a son.

== Selected bibliography ==
- Patterns of diplomatic thinking (1979) (ISBN 0-03-046636-9)
- Directory guide of European security and defense research (1985) (ISBN 90-6186-164-0)
- In search of European security (1986) (ISBN 90-6186-210-8)
- European security beyond the year 2000 (1988) (ISBN 0-275-92625-7)
- Peace research and international conflictmanagement (1992) D/1992/2785/1
- Een onvoltooid beleid: Belgische buitenlandse en defensiepolitiek (1993) (ISBN 90-289-1765-9)
- The art of conflict prevention (1994) (ISBN 1-85753-105-1)
- Nieuwe muren: overleven in een andere wereld (1994) (ISBN 978-90-6186-588-9)
- Een wereld veilig voor conflict: handboek voor vredesonderzoek (1995) (ISBN 90-5350-332-3)
- De agressie voorbij: terreindiplomatie (1995) (ISBN 90-5466-192-5)
- Democratic peace-building and conflict prevention: the devil is in the transition (1999) (ISBN 90-6186-985-4)
- Le défi de la paix au Burundi: Théorie et Pratique (1999) (ISBN 2-7384-7343-1)
- Peace building: a field guide (2001) (ISBN 1-55587-912-8)
- De volgende genocide (2004) (ISBN 978-90-5867-426-5)
- Aid for peace: A guide to planning and evaluation for conflict zones (2009) (ISBN 978-3-8329-2582-6)
- RD Congo Pays de l'avenir: Construisons ensemble une paix durable pour un meilleur destin (Positive prospects: Building sustainable peace together) (2010) ISBN 978-90-75376-55-5, 978-90-75376-56-2
- Time for peace: the essential role of time in conflict and peace processes (2015), Brisbane: University of Queensland Press, Australia (ISBN 978-0-7022-5337-9)
- Luc Reychler: A pioneer in Sustainable Peacebuilding Architecture (2020), Springer, Switzerland. (ISSN 2509-5579, 2509-5587). This book provides a detailed overview of the career, peace thinking and publications of Luc Reychler.

== Recent notes ==
Principles of sustainable peace architecture (2021)
