= Edouard Heene =

Belgian building and civil works contractor

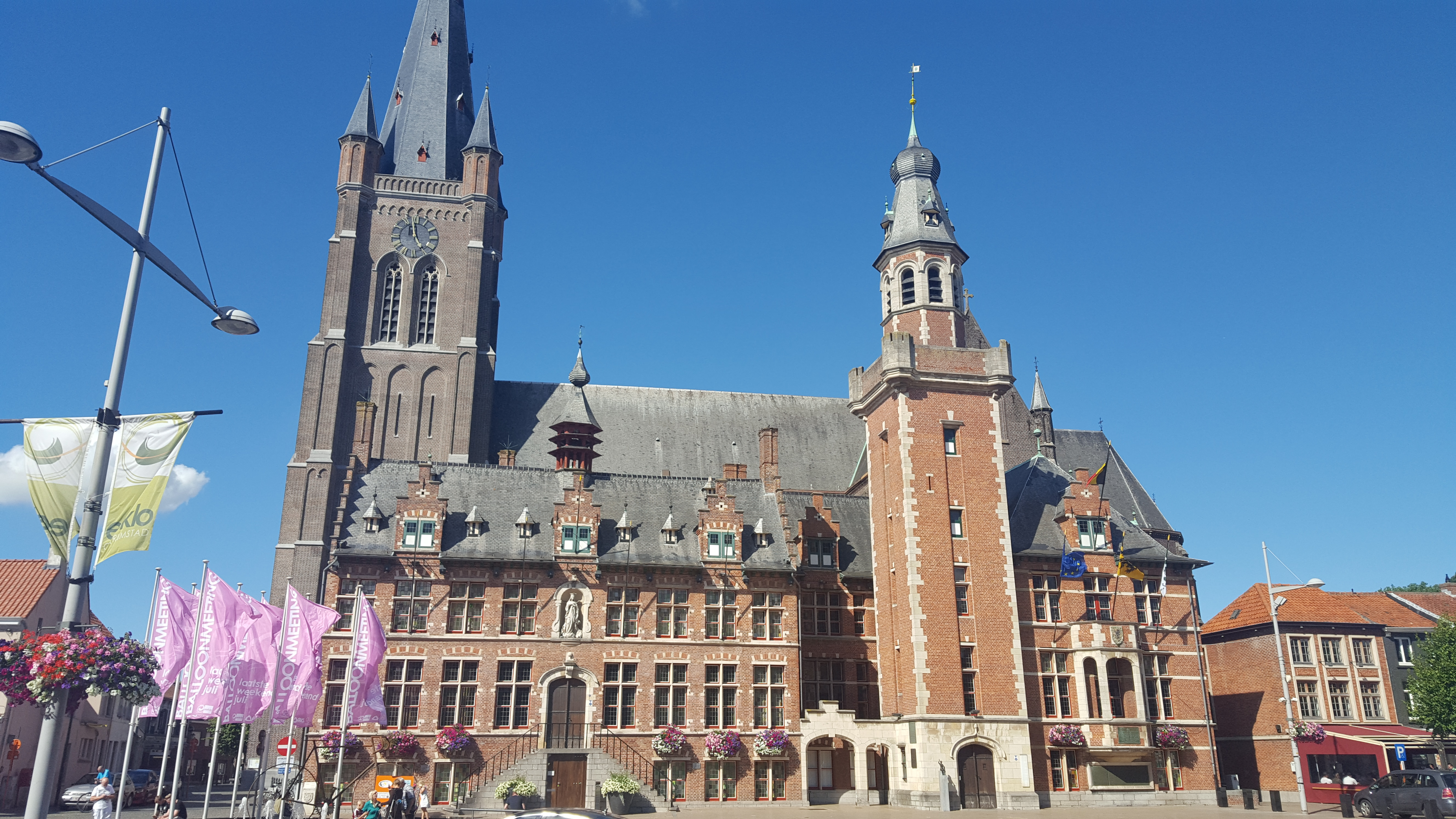
City Hall with Belfry of Eeklo UNESCO World Heritage Site

Edouard Heene (27 Jul 1872 – 24 Jul 1947) was a Belgian master builder in the Meetjesland late in the 19th and early in the 20th century. He was a major figure in the monumental architectural development of Eeklo; among his projects was the City Hall with Belfry of Eeklo (UNESCO World Heritage Site).

== Gallery ==
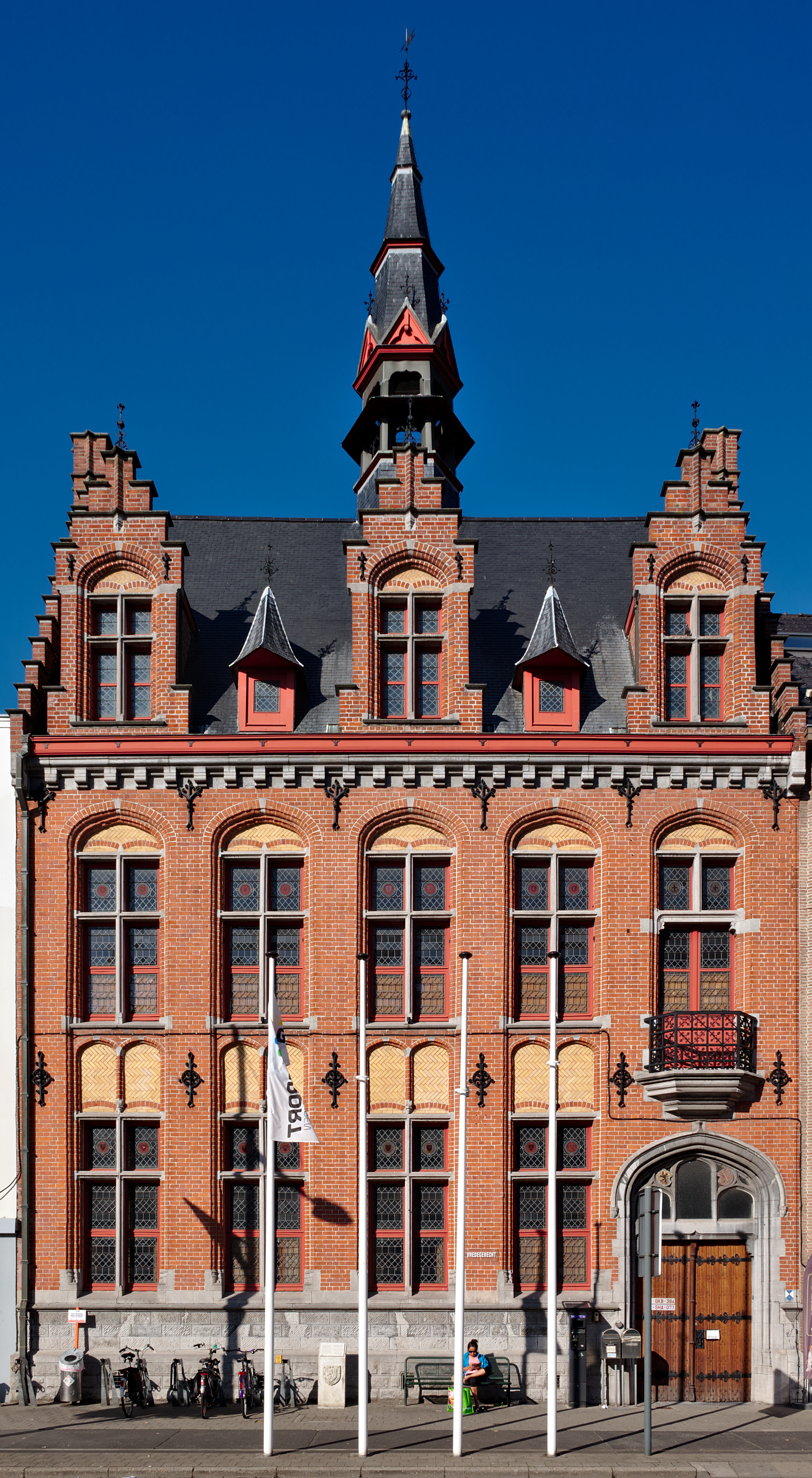
Stationsstraat 21

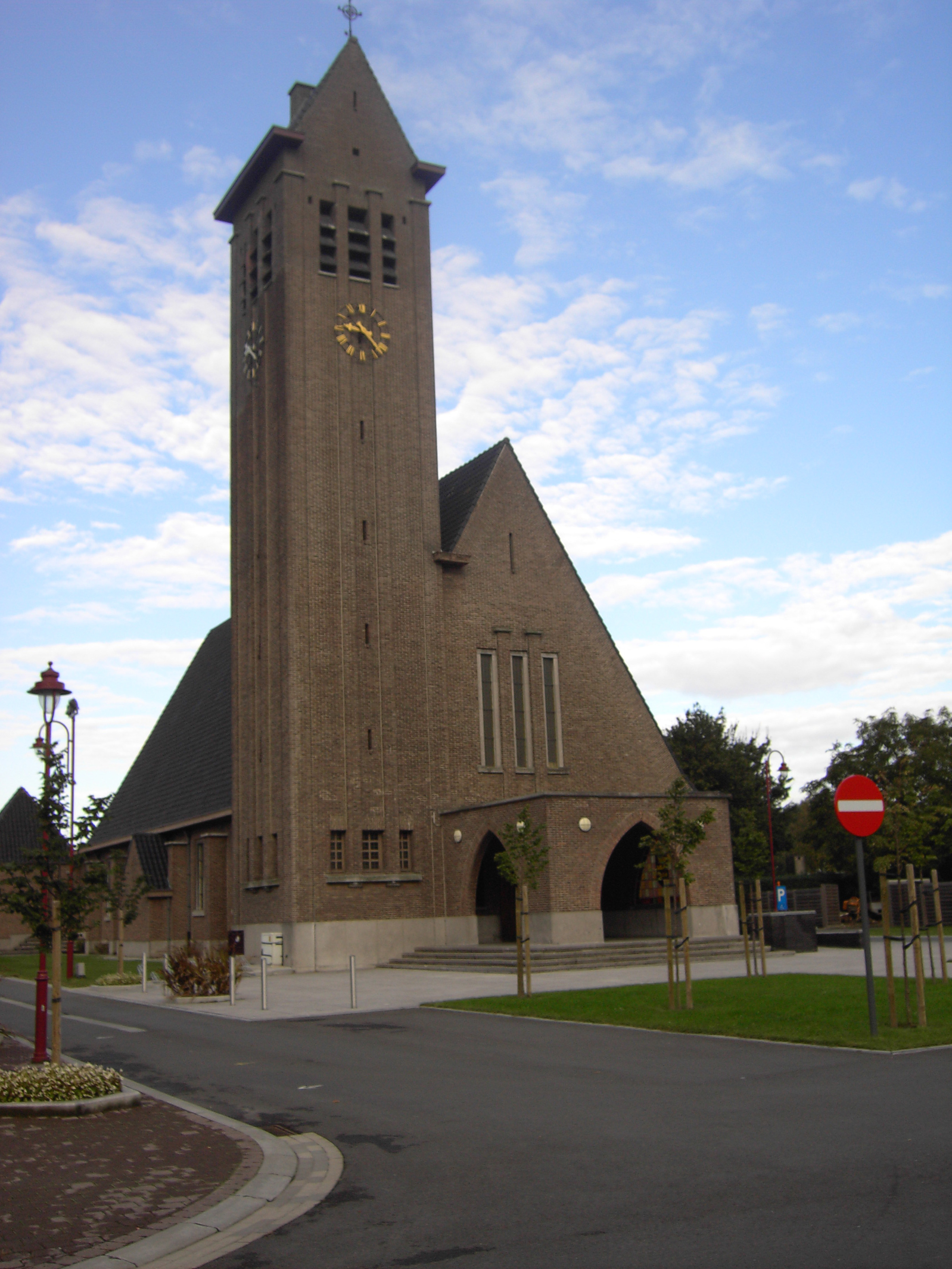
Sint-Godelievestraat 29

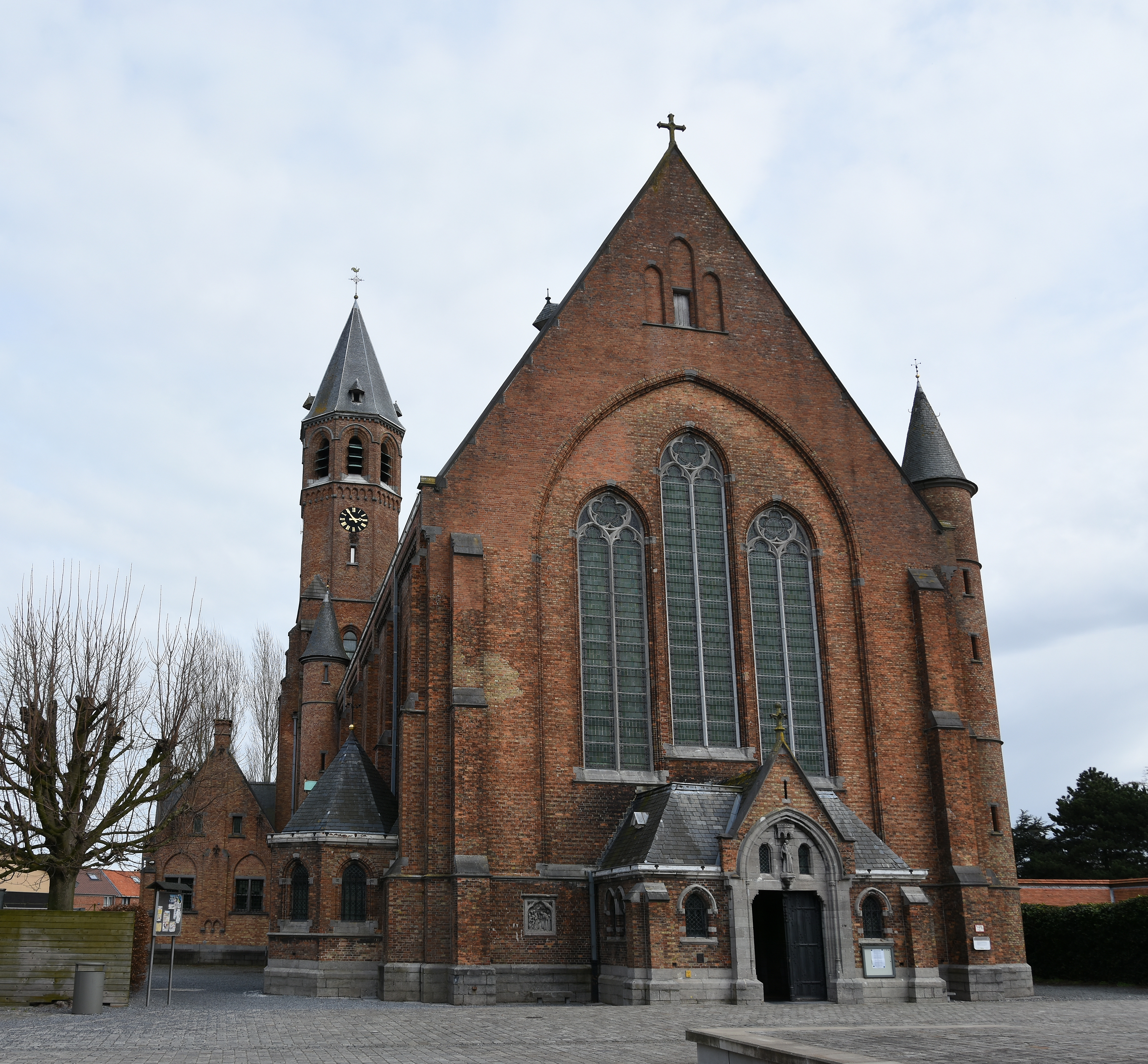
Balgerhoeke

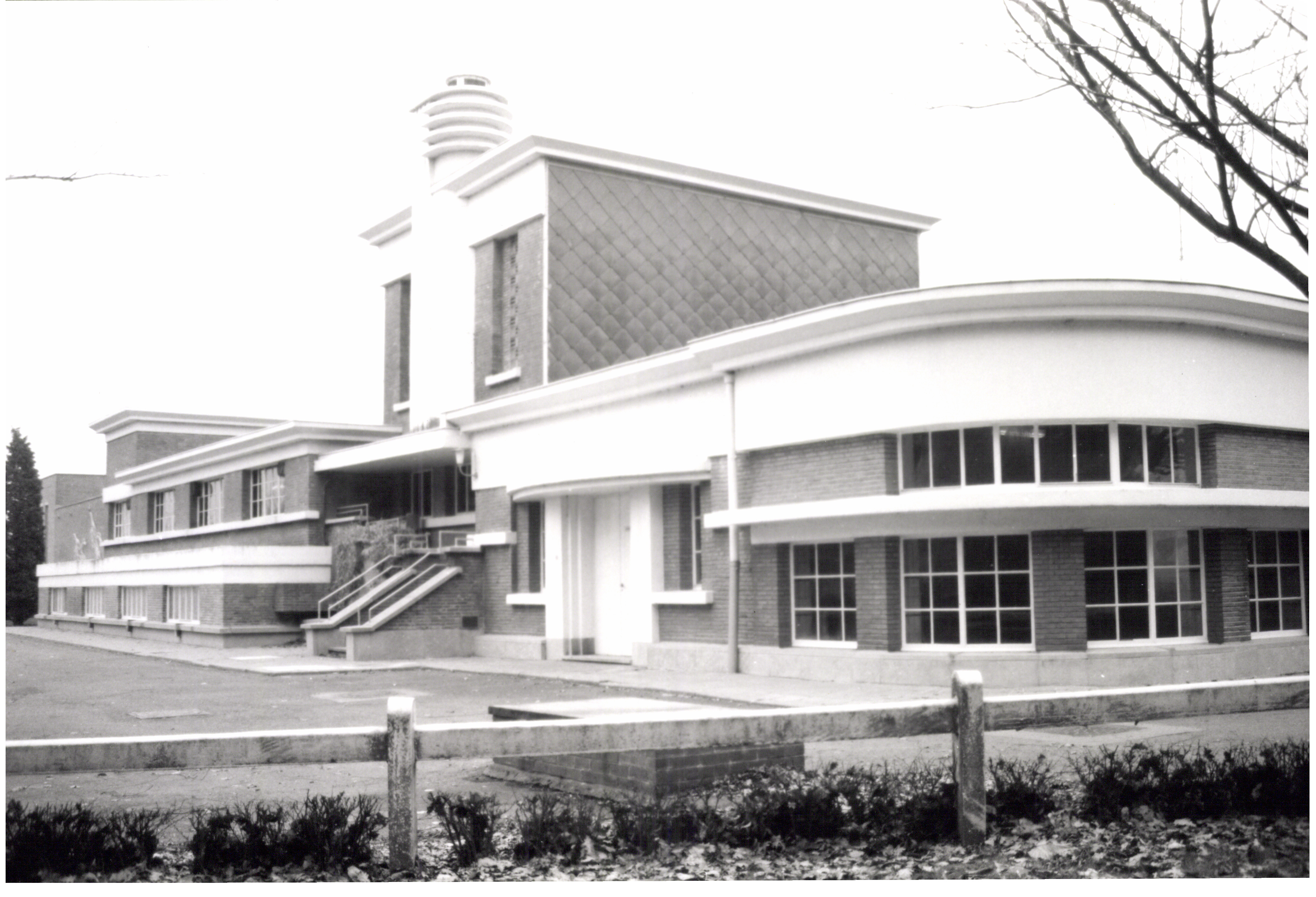
Waaistraat 2-4

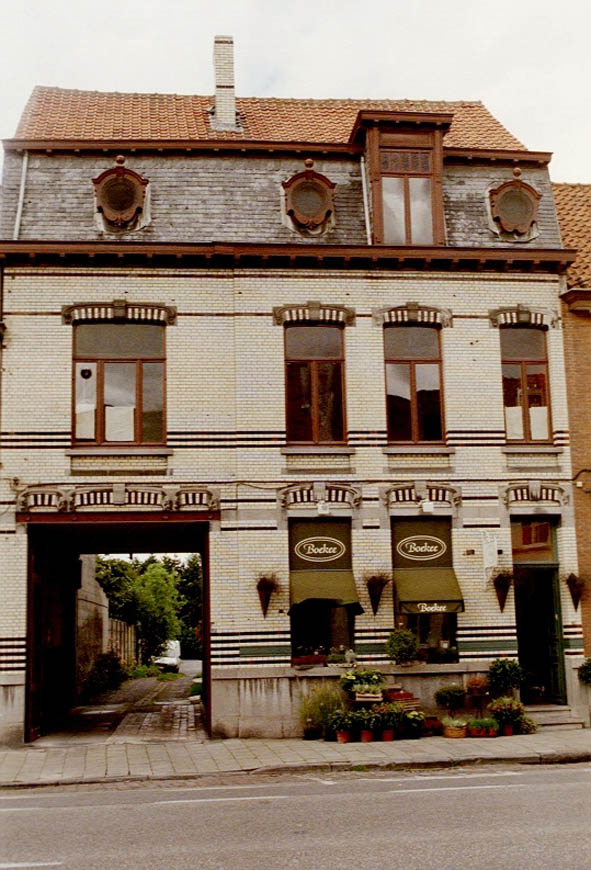
Boelare 41-43

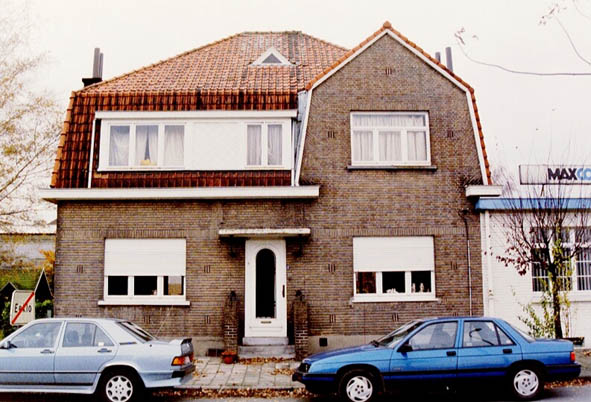
Korte Moeie 57

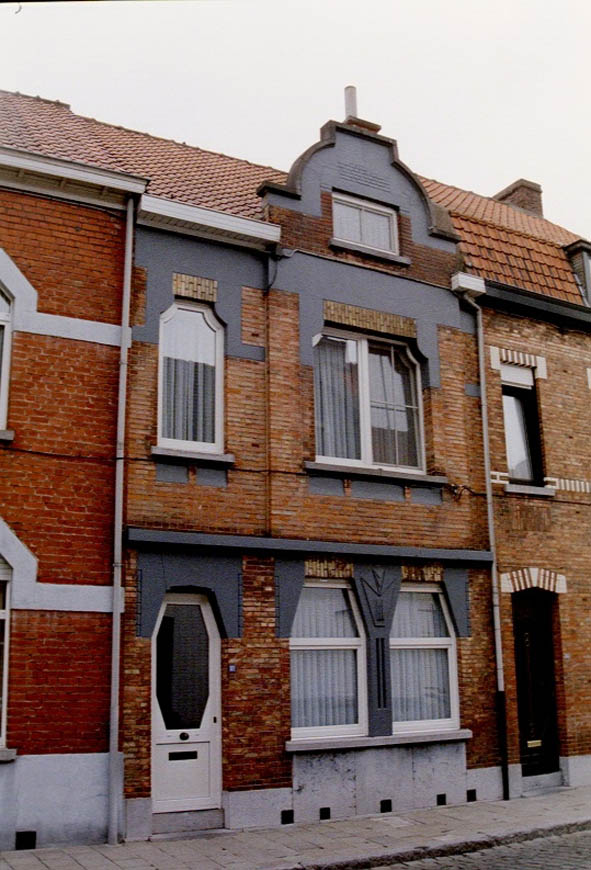
Gulden Sporenstraat 61

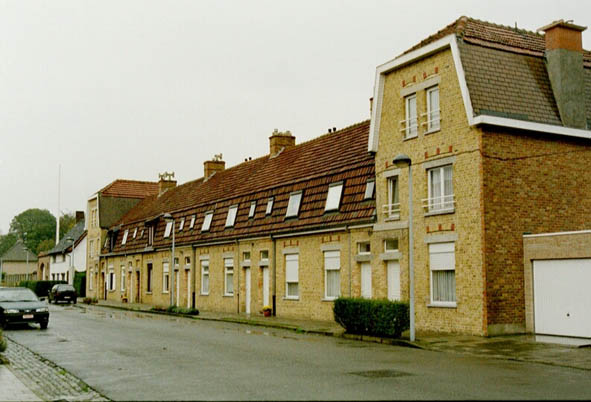
Ijzerstraat 17-36

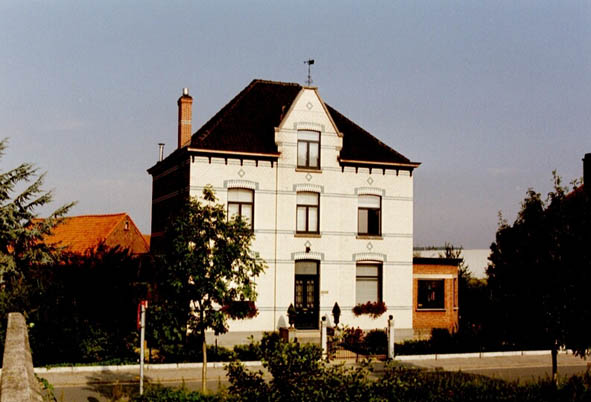
Nijverheidskaai 15

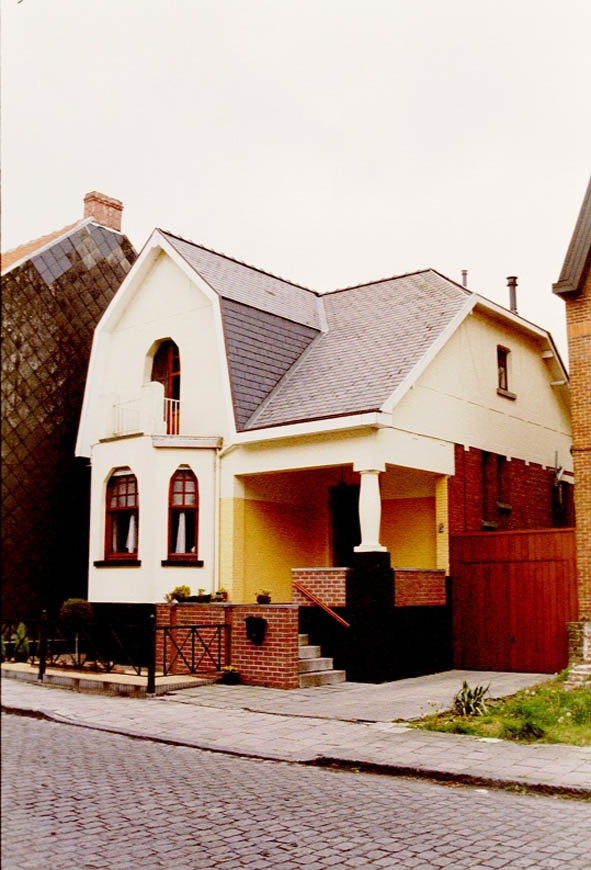
Gulden Sporenstraat 7

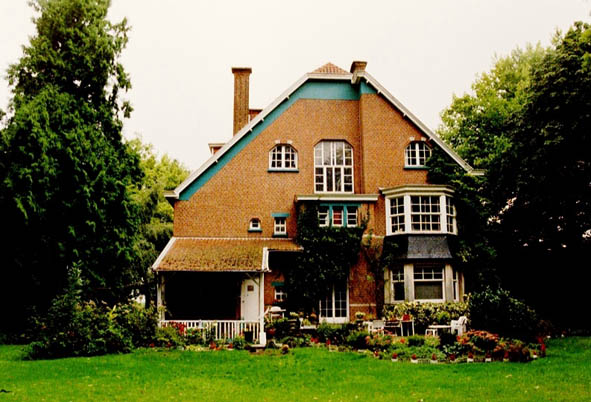
Gentsesteenweg 74

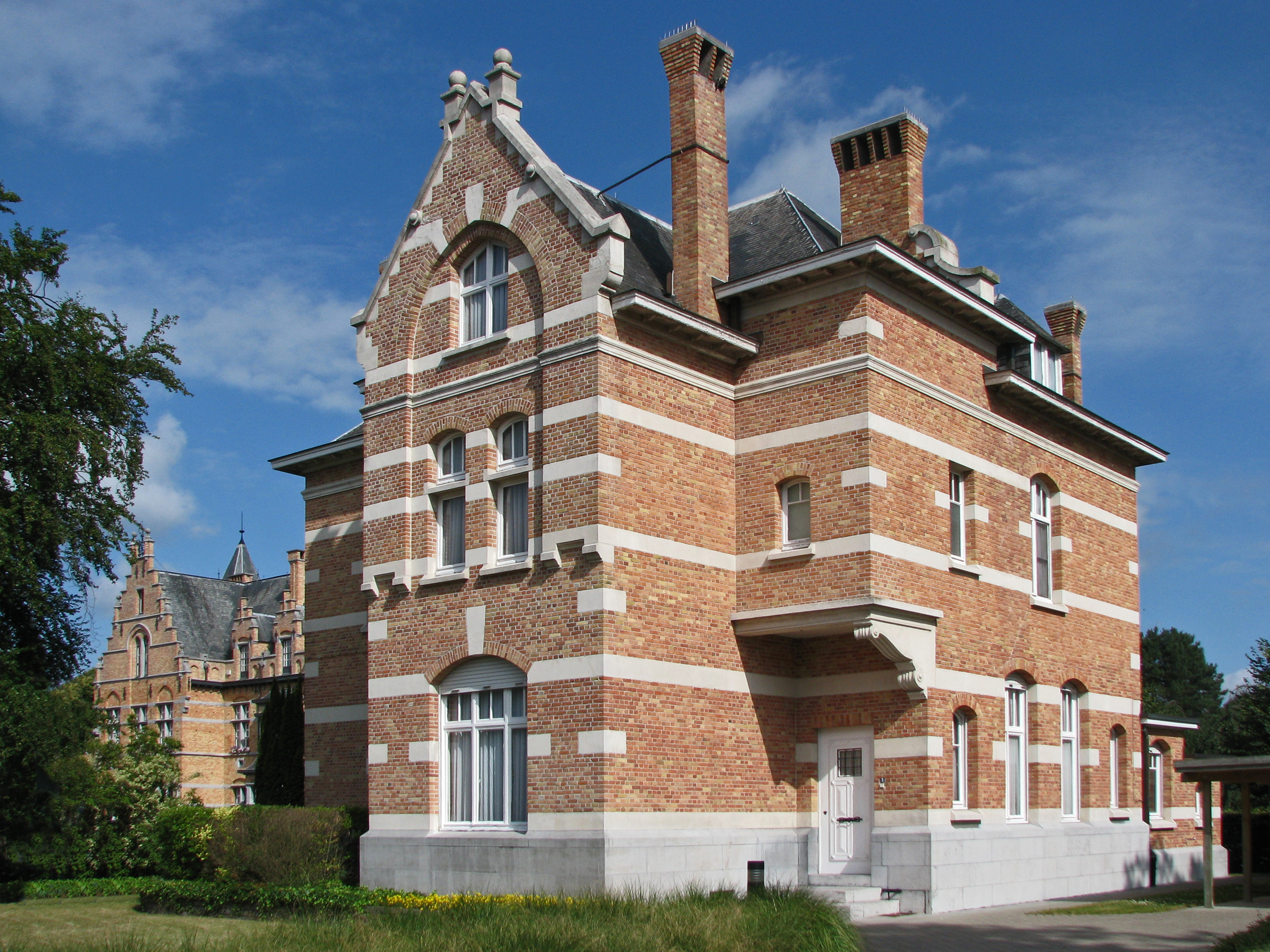
Oostveldstraat 3

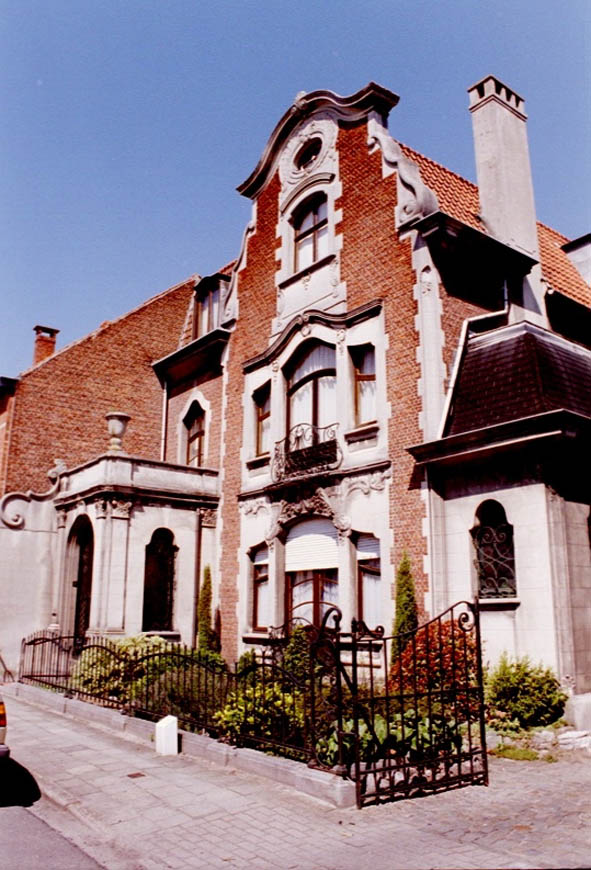
Molenstraat 162-164

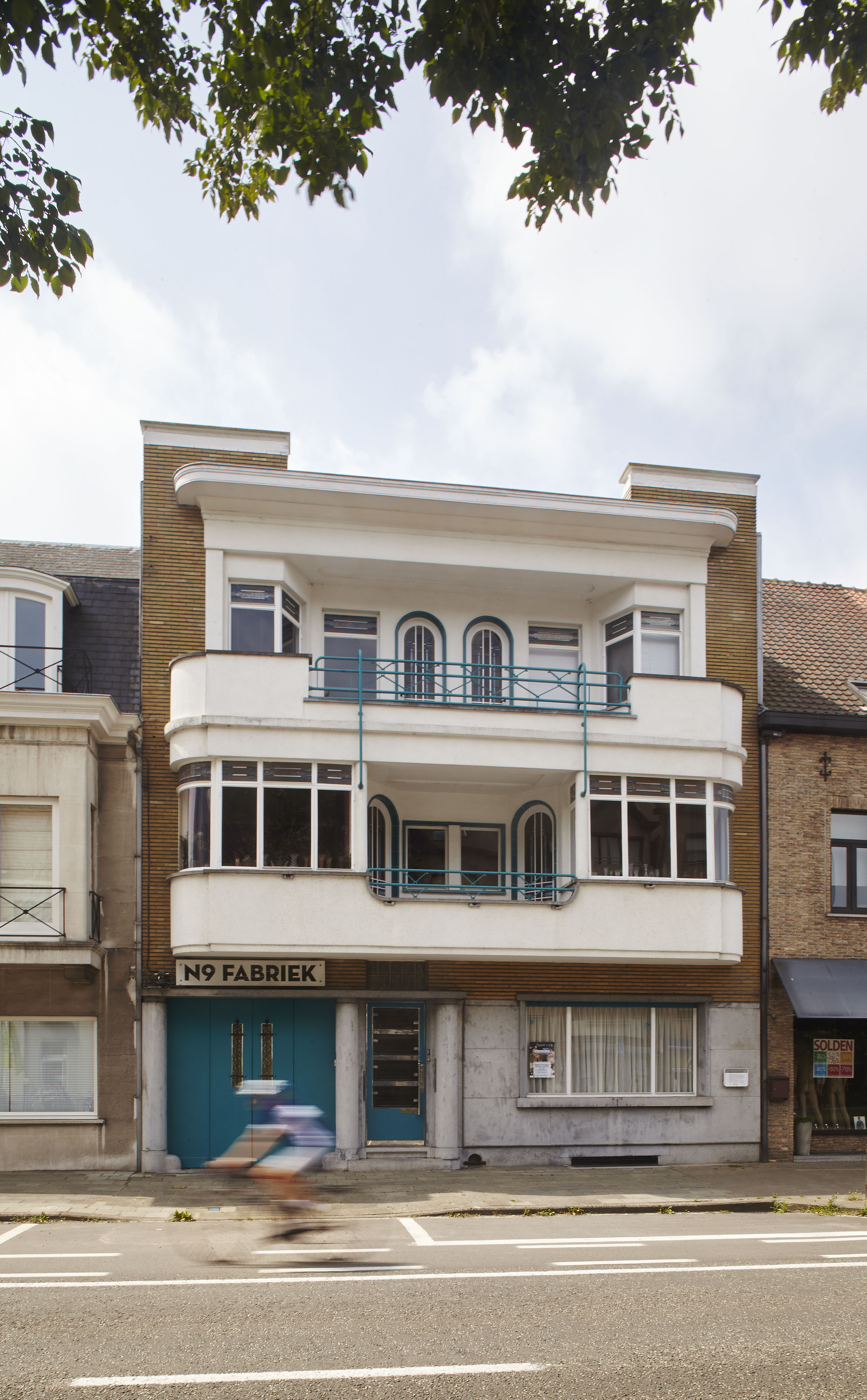
Molenstraat 33

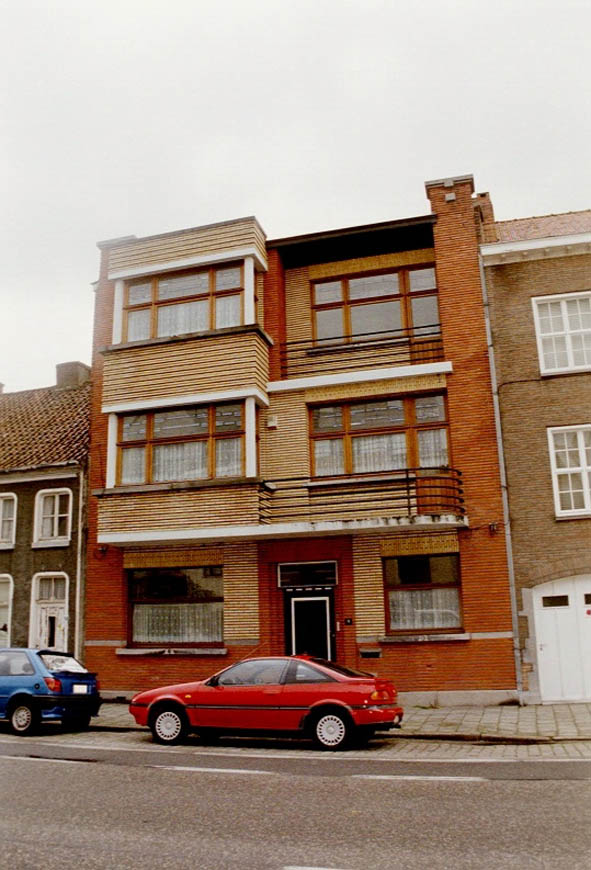
Boelare 79

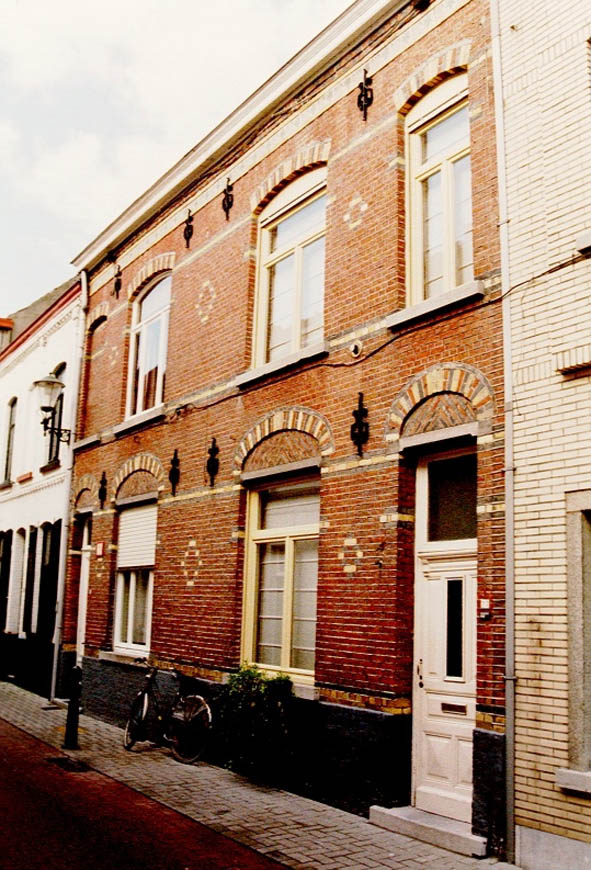
Prinsenhofstraat 25-27

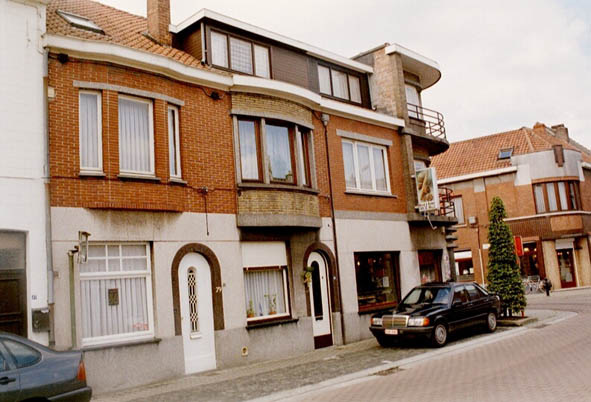
Zuidmoerstraat 79-81

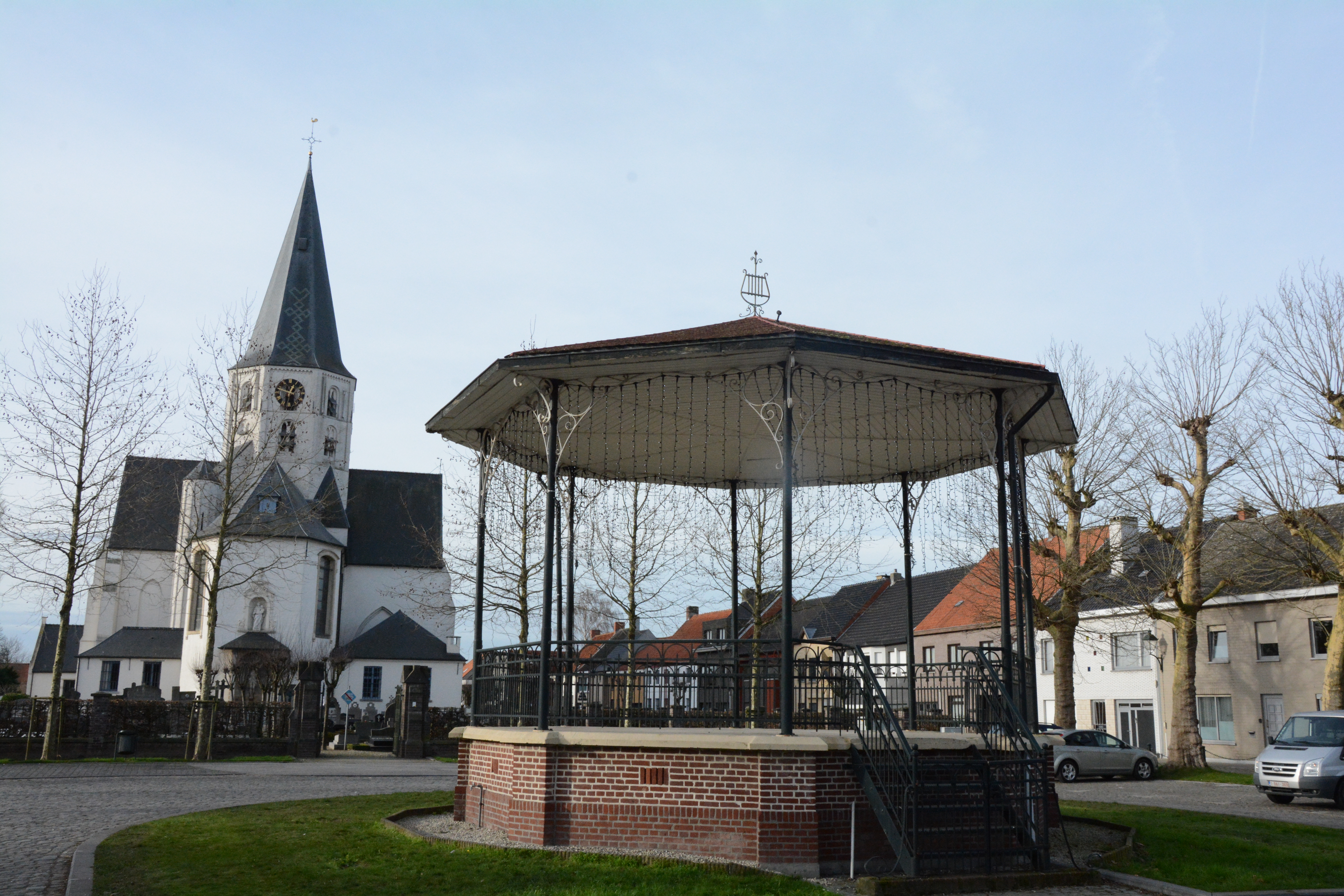
Dorp

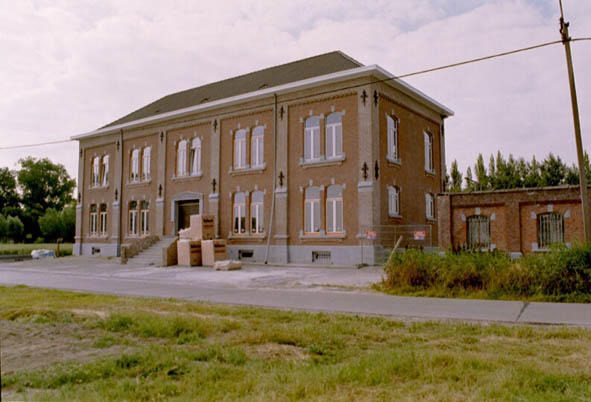
Calusstraat 13

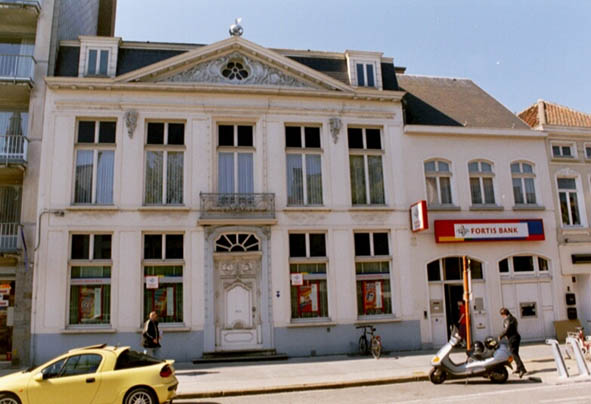
Stationsstraat 4-6

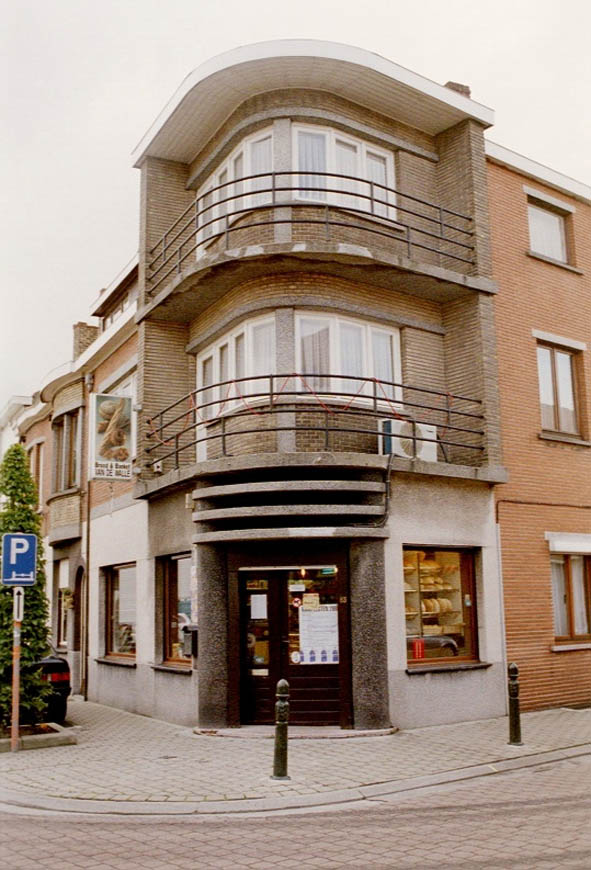
Zuidmoerstraat 83

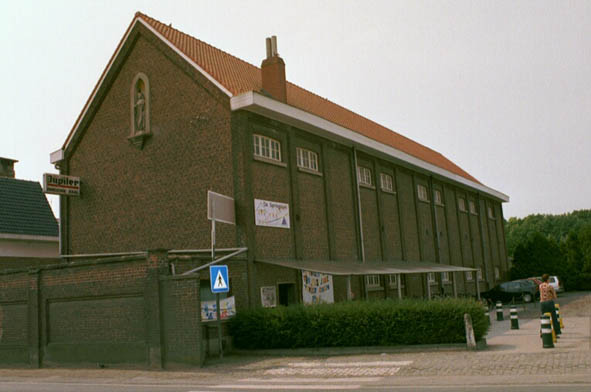
Moerstraat 2-3

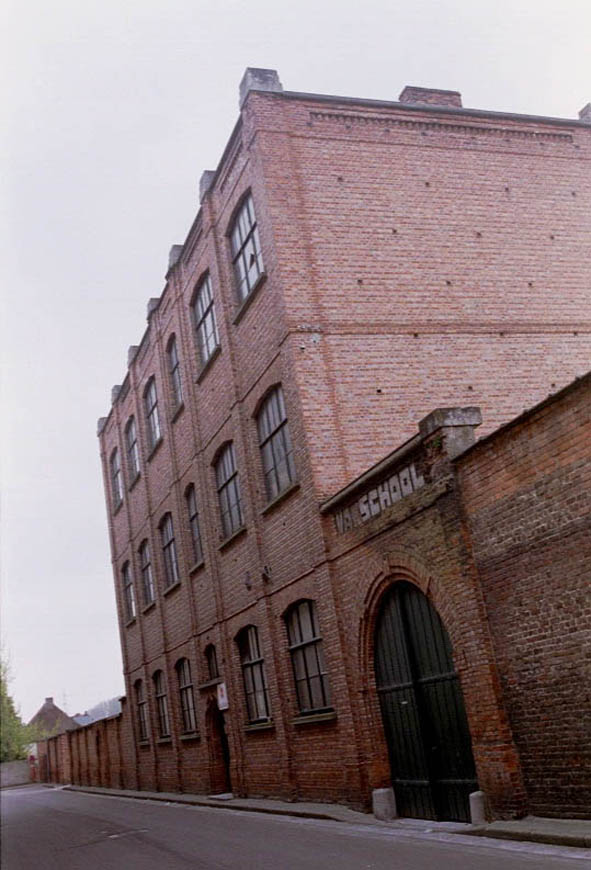
Zuidmoerstraat 129

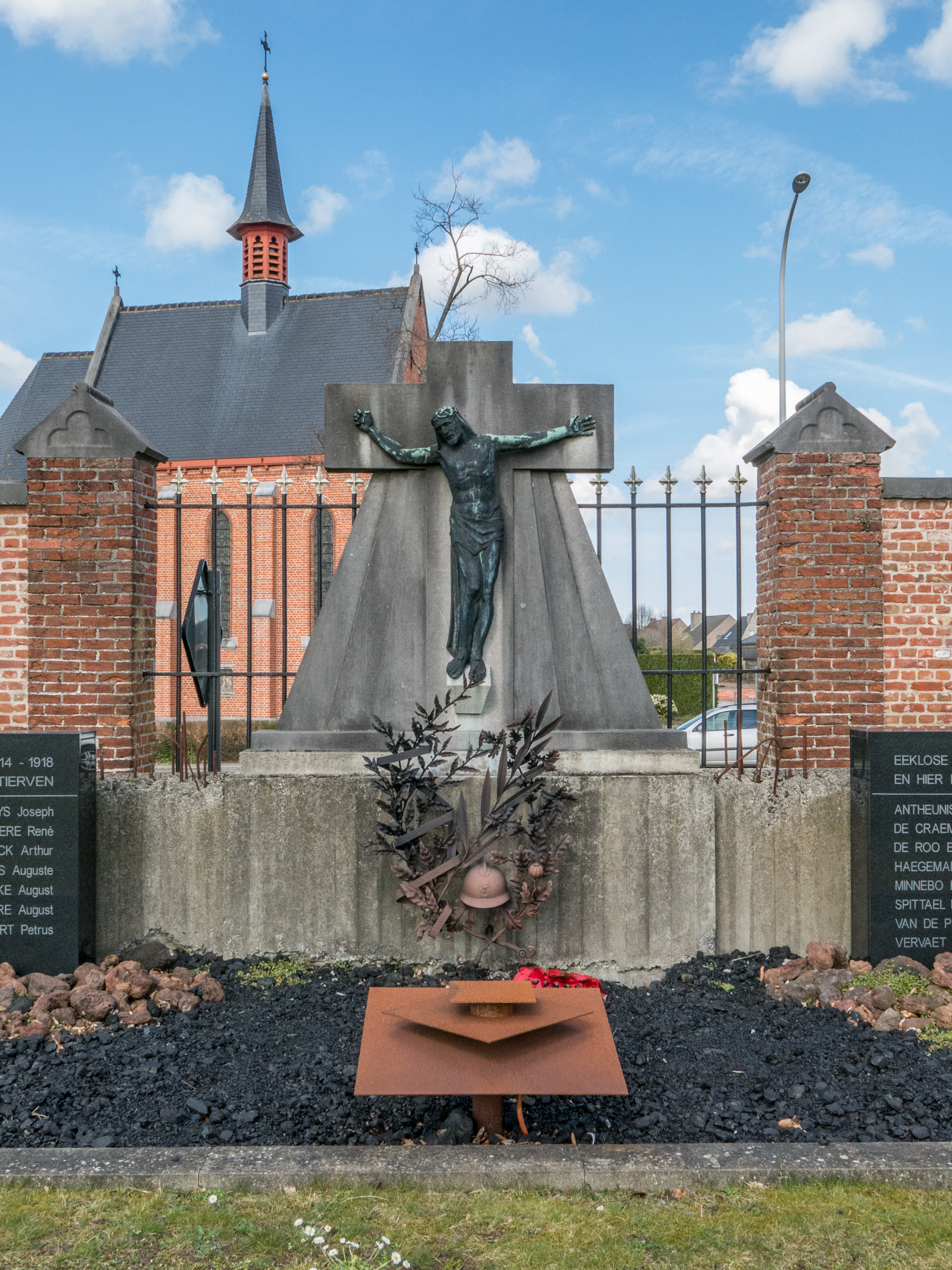
Molenstraat

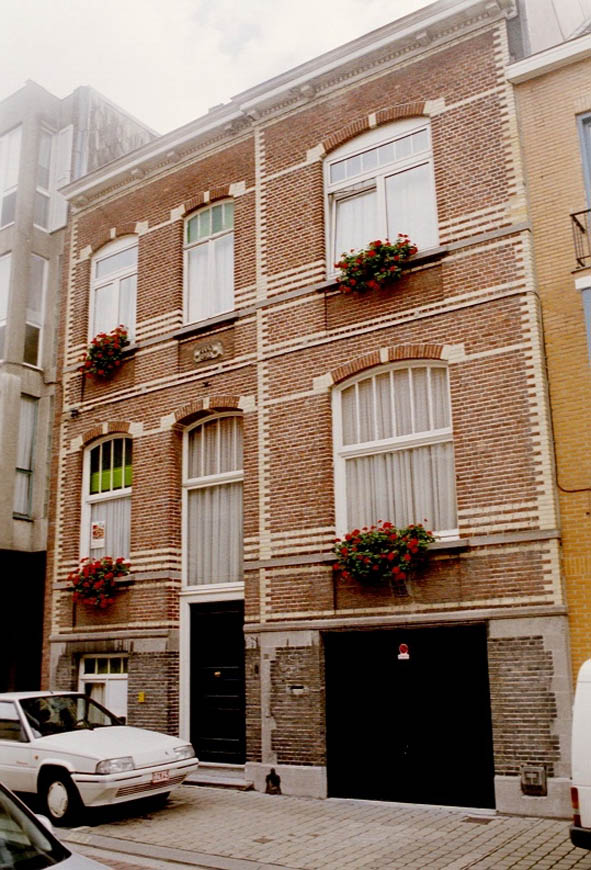
Visstraat 17

== Honours ==
- Pro Ecclesia et Pontifice
