= Guido van Heulendonk =

Flemish writer (born 1951)

Guido Beelaert (born 17 November 1951) pseudonym Guido van Heulendonk is a Flemish writer. The Flemish National Television made a film out of his first novel Hoogtevrees ("Fear of Heights").

He was born at Eeklo.

== Bibliography ==
- Hoogtevrees(1985)
- Logboek van een narrenschip (1988)
- Vreemde vogels(1989)
- De echo van de raaf (1991)
- De vooravond (1994)
- Paarden zijn ook varkens (1995; English "Horses are also Pigs" - awarded with the Gouden Uil for fiction)
- Aimez-vous les moules?(1998)
- Buiten de wereld (2000)
- Barnsteen(2010)
- En dan, als ik weg ben (2014)
- Niemand uit België (2016)
- De afrekening (2019)

== See also ==
- Flemish literature

== Sources ==
- Guido van Heulendonk
- Guido van Heulendonk
