= Holy Burial Chapel =

Chapel in Eeklo, Belgium

Coordinates: 51°11′25″N 3°33′21″E

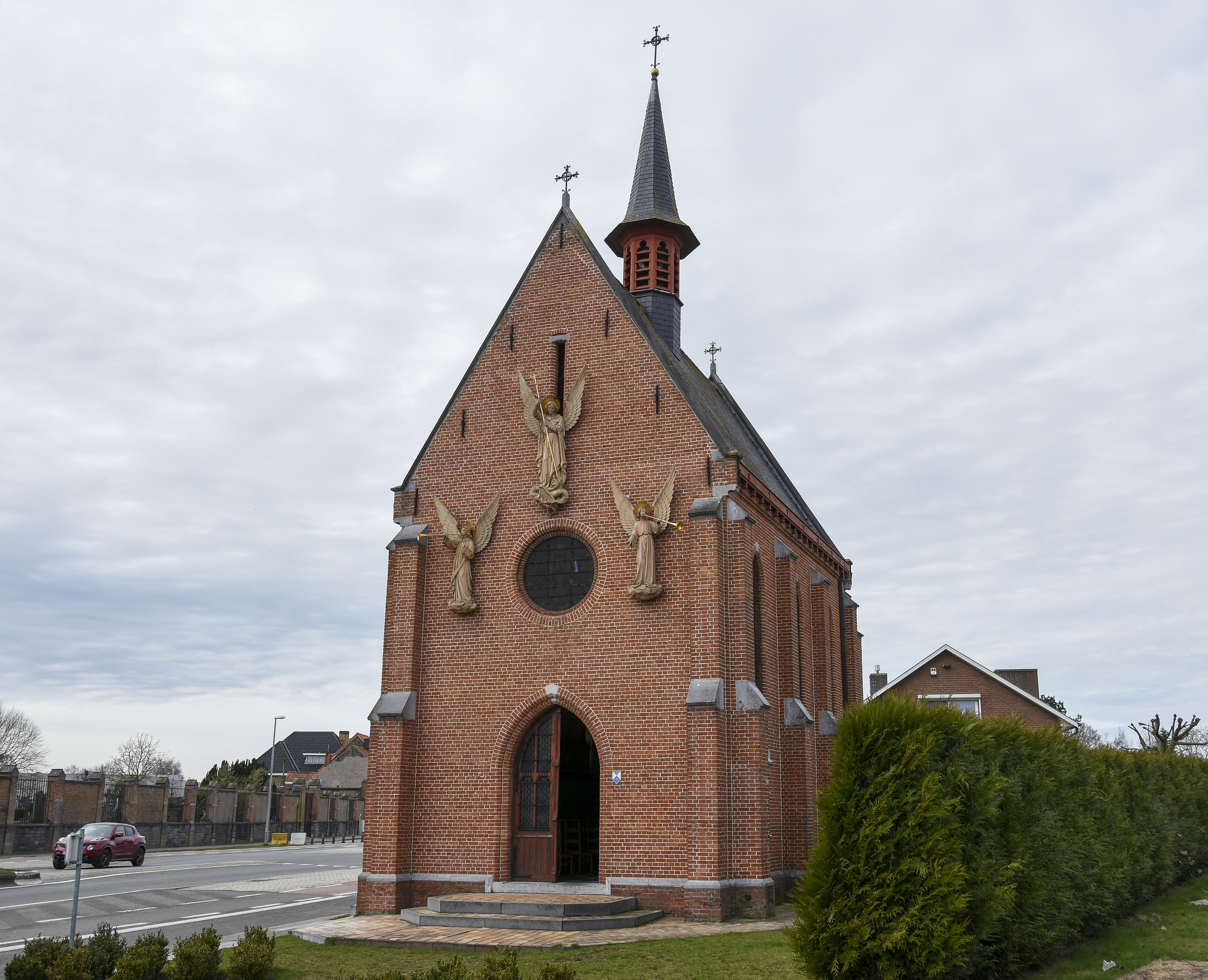
The Holy Burial Chapel

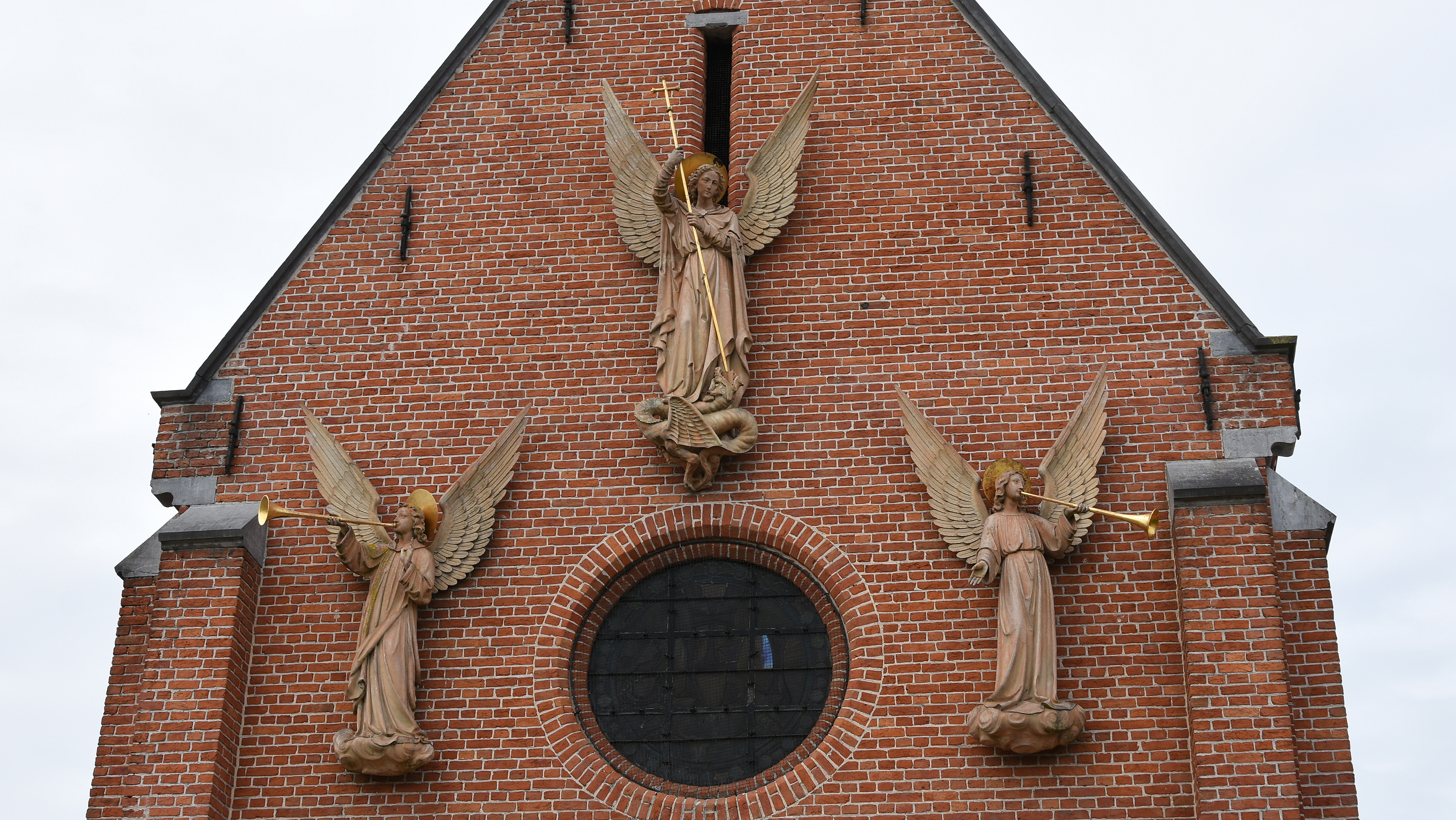
The facade of the Holy Burial Chapel

The Holy Burial Chapel (also known as the Chapel of the Holy Sepulchre; in Dutch: Heilig Grafkapel) is a chapel in Eeklo, Belgium, close to the Eeklo cemetery. It is a protected monument in Belgium.

The chapel, single-aisled and made of bricks and natural stone, was built in 1898, under supervision of the city architect Frans van Wassenove. There are various terracotta statues, of which the topmost represents the Archangel Michael. The statues, designed by Fernand Nisol, were restored by students of the Provincial Institute of Eeklo in 2004. The roof turret, which had been removed, was reconstructed in 2002.

== Gallery ==
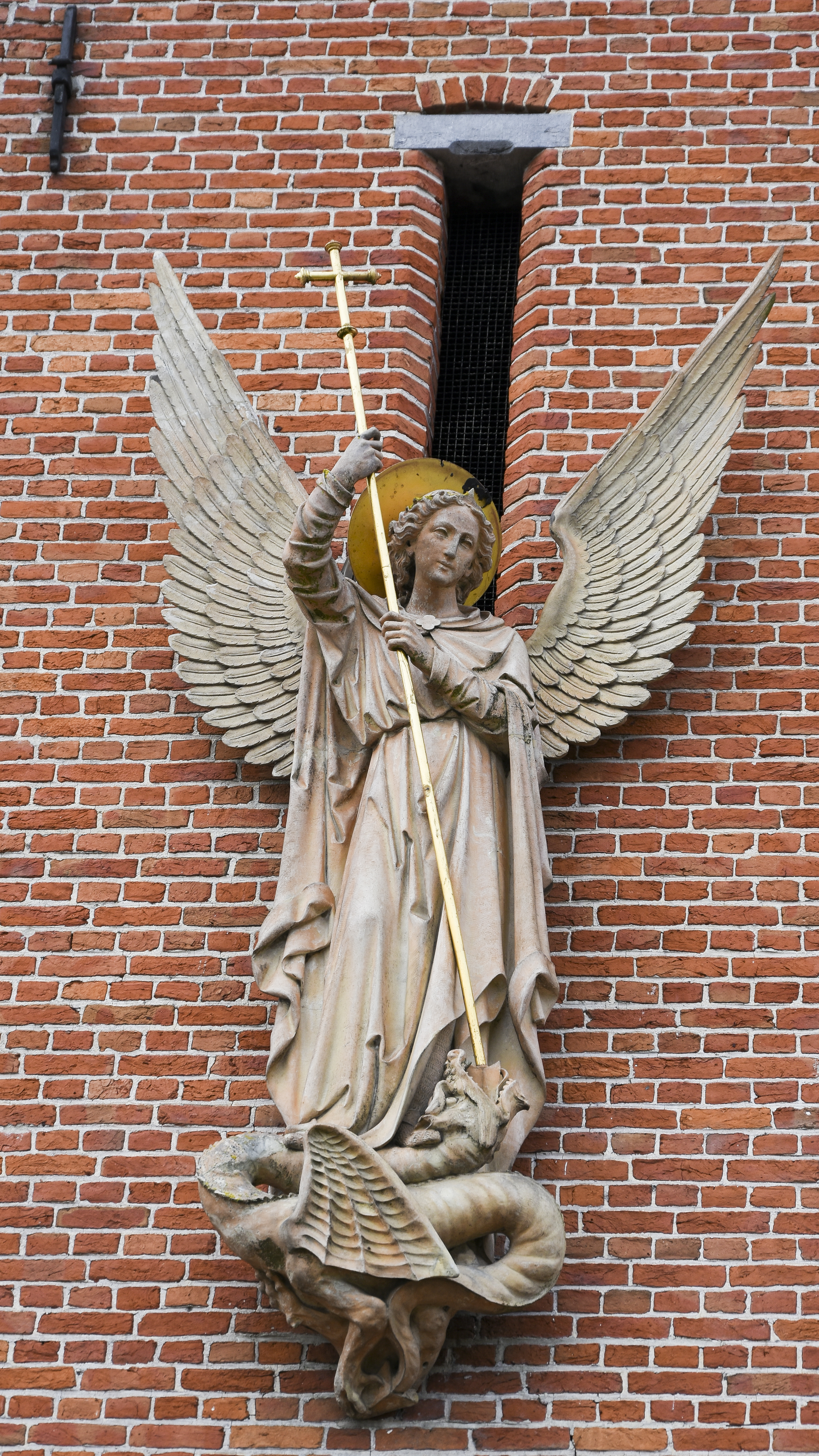
Archangel Michael

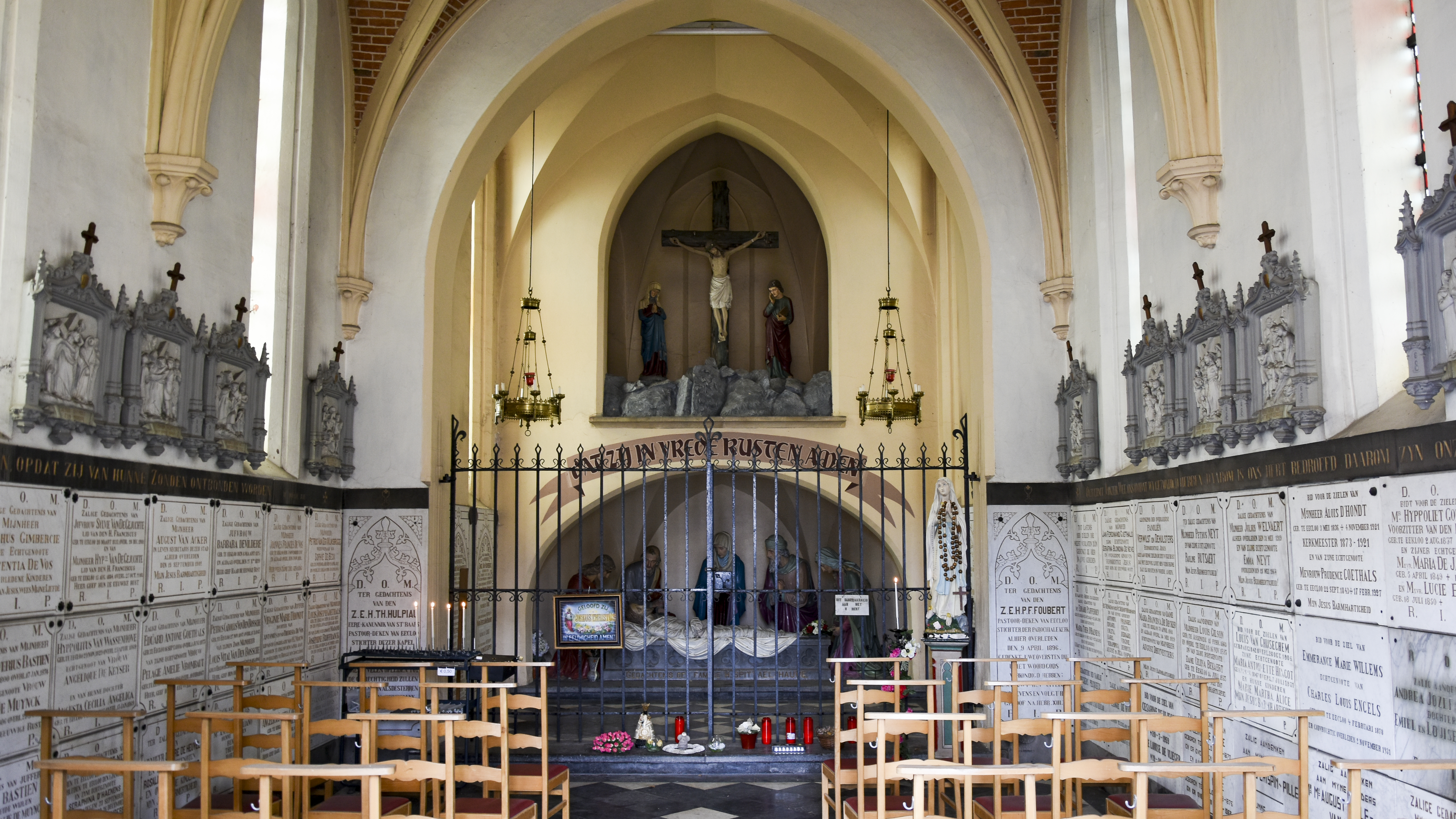
Interior

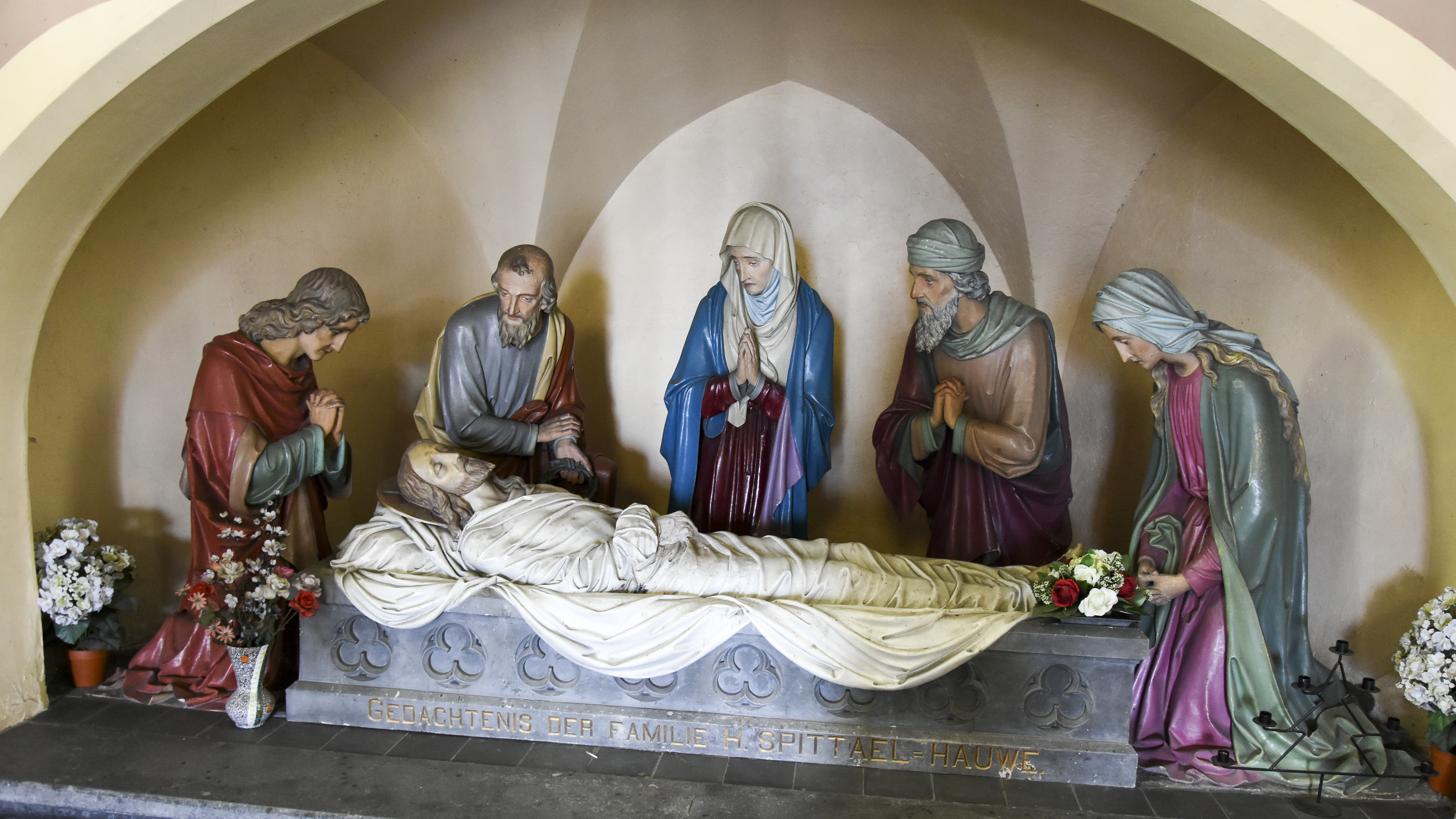
The Entombment

== Sources ==
- Infofiche van Onroerend Erfgoed België
