= Lodewijk Cuypers =

Belgian entrepreneur

Lodewijk Cuypers (born 23 May 1977 in Eeklo, Belgium) is a Belgian entrepreneur and Honorary Consul of Belgium for the provinces of Valencia and Castellón, Spain. He is the co-founder of Globexs (Global Expatriate Services SL), a relocation and expat housing company headquartered in Valencia, Spain.

== Early life and education ==
Cuypers was born and raised in Eeklo, Belgium. He studied commercial engineering at the University of Antwerp and international economics at the University of Deusto (Bilbao) and the University of Nebraska Omaha, where he participated in an international exchange programme. During his studies abroad he gained direct experience of the difficulties facing foreign students seeking short-term accommodation.

== Career ==
=== Globexs ===
In the late 1990s, while based in Antwerp, Cuypers began providing informal short-term housing assistance to Erasmus students and incoming expatriates. In 2002, he formally founded Globexs (Global Expatriate Services SL), initially focusing on language and translation services for expatriates in Belgium.

In 2009, Globexs expanded into furnished apartment rentals in Antwerp. In 2010, Cuypers relocated to Valencia, Spain, where he was joined by Tiscar Navarro, an immigration and property lawyer, who became his wife and business partner. Together they established the company's Valencia headquarters and expanded its services to include furnished temporary rentals, legal immigration assistance, visa support, and property management.

Globexs subsequently developed a presence in multiple cities, including Valencia, Madrid, Barcelona, Antwerp, and Brussels, and established subsidiary brands including Bluekey Homes and Nestor Property Management.

In September 2025, Globexs became the official partner of Torrent CF football club for the 2025–26 season, providing housing, documentation, and relocation support to the club's international players and their families.

Cuypers has discussed the company's services and the growth of remote working in Spain in interviews with Levante-EMV and the Spanish business television channel Negocios TV.

=== Remote working initiatives ===
Cuypers has been involved in the development of corporate remote working programmes in Valencia, combining housing, legal support, and community integration services for companies relocating employees to Spain.

In February 2026, he participated as a panellist in "València, the Ecosystem for Digital Nomads", an event organised by the Ajuntament de València through its València Innovation Capital initiative and held at Les Naus. He appeared on the first panel alongside representatives of Startup Valencia and The Terminal Hub, discussing Valencia's role as a destination for international talent.

=== Honorary Consul of Belgium ===
Since 2023, Cuypers has served as the Honorary Consul of Belgium for the provinces of Valencia and Castellón, representing Belgian citizens and interests in the region. In this capacity he is a member of the Cuerpo Consular de Valencia. He has participated in official events of the Cuerpo Consular, including the Primera Gala de la Diversidad organised by the Generalitat Valenciana.

Cuypers is a member of the Cámara de Comercio de Bélgica y Luxemburgo en España (CCBLE) and has participated in events organised by the AHK Spanien (German Chamber of Commerce in Spain).

== Personal life ==
Cuypers is married to Tiscar Navarro, CEO and co-founder of Globexs. He has lived in Valencia since 2010, having previously resided in Bilbao, Madrid, and Antwerp.
