= Flanders Heritage Agency =

- Agentschap Onroerend Erfgoed
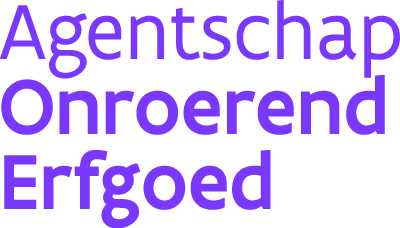
- Logo of the Flanders Heritage Agency

Government agency overview
- Formed: July 1, 2011; 14 years ago
- Jurisdiction: Flemish Government
- Headquarters: Herman Teirlinck Building, Brussels, Belgium
- Government agency executive: Peter De Wilde, Administrator-General

The Flanders Heritage Agency is an agency of the Flemish government that supports the minister responsible for immovable heritage in formulating a well-founded and up-to-date policy for immovable heritage in Flanders. Its tasks include inventorying and protecting valuable buildings, landscapes, archaeological sites and historic vessels in Flanders. Furthermore, the agency supports the management of immovable heritage in Flanders and conducts policy-oriented research.

== History ==
The Flanders Heritage Agency was established on the 1st of July 2011. From that time all policy-executing tasks for the field of Immovable Heritage were housed in one agency. In 2017, the agency moved from the Phoenix Building to the Herman Teirlinck Building, both situated in Brussels.

== Administrators-General ==
As of 2024, the Flanders Heritage Agency is led by Administrator-General Peter De Wilde.

== Inventorying ==
The Flanders Heritage Agency compiles scientific inventories of architectural, archaeological, and landscape heritage. There are also thematic inventories on heritage trees, organs, World War heritage, historic gardens and parks, and historic vessels. The inventory of immovable heritage provides an overview of valuable heritage in Flanders: more than 90,000 objects in total. Inclusion in this scientific inventory has no legal consequences. The item is merely described and documented.

Verified immovable heritage is included in the inventory and 'verified' through a legal procedure. Verified items are subject to certain legal consequences, which vary depending on the inventory.

== Protection ==
Immovable heritage can be protected because of its value to the community. The legislation provides for five possible protection statutes: a monument, a city- or townscape, a cultural landscape, an archaeological site, and a historic vessel. A protection procedure involves two steps: a provisional and a definitive protection. A provisional protection is preceded by a research and advisory phase, organized by the agency. After completion of the procedure, the minister responsible for immovable heritage decides on the protection.

Protection entails legal consequences, including passive and active preservation of the heritage and a prohibition on demolition or destruction.

== Supporting the Management of Immovable Heritage ==
The Flanders Heritage Agency advises and collaborates with owners, designers, developers, and local authorities on dossiers, permits and the providing of advice and information. For this, one can appeal to the agency’s regional services. The agency also provides financial support to owners and managers of protected immovable heritage and heritage landscapes in the form of grants, loans, reduction of personal income tax, and reduction of sales and gift tax.

Certain authorities, institutions, and individuals can assume responsibility in immovable heritage care. For this, the agency issues recognitions for immovable heritage municipalities (Dutch: Onroerenderfgoedgemeente or OEG), inter-municipal immovable heritage services (Dutch: intergemeentelijke onroerenderfgoeddienst or IOED), immovable heritage depots, archaeologists, and metal detectorists. Recognized IOEDs and immovable heritage depots can receive a subsidy from the agency.
