= Eeklo =

- Municipality
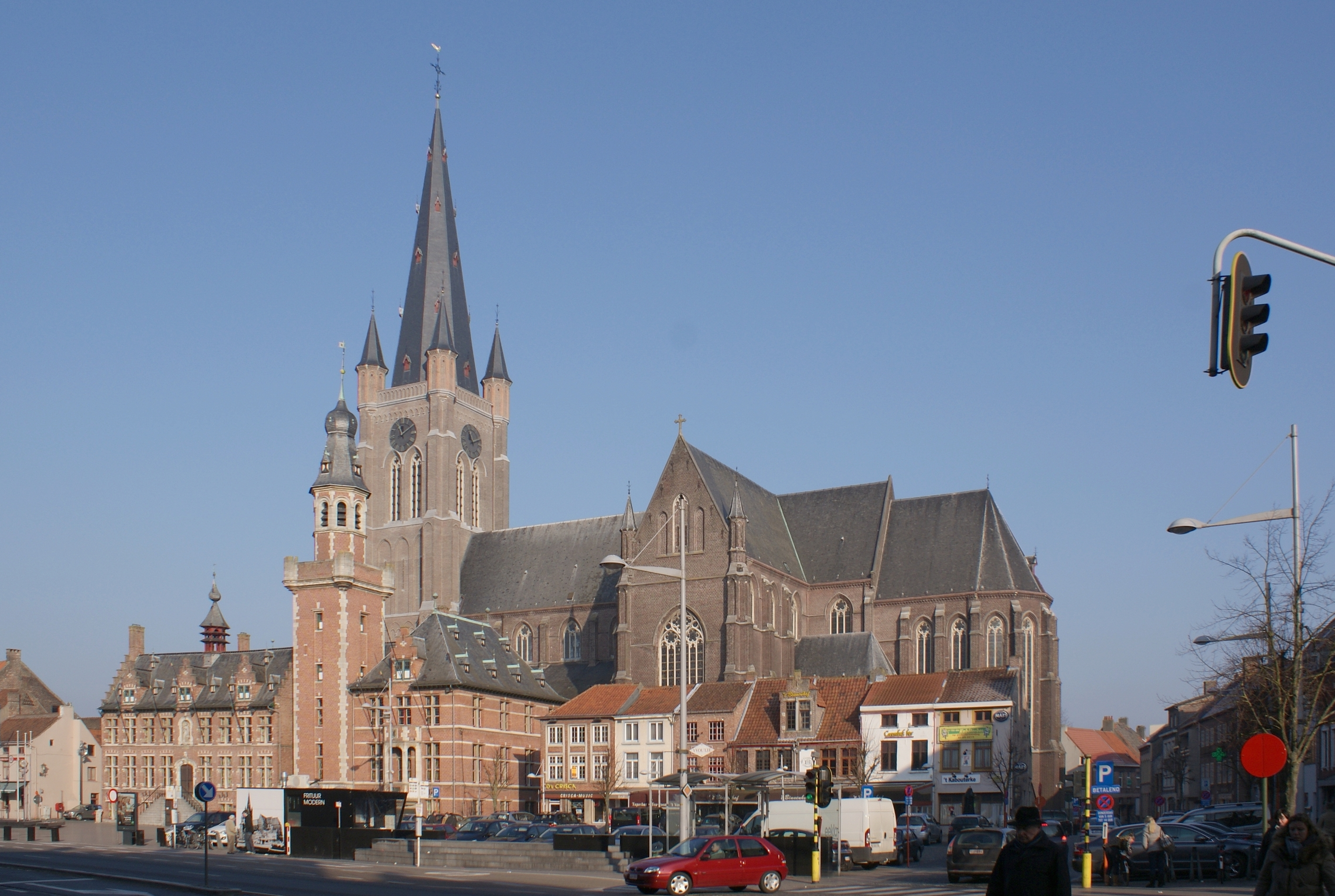
- Eeklo city hall, church, and market square

- Flag Coat of arms

- Location of Eeklo in East Flanders
- Interactive map of Eeklo
- Location in Belgium
- Coordinates: 51°11′N 03°33′E
- Country: Belgium
- Community: Flemish Community
- Region: Flemish Region
- Province: East Flanders
- Arrondissement: Eeklo

Government
  - Mayor: Luc Vandevelde (SMS Eeklo)
  - Governing parties: SMS Eeklo, Open VLD, Groen

Area
  - Total: 30.45 km^{2} (11.76 sq mi)

Population (2018-01-01)
  - Total: 20,890
  - Density: 686.0/km^{2} (1,777/sq mi)
- Postal codes: 9900
- NIS code: 43005
- Area codes: 09
- Website: www.eeklo.be

Eeklo (Dutch pronunciation: [ˈeːkloː]) is a Belgian municipality in the Flemish province of East Flanders. The municipality comprises only the city of Eeklo proper. The name Eeklo comes from the contraction of eke and lo, two Old German words meaning 'oak' and 'sparse woods' (compare English Oakley).

== History ==
=== Origins and Middle Ages ===
There are not many traces of early habitation in the Eeklo area. It is presumed that some oaks would have attracted the attention of travellers on the Roman road that ran along the local sandbar among the marshes. By 1240, a town had grown here and had already become important enough to warrant a civic charter by Jeanne of Constantinople, Countess of Flanders. Over the years, the marshes were drained to give place to fortified farms, some remnants of which can still be seen today (Groot Goed). Like most other cities in the County of Flanders, Eeklo's economy was based on the cloth industry, and commercial relations were established with the more powerful neighbouring cities, Ghent and Bruges.

=== 16th century - present ===
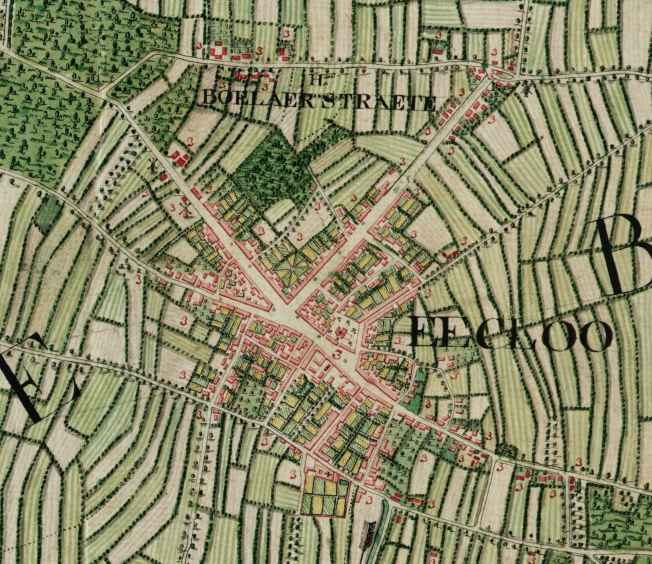
Eeklo on the Ferraris map (around 1775)

During the second half of the 16th century, Eeklo was in the unfortunate position of being on the border between the Catholic south and the Protestant north, which resulted in so much destruction that the town was nearly abandoned by its inhabitants. At around that time the legend of "recooking" appeared, actually a rejuvenation recipe that involved drinking a youth elixir, cutting one's head off and baking it again. While the head was in the oven, a green cabbage took its place on the body, symbol of the empty head.

The 18th and 19th centuries were more favourable and the textile industry took off again. Most of the town's schools and neo-Gothic buildings date from that period. Today, Eeklo is changing its vocation from an industrial town to one of services to the neighbouring communities.

== Main sights ==
- The town hall and belfry have been designated by UNESCO as a World Heritage Site in 1999.
- Eeklo has a few notable churches and chapels, such as the Holy Burial Chapel, the St Vincent Church (Sint-Vincentiuskerk) and the chapel of the clinic of the Holy Heart (Heilig Hartkliniek).
- A nearby provincial park, “Het Leen”, includes an arboretum and museum.
- A local park, the Heldenpark, offers concerts in summer, and houses a playground for children, bowling areas for seniors, and a soccer and baseball field.

== Famous inhabitants ==
- Leon L. Van Autreve, fourth United States Sergeant Major of the Army (1920–2002)
- Edouard Heene, (born 1872 in Eeklo), master builder
- Erik De Vlaeminck, cyclist, 7 times world champion cyclo-cross (born 1945)
- Roger De Vlaeminck, cyclist, world champion cyclo-cross in 1975, winner of 11 "Monument" classic cycle races (born 1947)
- Paul Van Hyfte (born 1972 in Eeklo), cyclist
- Rudy Matthijs (born 1959 in Eeklo), cyclist
- Frederik Willems (born 1979 in Eeklo), cyclist
- Dirk Braeckman, artist and photographer (b. 1958)
- Olivier De Cock (born 1975 in Eeklo), soccer player
- Maarten Martens (born 1984 in Eeklo), soccer player
- Tonny Mols (born 1969 in Eeklo), soccer player
- Guido van Heulendonk (pseudonym of Guido Beelaert) (born in Eeklo), writer
- Karel Lodewijk Ledeganck (born 1805 in Eeklo), writer
- Peter Van de Veire (born 1971 in Eeklo), radio personality
- Tom Dice (born 1989 in Eeklo), singer and songwriter, represented Belgium in Eurovision Song Contest 2010
- Lodewijk Cuypers (born 1977 in Eeklo), entrepreneur and Honorary Consul of Belgium in Valencia, Spain

== Twin cities ==
- Newbury, England
- Braunfels, Germany
- Bagnols-sur-Cèze, France
- Carcaixent, Spain
- Feltre, Italy
