= Poeke Castle =

Castle in East Flanders, Belgium

- East Flanders, Belgium
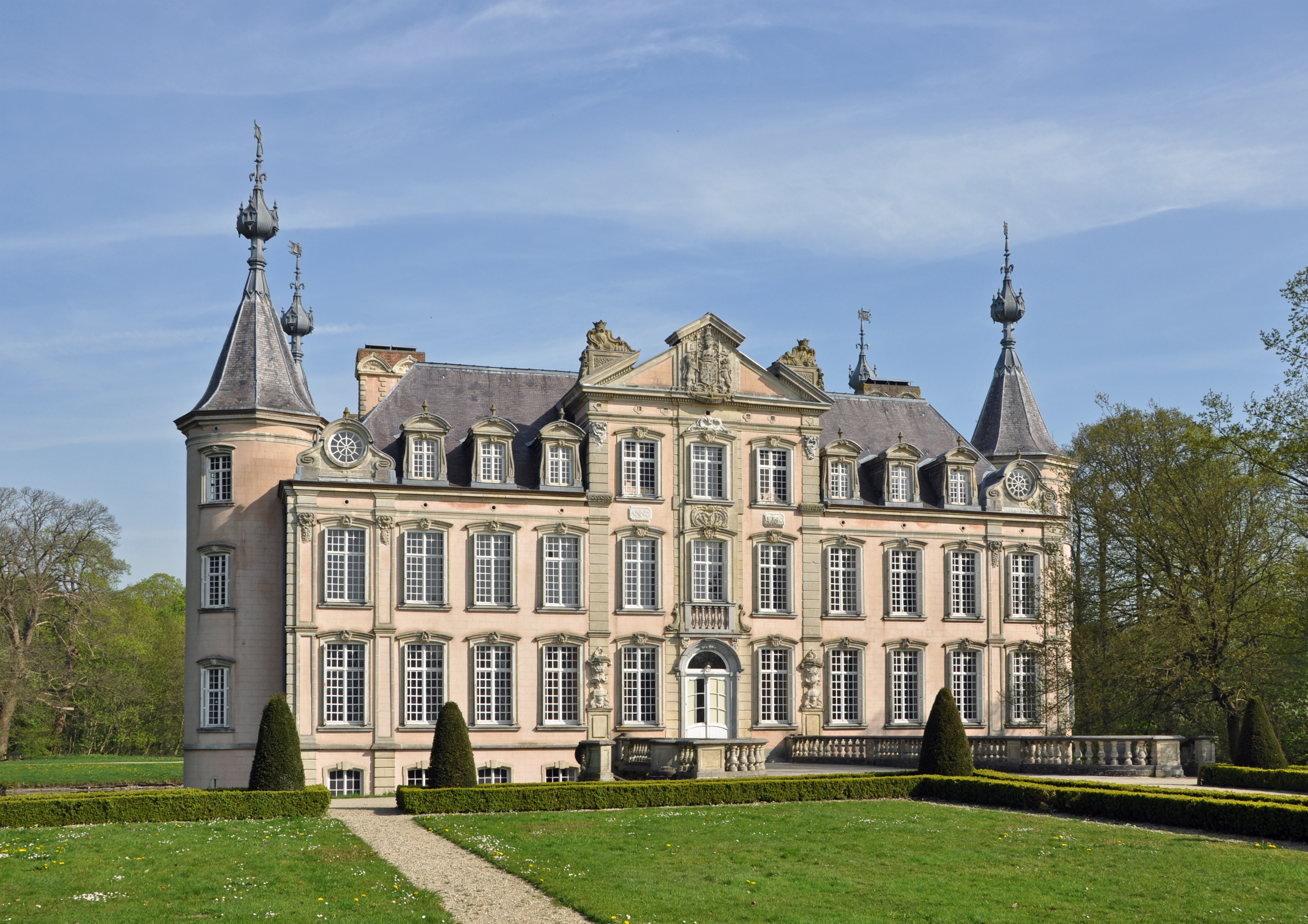
- Poeke Castle

Site information
- Type: Castle

Location
- Coordinates: 51.0412°N 3.4500°E

Poeke Castle (Dutch: Kasteel van Poeke, French: Château de Poucques) is a castle near Poeke, a small town in the municipality of Aalter in the Belgian province of East Flanders. The castle, standing in 56 hectares (140 acres) of park, is surrounded by water and is accessible through bridges at the front and rear of the building. Poeke Castle is situated at an elevation of 15 meters.

== History ==
=== Construction ===
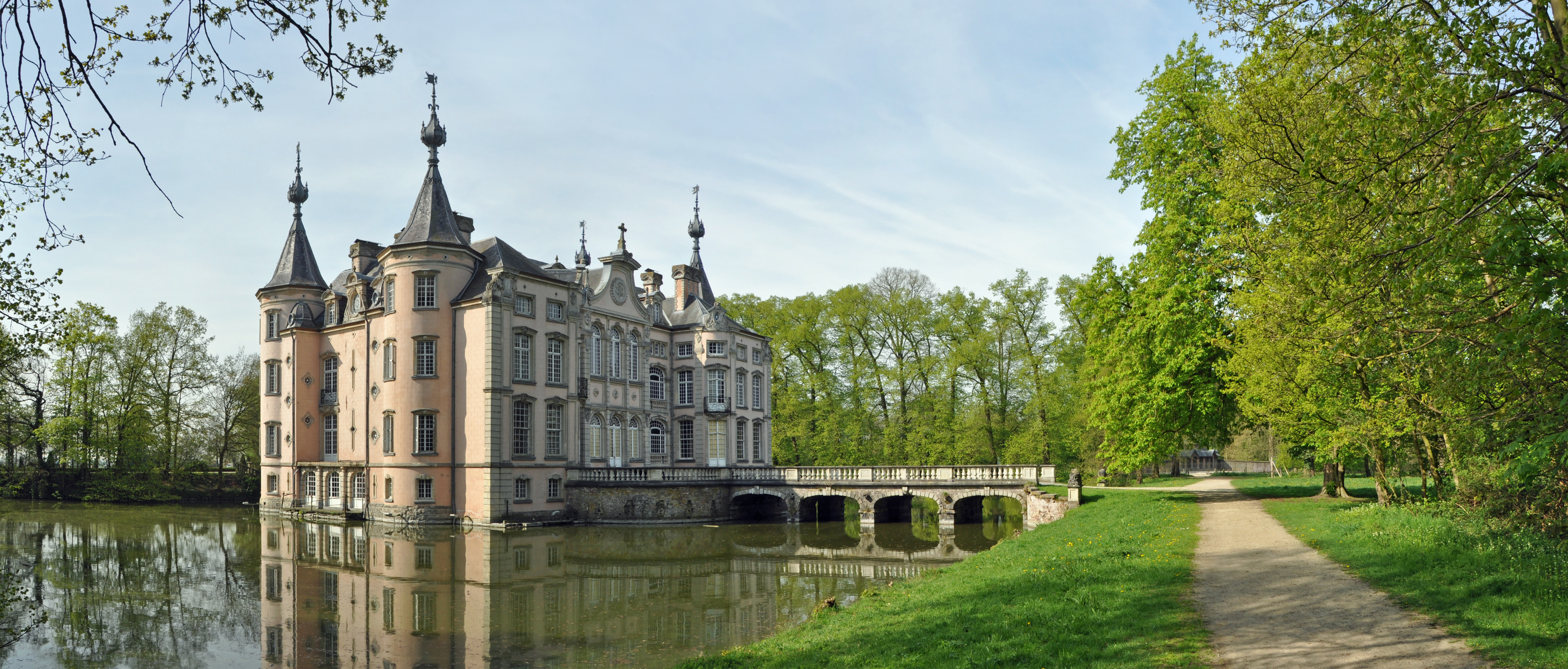
View from north-east

It is unknown when the first fortification was constructed at Poeke, but references to it appear from 1139 onwards. The castle played a prominent role during the conflict between Count Louis II of Flanders and the city of Ghent in 1382. In the same year Eulaard II of Poeke died at the battle of Beverhoutsveld when he attempted to stop the Ghent militia, who by then had already taken his fort.

The lords of Poeke were loyal vassals of the Counts of Flanders, with whom they also intermarried: Anastasia van Oultre, the second wife of Eulaard III of Poeke, for example, married as her second husband Robert of Flanders, illegitimate son of Louis II of Flanders.

=== Destruction ===
During the revolt of Ghent in 1452 against Philip the Good, the castle was taken by the Ghent militia. On 5 July 1452 Philip retook it, and had the Ghent militia present executed and the castle destroyed. The rebuilding most likely took over a century. After the death of Jan III of Poeke in 1563, the lordship became the possession of the de Mastaing family, distant relatives of the lords of Poeke. Jean de Jauche, lord of Mastaing, sold the lordship in 1588 to Philibert Delrye. His son Christoffel Delrye sold the lordship in 1597 to Jean de Preudhomme of Lille.

=== Rebuilding ===
Markus-Antonius de Preudhomme d'Hailly carried out rebuilding activities from 1658 to 1664, and in 1671. Whether these activities were effective is unknown, as sources from this period are lacking. Later, Charles Florent Idesbald de Preudhomme d'Hailly, Burgrave of Nieuwpoort, Oombergen, Sint-Lievens-Esse and Schoonbergen, Baron of Poeke and lord of Neuville, Kanegem and Velaine (1716–1792), carried out significant work on the castle between 1743 and 1752.

=== Pycke de Peteghem ===
In 1872, Baron Victor Pycke de Peteghem (1835–1875), from Oudenaarde, bought the estates. He immediately initiated rebuilding works that lasted until 1875. The third storey was integrated into a higher roof, and the interior and the gardens were renovated. There remain hardly any elements dating from before 1872. Additionally, the French garden was turned into an English garden.

The Baron's last descendant, burgemeester and Baroness Ines Pycke de Peteghem, was the last resident and owner of the castle. In her will, dated 1951, she bequeathed the entire estate to the charity Nationaal Werk der Katholieke Schoolkolonies ("National Work of Catholic School Colonies"), who came into possession of it after her death in 1955.

== Present day ==
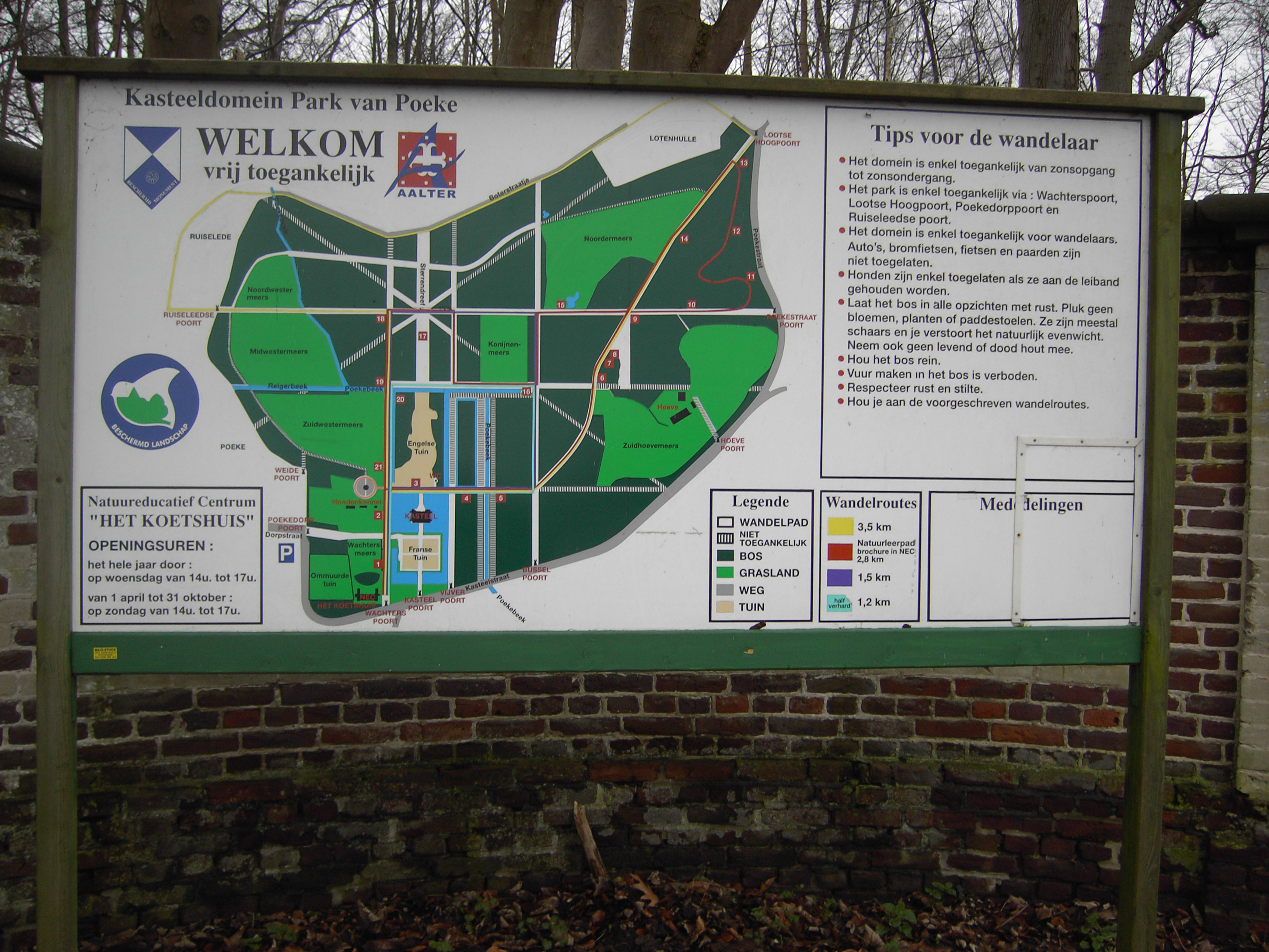
Map of the castle grounds

In 1977 the castle and its 56 ha park became the property of the municipality of Aalter, which now uses it for cultural meetings and festivities. It was used as a location for filming interior and exterior scenes for the 2012 BBC/HBO production of Parade's End.

Poeke Castle became an official national monument on 13 October 1943. The park was declared a protected landscape in 1978.

== See also ==
- List of castles in Belgium

== Sources ==
- Camerlinckx, Jan 2007: Het kasteel van Poeke. Eeklo: de Eeckloonaar
