= Flor Grammens =

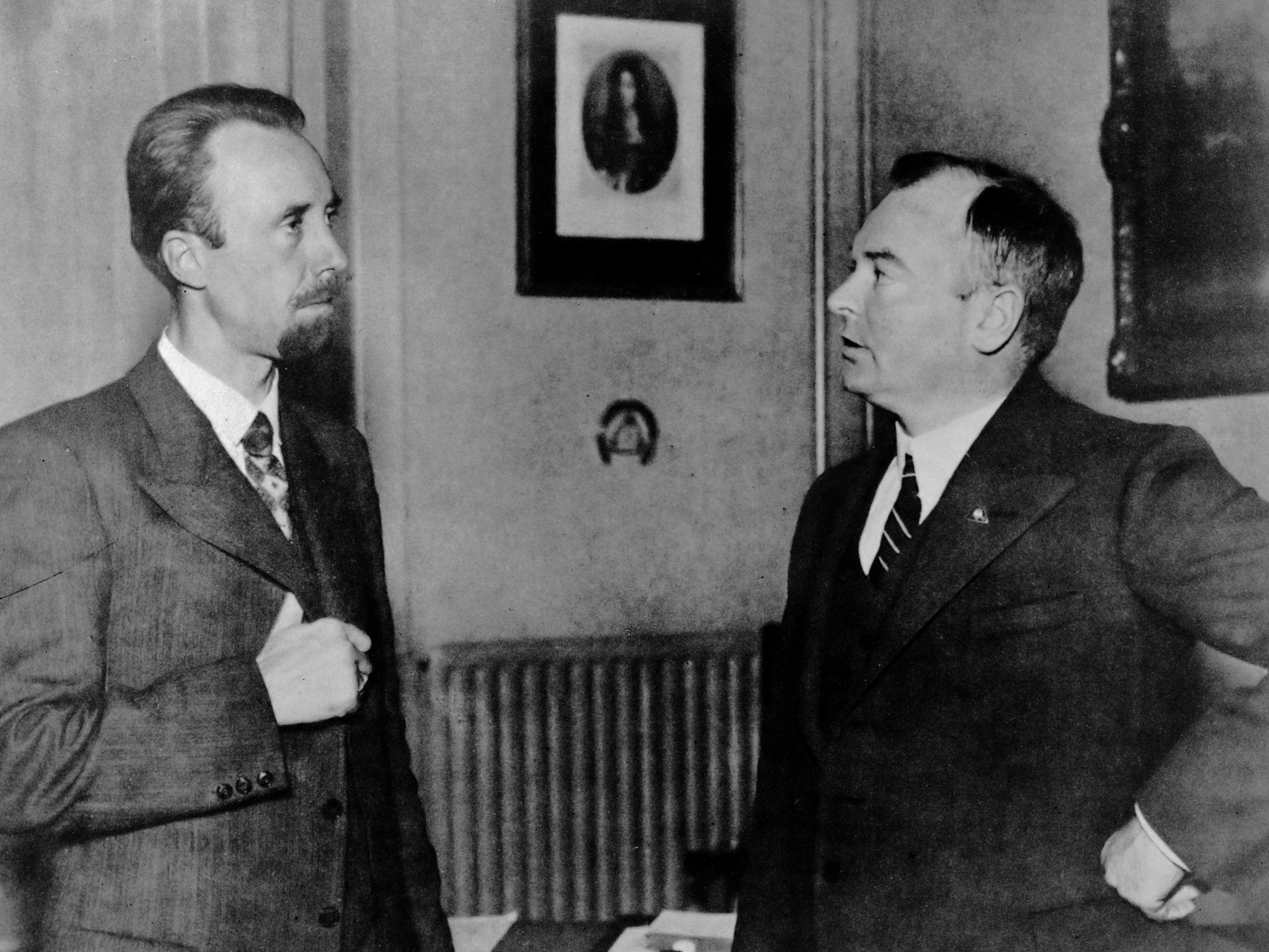
Flor Grammens and Anton Mussert (right) in 1940

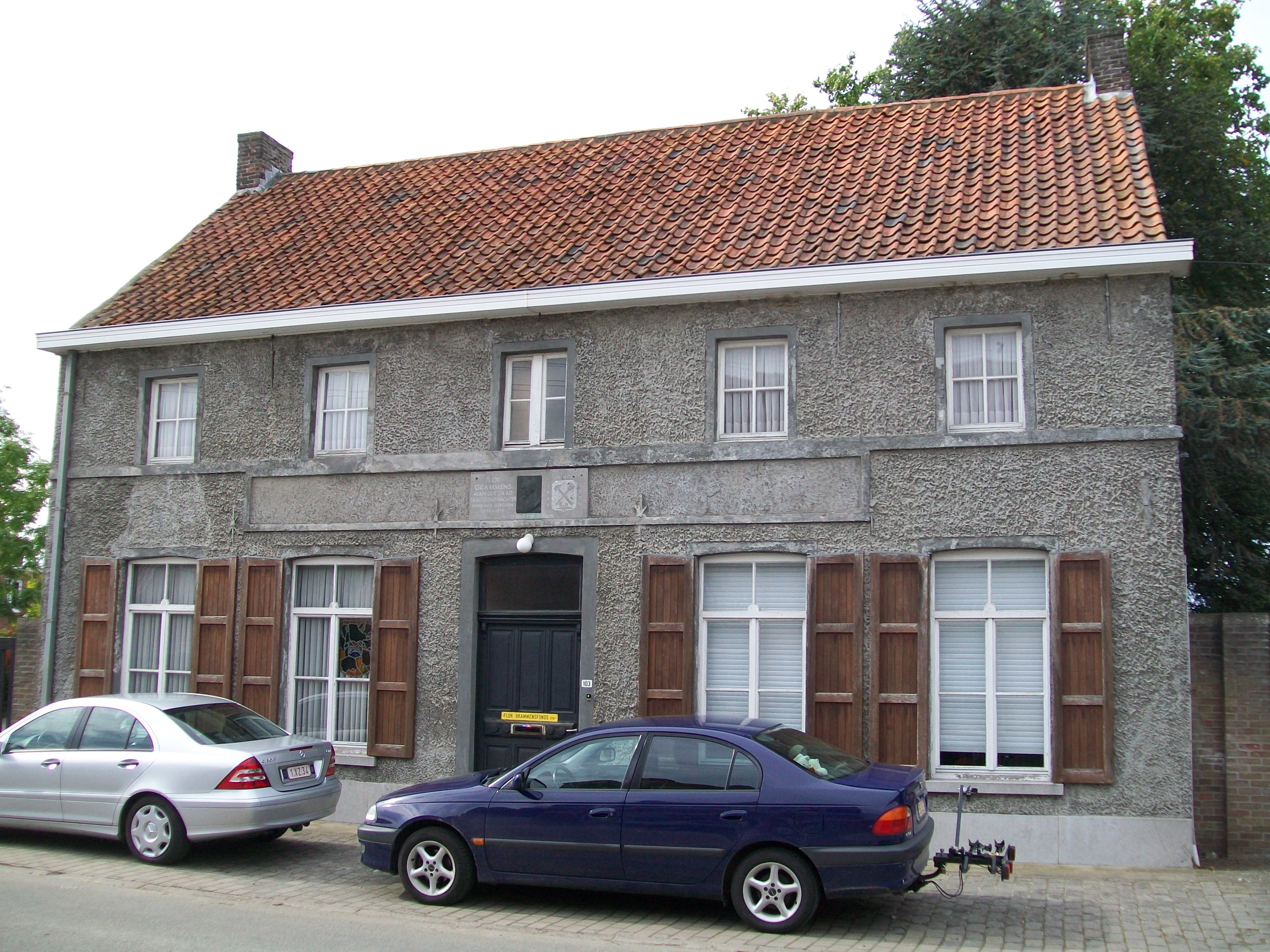
The house in Bellem where Grammens was born.

Florimond Grammens (born Bellem 13 April 1899: died Deinze, 28 March 1985), AKA Flor Grammens, was a Belgian politician and Flemish activist. He campaigned for Belgian language laws and the formalisation of the country's language frontier, legally establishing the dominance of Dutch in the north and French in the south.

== Upbringing and early career ==
Grammens was the son of a former police adjutant. In 1910 the family, including his father's two daughters, relocated the short distance to Aalter. Grammens attended the (then francophone) St Vincent College in Eeklo. Later, during the First World War, he attended the "Normal school" at Sint-Niklaas, from where he graduated in 1919 with a teaching diploma. He obtained a teaching position in Kortrijk, relocating to nearby Ronse which at this time was still a bilingual town.

He participated actively in the Davidsfonds at this time. This was an organisation dedicated to the promotion of the church, the Dutch language and Flemish identity. A shared concern over bilingualism in Ronse brought Gramens into contact with like-minded Flemish nationalists, notably Leo Vindevogel and former chairman of the Davidsfonds, Arthur Boon.

== Initial language activism ==
French had traditionally been the language of the ruling class throughout Belgium, but was the first language of the wider population only in the south.

At the request of van Boon, in 1926, Grammens gave a lecture to the Davidsfonds Congress on the subject of the language situation in Ronse and the surrounding district. This turned out to be the first of many lecture appearances that he would make in Flanders.

In 1927, Grammens undertook a walking tour along the full length of Belgium's east–west language frontier, researching the language situations in the places through which he travelled. In 1929, he started setting up local language action groups along the length of the language frontier, leading their discussions himself. In 1929 and 1930, he again undertook study tours along the length of the language frontier, now accompanied by August de Schryver who, at this time, was a parliamentary deputy for the Eeklo-Gent region and would go on to play a leading part in national Belgian politics for more than three decades.

Legislation promoted chiefly by francophone Wallonia had, in 1921, replaced widespread official bilingualism with public monolingualism linked to place. This was intended to preserve the French language in southern Belgium at a time when migration from the Dutch-speaking north was tending to increase Flemish cultural and linguistic representation in the francophone south.

From the Flemish side, Grammens campaigned to make Flanders monolingual, and endorsed the principal that public language use should be determined by where you lived rather than by individual preference. Starting in 1930, he headed up campaigning meetings, concentrating on places on the Flemish side of the language frontier. His campaigning proved influential, and 1932 saw new legislation affecting language use in education and government, while protecting the status of any minority language used by at least 30% of a local population. A provision in the legislation (which would be revoked effective 1962 by the Eyskens government) provided for a language census every ten years, which a municipality could use to mandate a change from French to Dutch (or vice versa) as its official language if there was a shift in the preferred language of the majority of the local population. Language legislation with respect to the courts followed in 1935.

== After the 1932 Language Law ==
After the 1932 law had been introduced, Grammens introduced the "Taalgrenswacht", a monthly publication intended to inform people about the new arrangements. During the incumbency (between 1936 and 1937) of Interior Minister De Schrijver, a commission was established, chaired by another national politician, Limburg-born Camille Huysmans, to perform the necessary preparatory work for the official establishment of the language frontier. However, politicians were focused on trying to secure national economic revival at this time and the Language Law commission's progress was, at best, slow, persuading Grammens to campaign more spectacularly for the timely implementation of the Language Laws.

== A direct approach ==
From January 1937, Grammens started to personally over-write French language government communications, such as street signs. The first of these ventures took place in Edingen, a Flemish frontier municipality in Hainut Province. Grammens concentrated his campaign on municipalities where the linguistic mix of the population required special provision to be made for minority language speakers representing more than 30% of the total population. These were, in practice, mostly located near to the Franco-Flemish language frontier, and are the municipalities which today are recognised as "Faciliteitengemeente" (Municipalities with language facilities). By 1937, the Language Law required government communications such as road signs to be written in both French and Dutch, but at this time the road signs in these places were written only in French.

== In the rest of Flanders ==
Grammens received both acclaim and active support from Flemish student movements. In February 1937, he switched his concentration to municipalities in the Flemish heartland which had no substantial francophone minority and which therefore, under the provisions of the Language Law, should be monolingual. In a single night, the French language roadside signs in more than 200 municipalities were overpainted. This spectacular demonstration triggered renewed comment in both the national Chamber and the Senate. These actions were in part funded by the "Grammensfonds", an association set up for this purpose in 1938.

These activities continued until 1939, not without results. The overpainting of francophone signs took place in Ghent four times, before the group changed tactics and simply smashed all the offending signs. A week later the town hall adopted the monolingual position (as they had been legally required to do ever since the relevant legislation had been enacted in 1932) and withdrew legal proceedings against the Flemish language activists.

During this period, Grammens frequently found himself in court, and even served some brief prison sentences. In January 1938, students stormed the prison in Belgium's oldest town, Tongeren, in an attempt to free Grammens from incarceration. Another attempt to free him a year later, this time from the prison in Oudenaarde, also failed. On 3 July 1938, several tens of thousands of organised supporters demonstrated in Ghent, demanding Grammens' release from the prison there. Many of the students involved in these protests were later themselves prominent in Belgian politics.

== Post-war activism ==
Grammens spent the immediate post-war years in prison, his wartime priorities having led him to be viewed as a collaborator. During the 1958 Universal Exhibition in Brussels, an event where French seemed in many ways preferred over Dutch, Grammans protested together with the Flemish Peoples' Movement against the francophone character of the event. Grammens found himself arrested again and was convicted due to his involvement in throwing "bitumen eggs" (pekeieren) at the French pavilion.

Later he was involved in founding the Language Action Committee.
