= Aalter =

- Municipality
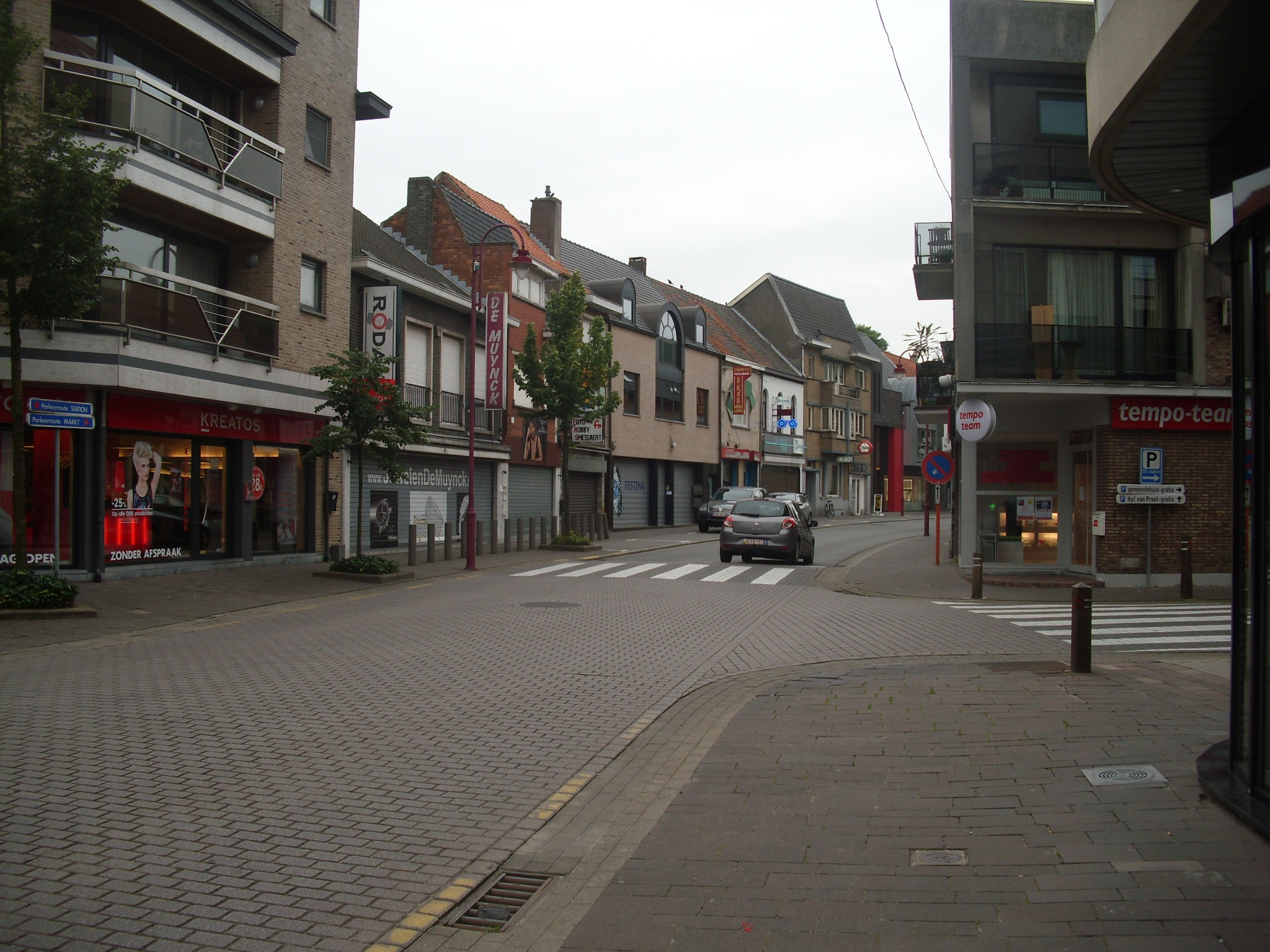

- Flag Coat of arms

- Location of Aalter in East Flanders
- Interactive map of Aalter
- Location in Belgium
- Coordinates: 51°05′N 03°27′E
- Country: Belgium
- Community: Flemish Community
- Region: Flemish Region
- Province: East Flanders
- Arrondissement: Ghent

Government
  - Mayor: Mathias Van de Walle (CD&V)
  - Governing party: CD&V/N-VA

Area
  - Total: 119.85 km^{2} (46.27 sq mi)

Population (2022-01-01)
  - Total: 29,340
  - Density: 244.8/km^{2} (634.0/sq mi)
- Postal codes: 9880, 9881, 9910
- NIS code: 44084
- Area codes: 09
- Website: www.aalter.be

Aalter (Dutch pronunciation: [ˈaːltər]) is a municipality located between Bruges and Ghent in the Belgian province of East Flanders. The municipality comprises the towns of Aalter, Bellem, Lotenhulle, Poeke, Knesselare and Ursel. It is bordered on the north by Maldegem, on the east by Zomergem and Nevele, on the south by Deinze, and on the west by the province of West Flanders. The mayor is Pieter De Crem.

Effective 1 January 2019, the municipality of Knesselare was merged into Aalter. Aalter was home to 29,242 people in 2021.

== History ==
Aalter is located on the border of the Meetjesland with the forest of Flanders. The area has been inhabited since prehistory. Artefacts have been recovered from 3,000 to 2,000 BC. The village was first mentioned in 974 as "Villa Haleftra". The etymology is unclear. The current name started to emerge around 1700. Aalter was home to several small heerlijkheden (landed estates), some of which had motte-and-bailey castles.

Between 1613 and 1623, the Ghent-Bruges Canal was dug, and several fortifications were built by the Spanish against the Dutch. In 1838, a railway station opened and Aalter started to develop into a town which nowadays has many commuters.

== Gallery ==
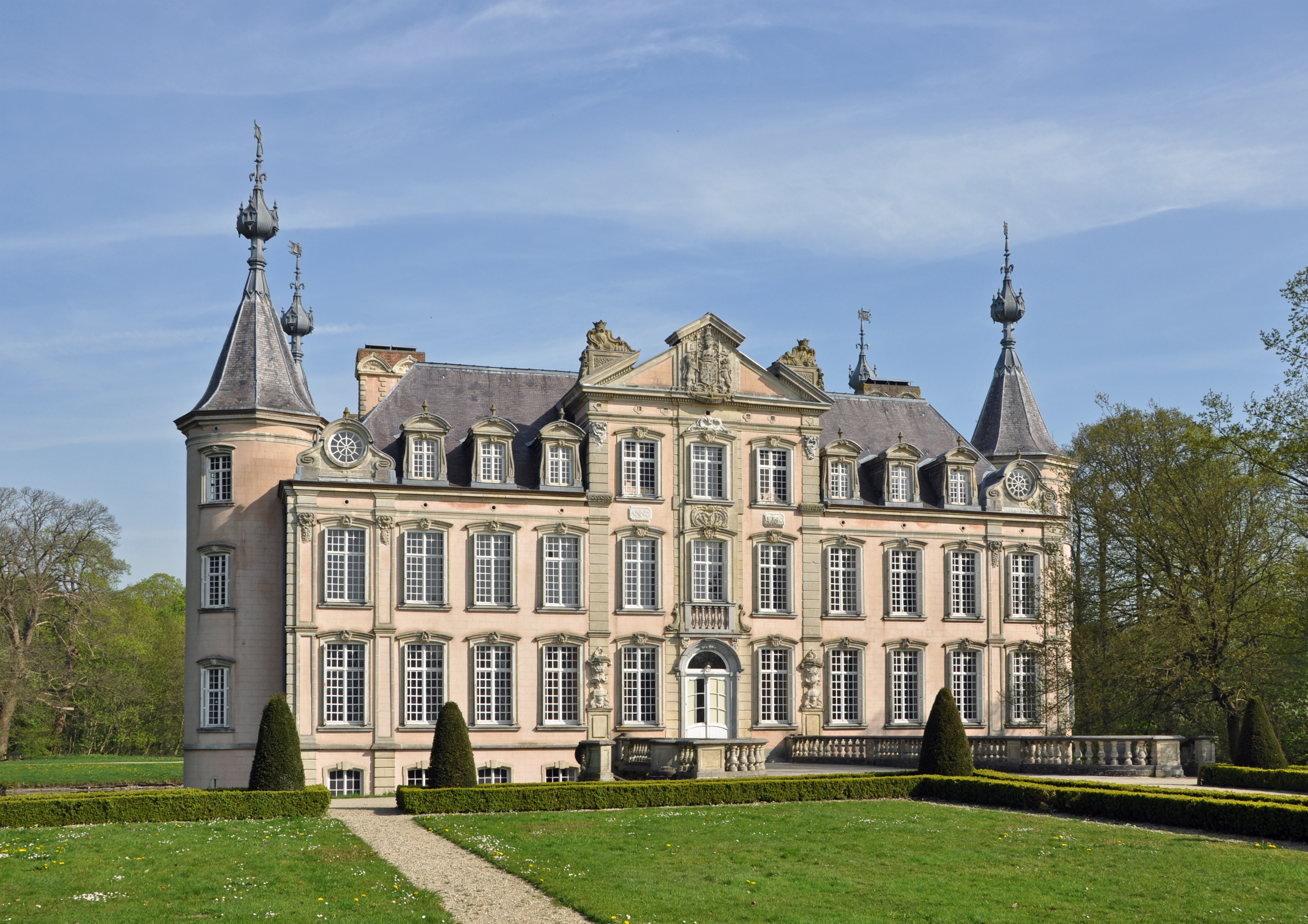
Poeke Castle

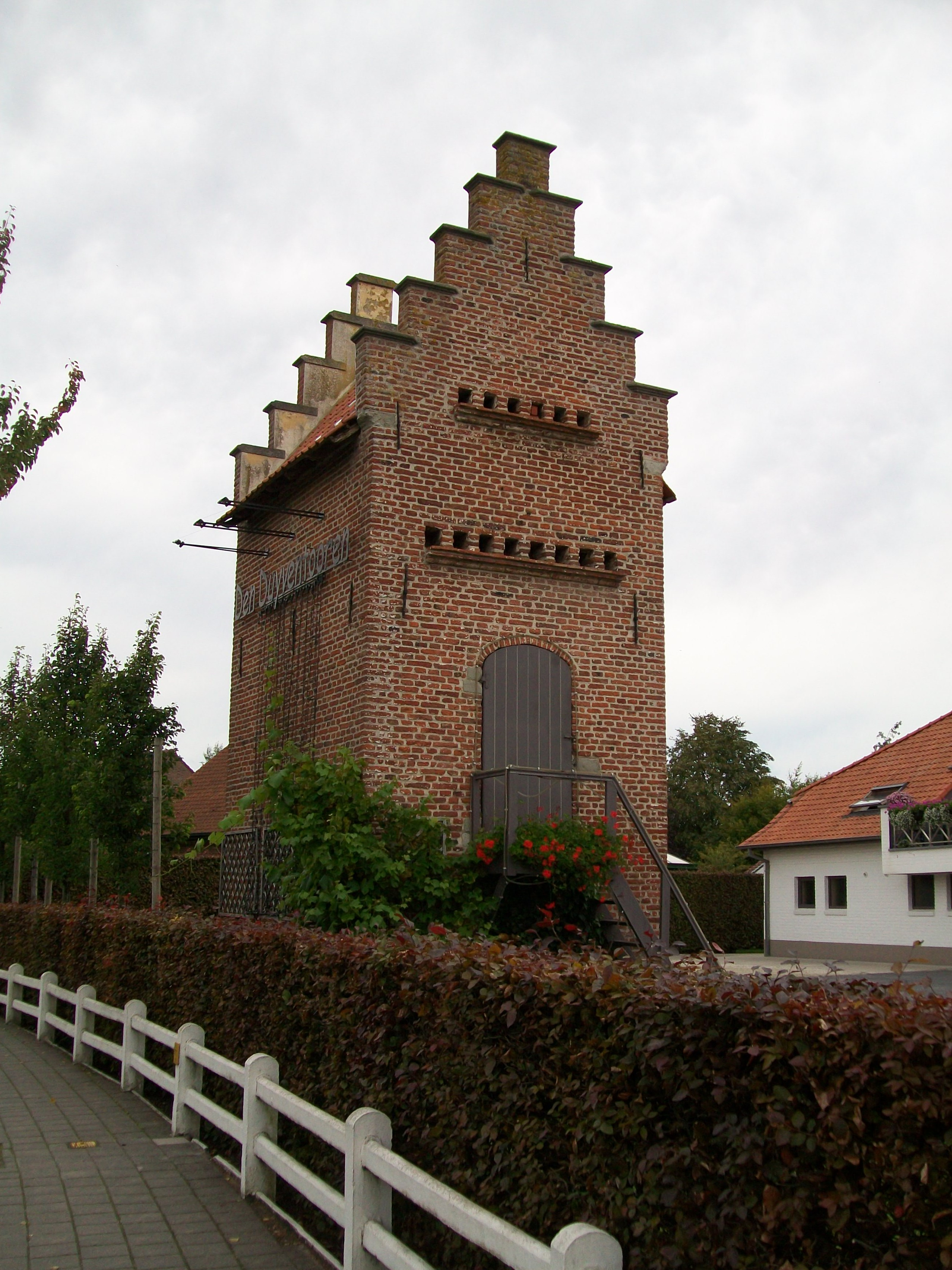
Pigeon-tower in Bellem

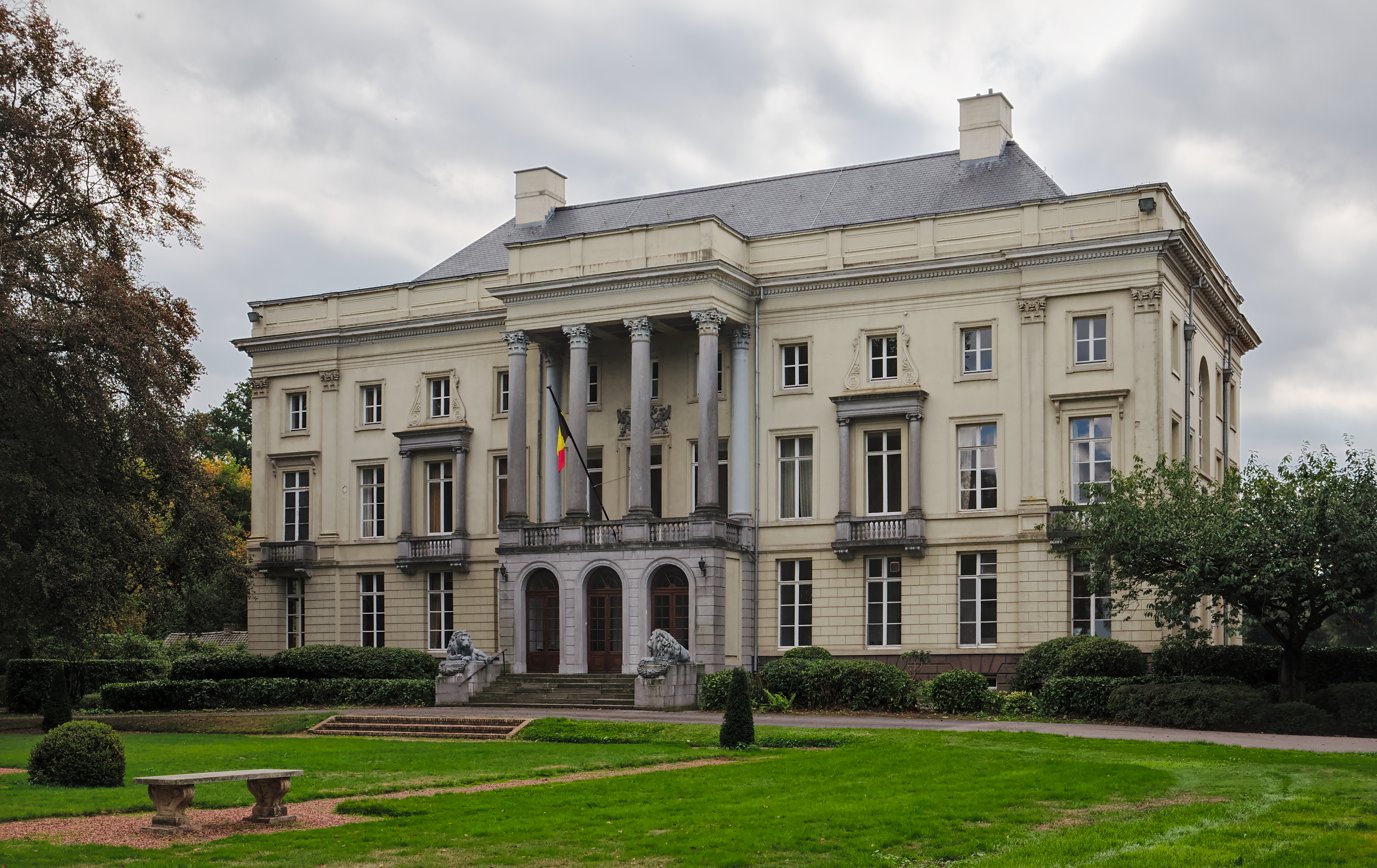
Mariahove castle in Bellem

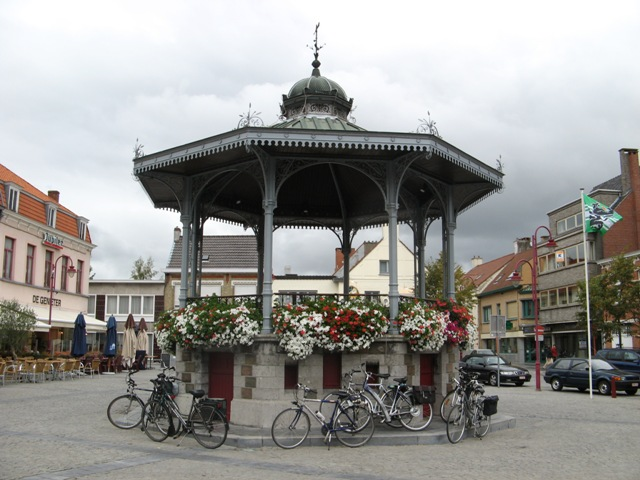
Bandstand in the square

== See also ==
- Pieter De Crem
- Flor Grammens
