= Knesselare =

- Deelgemeente
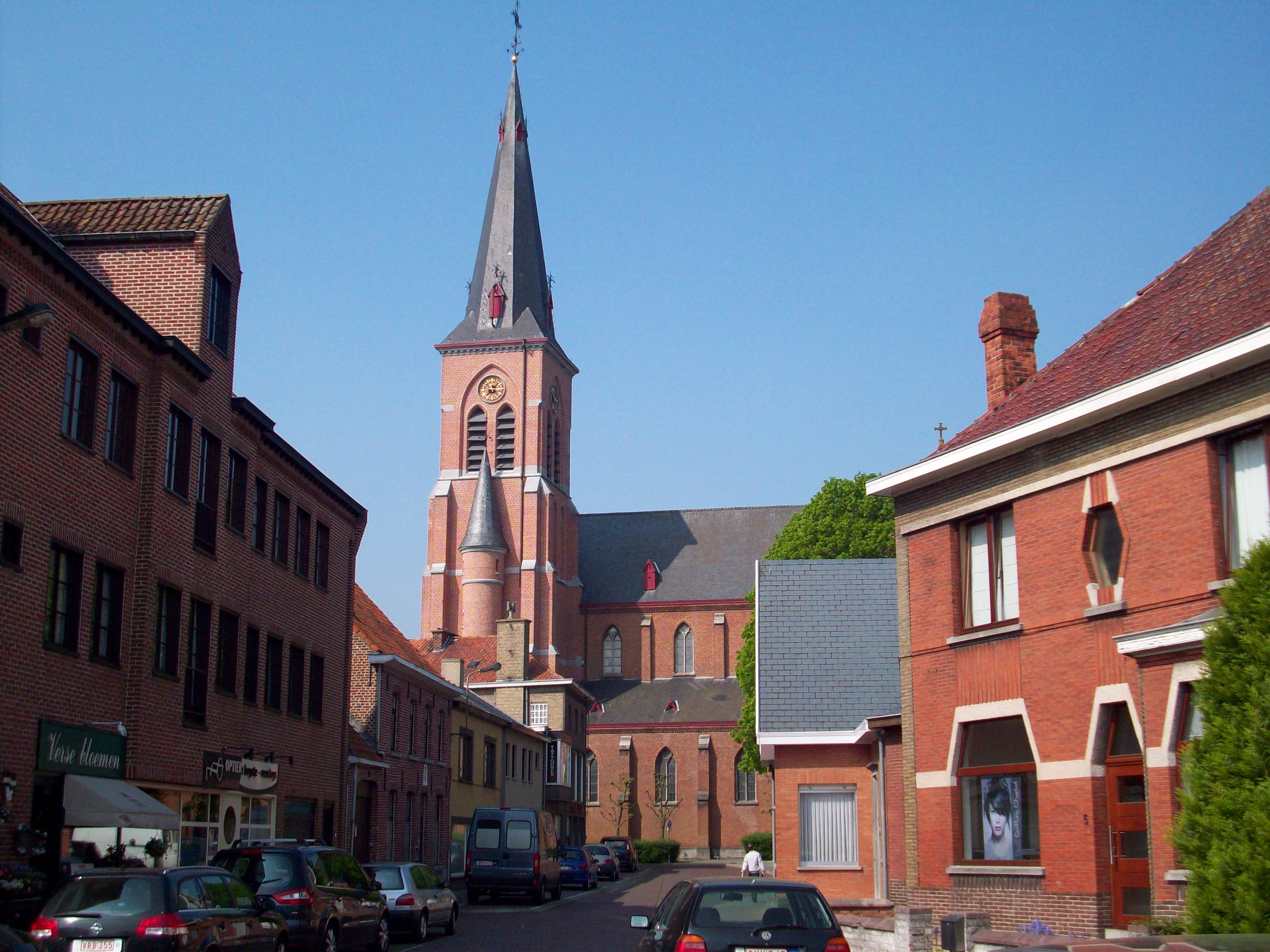
- Town centre and Saint Willibrord Church

- Flag Coat of arms

- Location within Belgium
- Coordinates: 51°08′N 03°25′E
- Country: Belgium
- Province: East Flanders
- Arrondissement: Ghent
- Municipality: Aalter

Area
  - Total: 37.45 km^{2} (14.46 sq mi)

Population (2021)
  - Total: 8,211
  - Density: 219.3/km^{2} (567.9/sq mi)
- Postal code: 9910
- Area code: 09
- Website: www.knesselare.be

Knesselare (Dutch pronunciation: [ˈknɛsəˌlaːrə]) is a village and deelgemeente in the municipality of Aalter and a former municipality located in the Belgian province of East Flanders. The municipality comprised the towns of Knesselare proper and Ursel.

The municipality's name is derived from the Germanic words "klisse" (herb) and "laar", (a soggy brushwood terrain), and was first attested in 1128.

Knesselare became an independent parish in 1171. It was originally a village heerlijkheid, but during the rule of Louis II, Count of Flanders (1330–1384), the area had been split into four different administrations. Until the 19th century, large parts of the municipality still contains forests and heaths.

On 1 August 2015, Knesselare had a total population of 8,171. The total area was 37.27 km² which gives a population density of 219 inhabitants per km².

Effective 1 January 2019, the municipality was merged into Aalter.

== Gallery ==
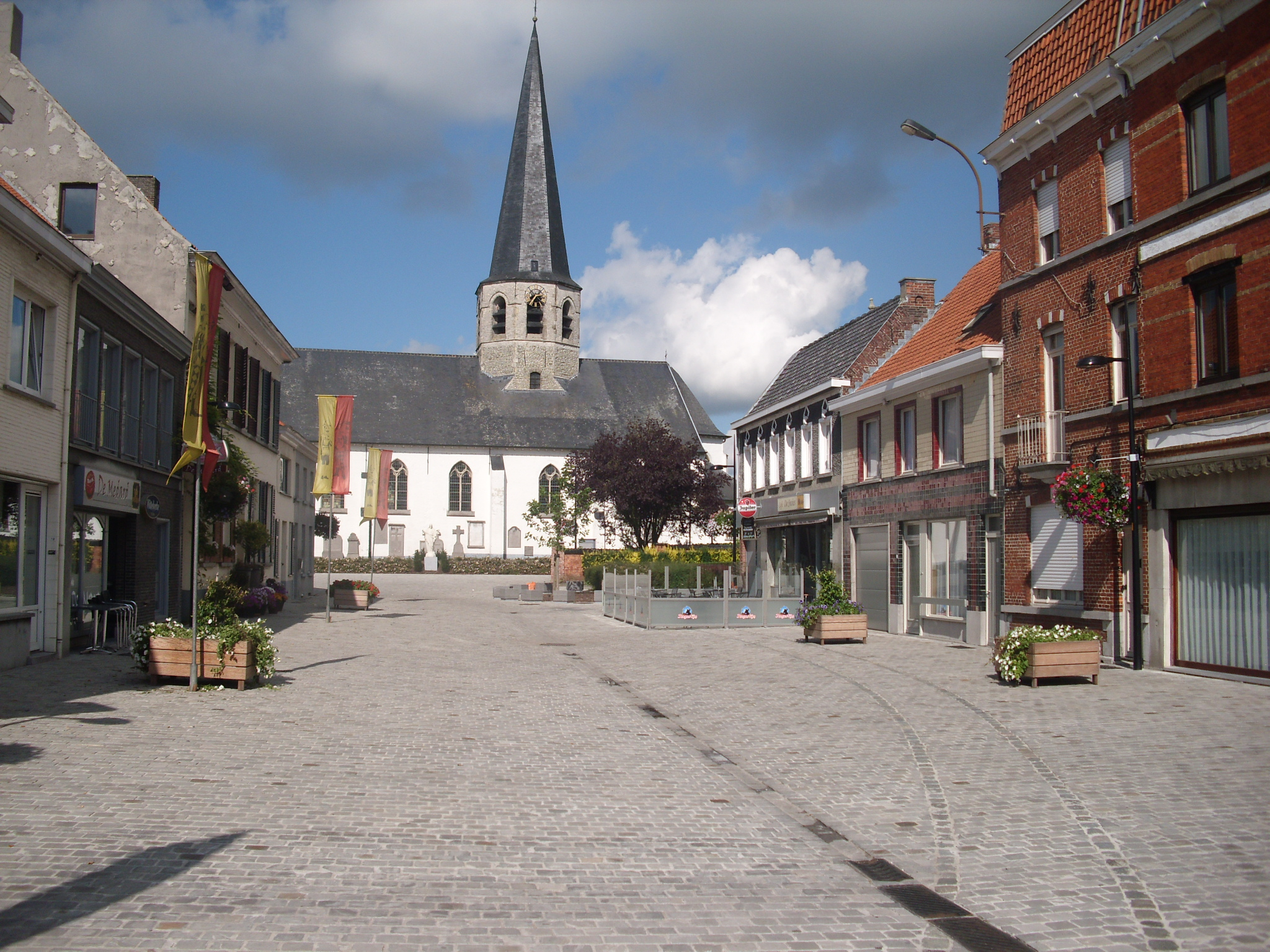
Ursel village center

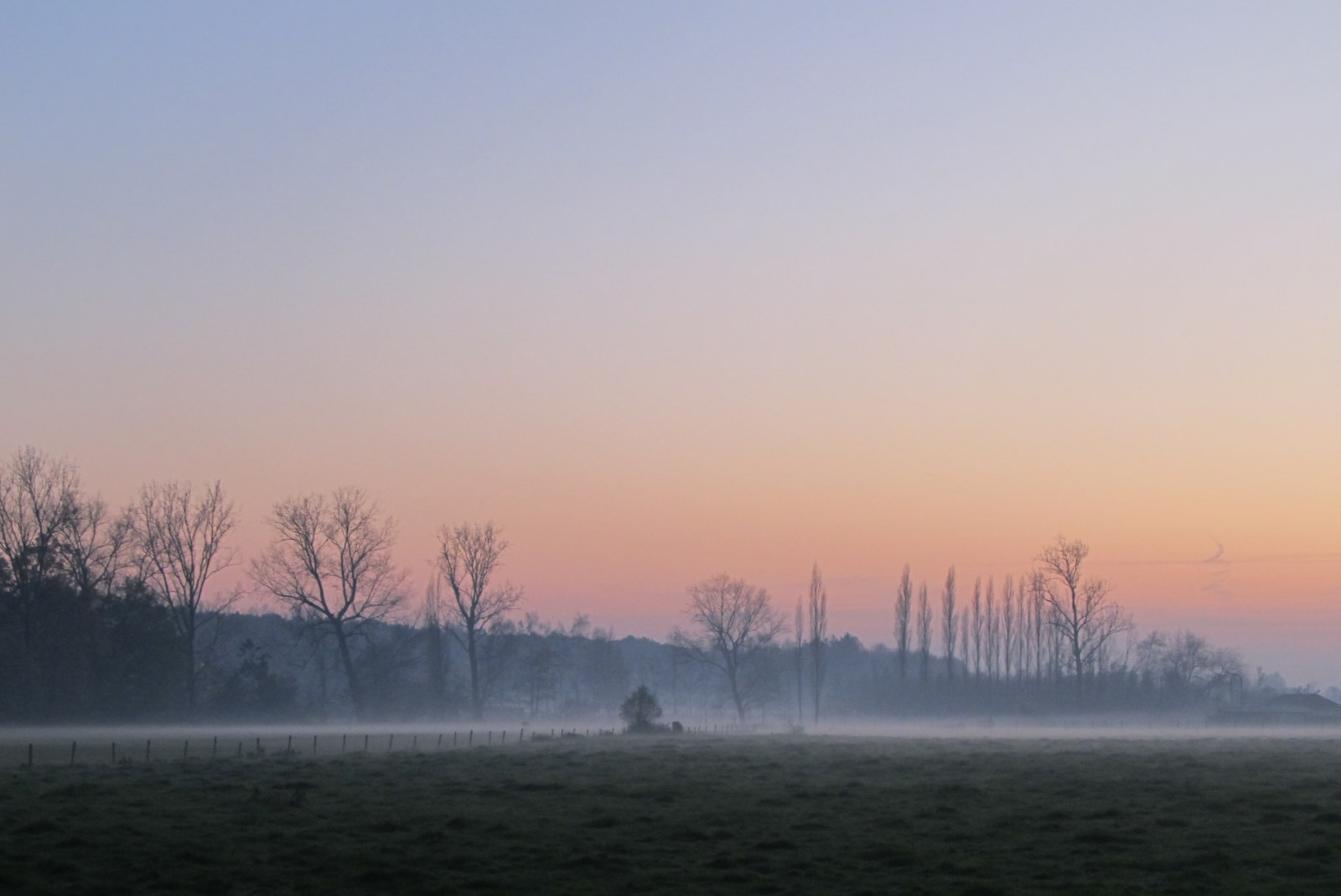
The Drongengoedbos at dawn

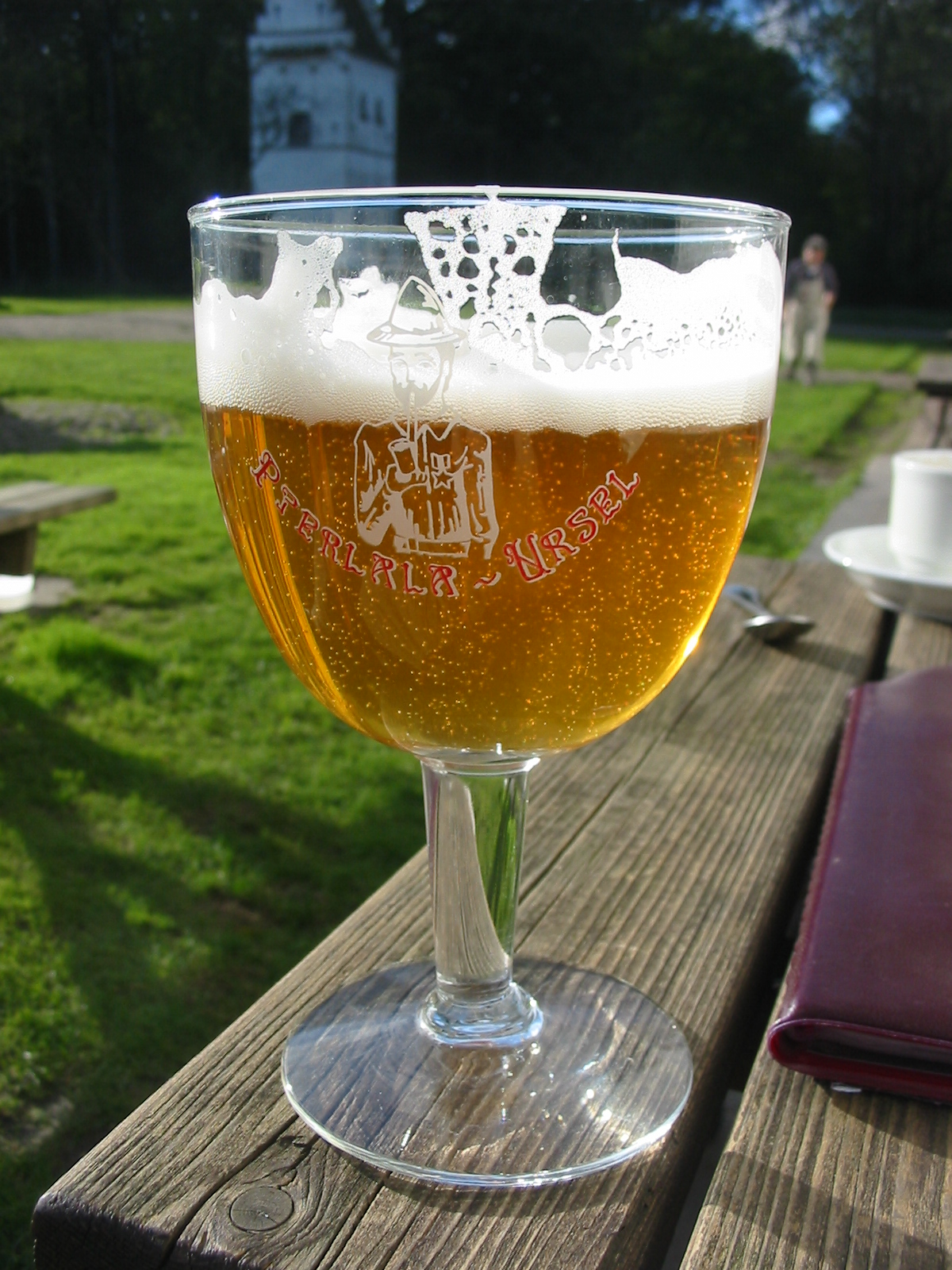
Pierlala beer
