= Bellem =

- Village
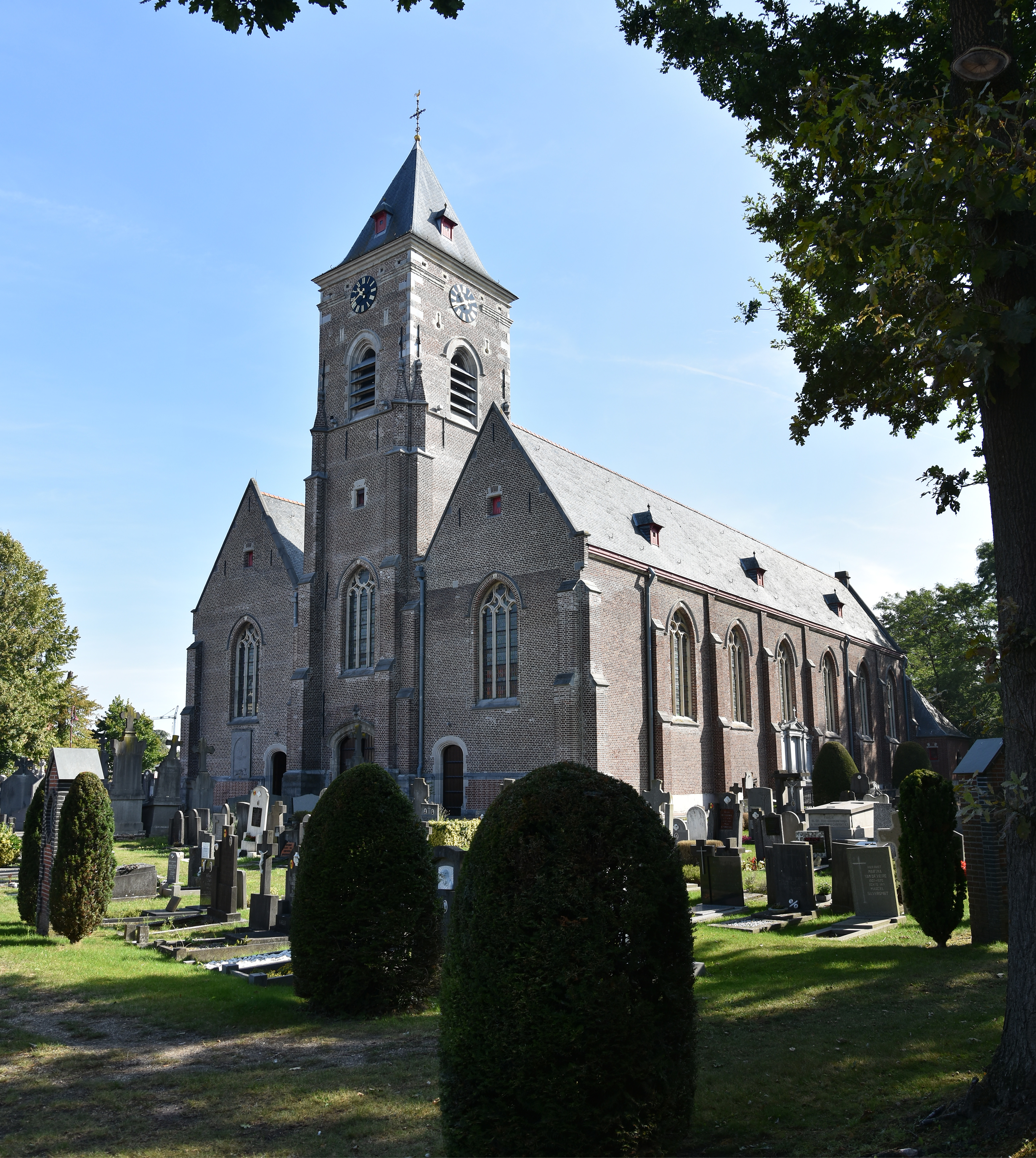
- Onze-Lieve-Vrouw Geboorte Church

- Coat of arms

- Location in Belgium
- Coordinates: 51.0900°N 3.4902°E
- Country: Belgium
- Province: East Flanders
- Municipality: Aalter

Area
  - Total: 12.29 km^{2} (4.75 sq mi)

Population (2021)
  - Total: 2,240
  - Density: 182/km^{2} (472/sq mi)
- Time zone: CET

Bellem is a village and deelgemeente (sub-municipality) in the municipality of Aalter in the Belgian province of East Flanders. The village was originally called Bethlehem. Bellem is located about 16 kilometres (9.9 mi) west of Ghent.

== History ==
The parish Bellem was founded around 1240 as Bethlehem. It was first mentioned as Bellem in 1291. The village was a heerlijkheid, but used to contain five enclaves containing farms belonging to Schuurvelde. In 1577, Bellem and Schuurvelde were merged into a single heerlijkheid. Around 1650, a castle was built, and Bellem was elevated to barony in 1655.

Between 1613 and 1623, the Ghent-Bruges Canal was dug and two forts were constructed by the Spanish near Bellem. This resulted in frequent attacks first by the Dutch Republic and from 1648 onwards by France. The arrival of the railway and later the motorway E40 did not result in significant growth, and Belem remained a rural agricultural village.

== Buildings and sights ==
The Onze-Lieve-Vrouw Geboorte Church is a three aisled church without transepts with a built-in tower. The original church was built in the second half of the 16th century, and the lower part of the tower is still original. In 1847 and between 1870 and 1874, the church was enlarged and received its current shape. The church burnt down on 10 September 1944 and was rebuilt in 1950 according to its original design.

Mariahoeve Castle was originally an estate of the Lord of Bellem and Schuurvelde. Around 1650, a castle was built. The castle had turned to ruin by the mid 18th century. In 1808, the domain was bought by the industrialist Jacob Lieven van Caneghem who rebuilt the castle in 1815. The building was redesigned in neoclassic style between 1855 and 1860. In 1963, the castle was bought by the congregations of Sisters of the Diocese of Ghent who use it as a retirement home and have renamed the castle Mariahove.

== Notable people ==
- Flor Grammens (1899–1985), politician and Flemish activist

== Gallery ==
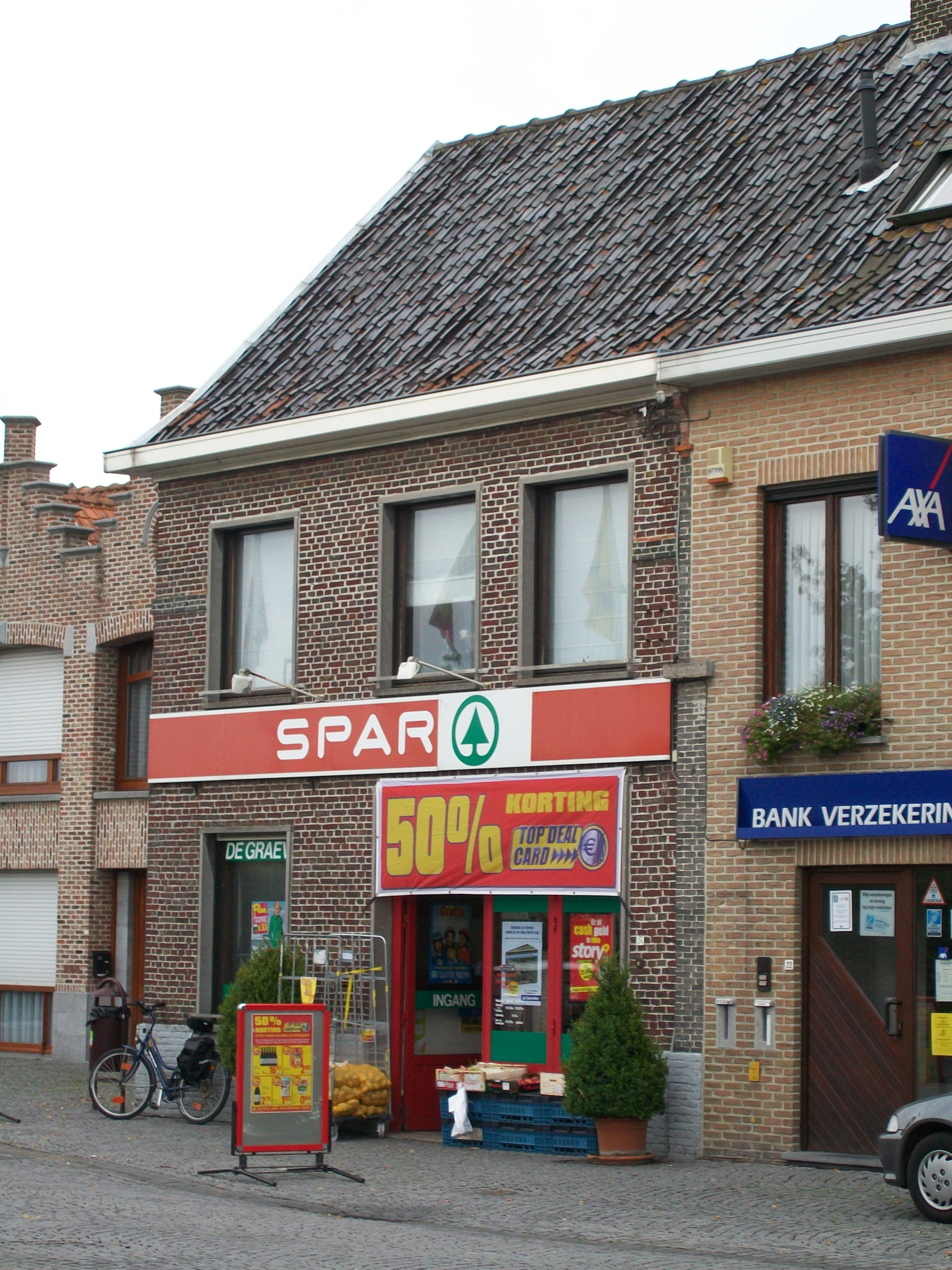
Little supermarket

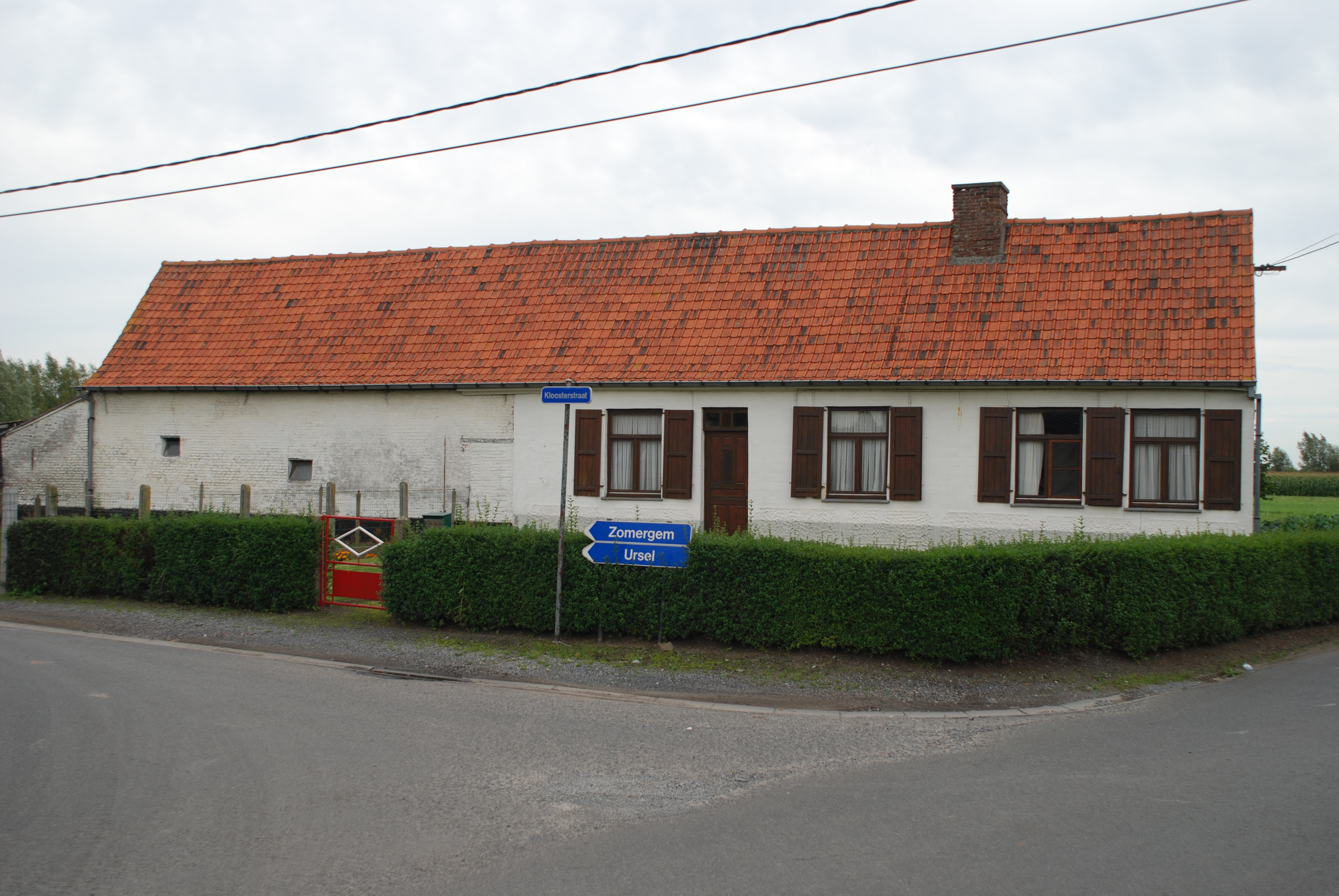
Farm in Bellem

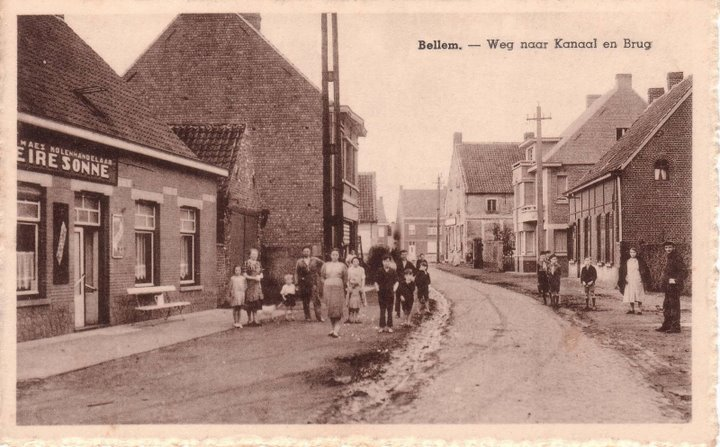
Old postcard (before 1940)

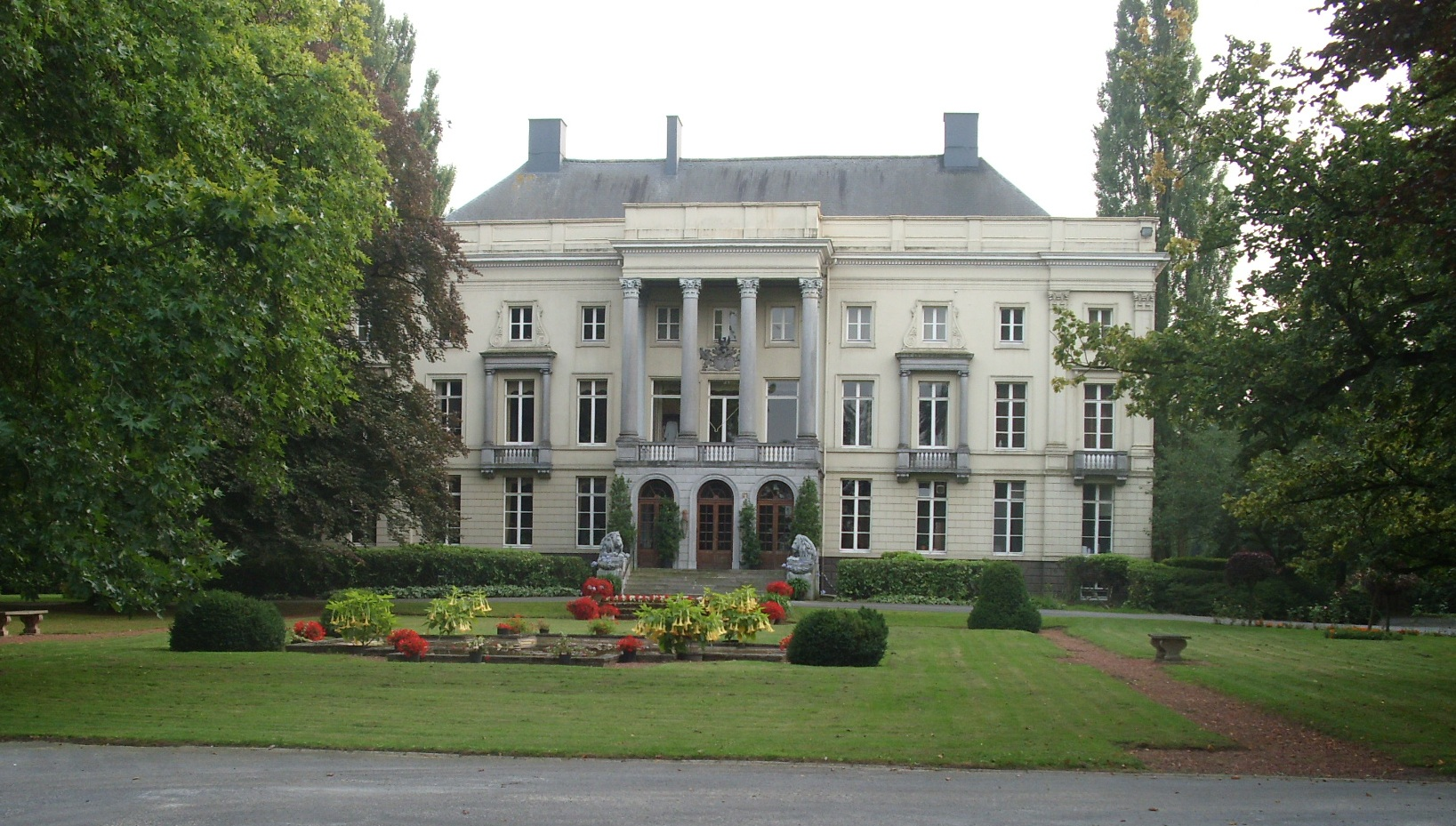
Mariahoeve Castle
