= Poeke =

Village in Belgium

Coordinates: 51°02′27″N 3°26′40″E

Location of Poeke

Coat of arms

Poeke is a village in the Belgian province of East Flanders and is a submunicipality of Aalter. It was an independent municipality until the municipal reorganization of 1977. Poeke is located on the border between Zandig Vlaanderen and Zandlemig Vlaanderen. It is located withinin the triangle Tielt-Deinze-Aalter.

North of the village centre runs the Poekebeek river, a tributary of the Durme, situated in a shallow depression between Aalter and the sandy loam plateau of Tielt.

Poeke was first mentioned in 1139, as Pocirca, with its name derived from the Poekebeek.

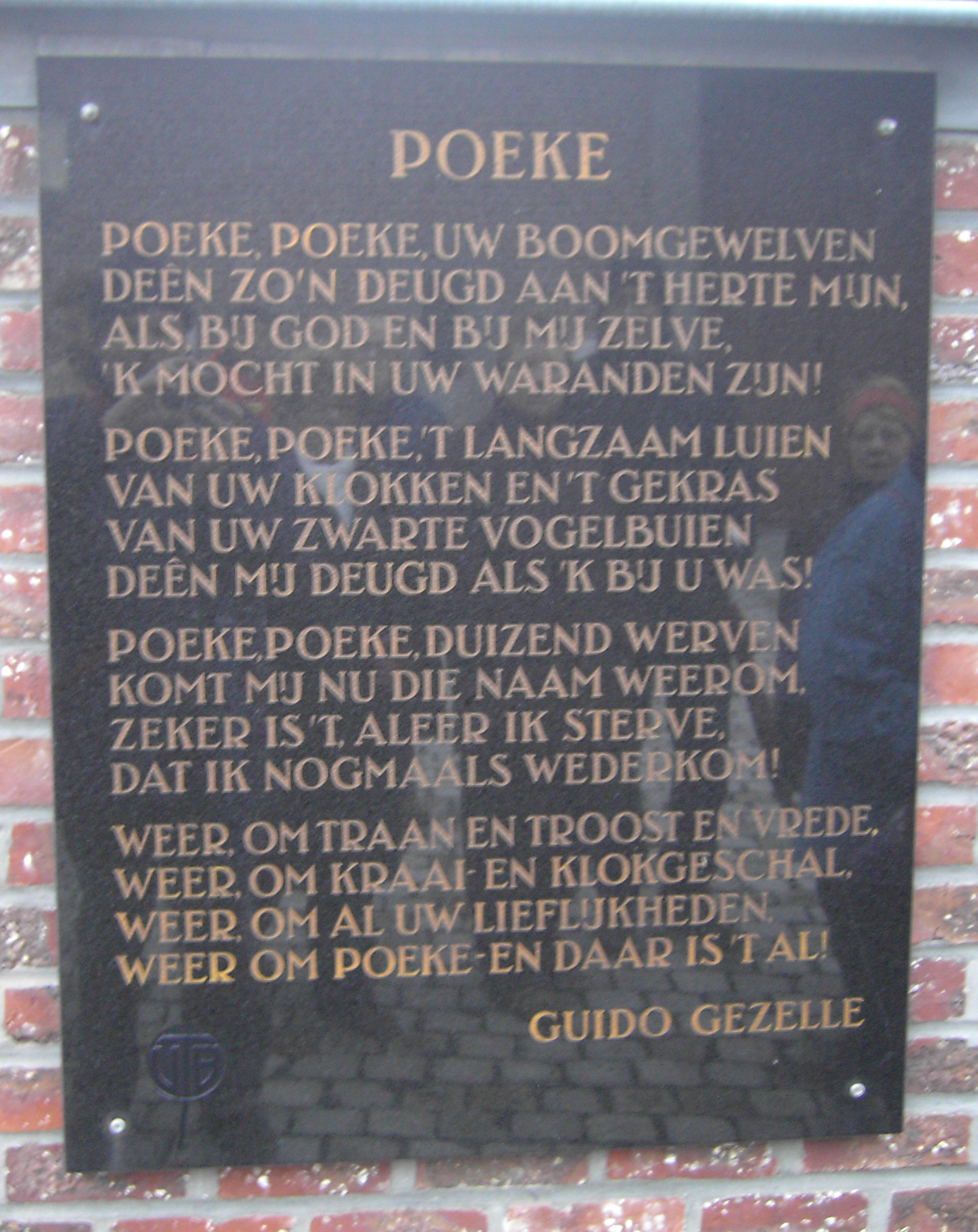
Poem by Guido Gezelle about Poeke

The West Flemish poet Guido Gezelle regularly visited Poeke. He stayed at the local monastery, where he wrote poems including one about Poeke around 1857. The tree under which he wrote poems is named after Gezelle and is a protected monument since 2010. Also a street in Poeke is named after Gezelle.
