= Taal Aktie Komitee =

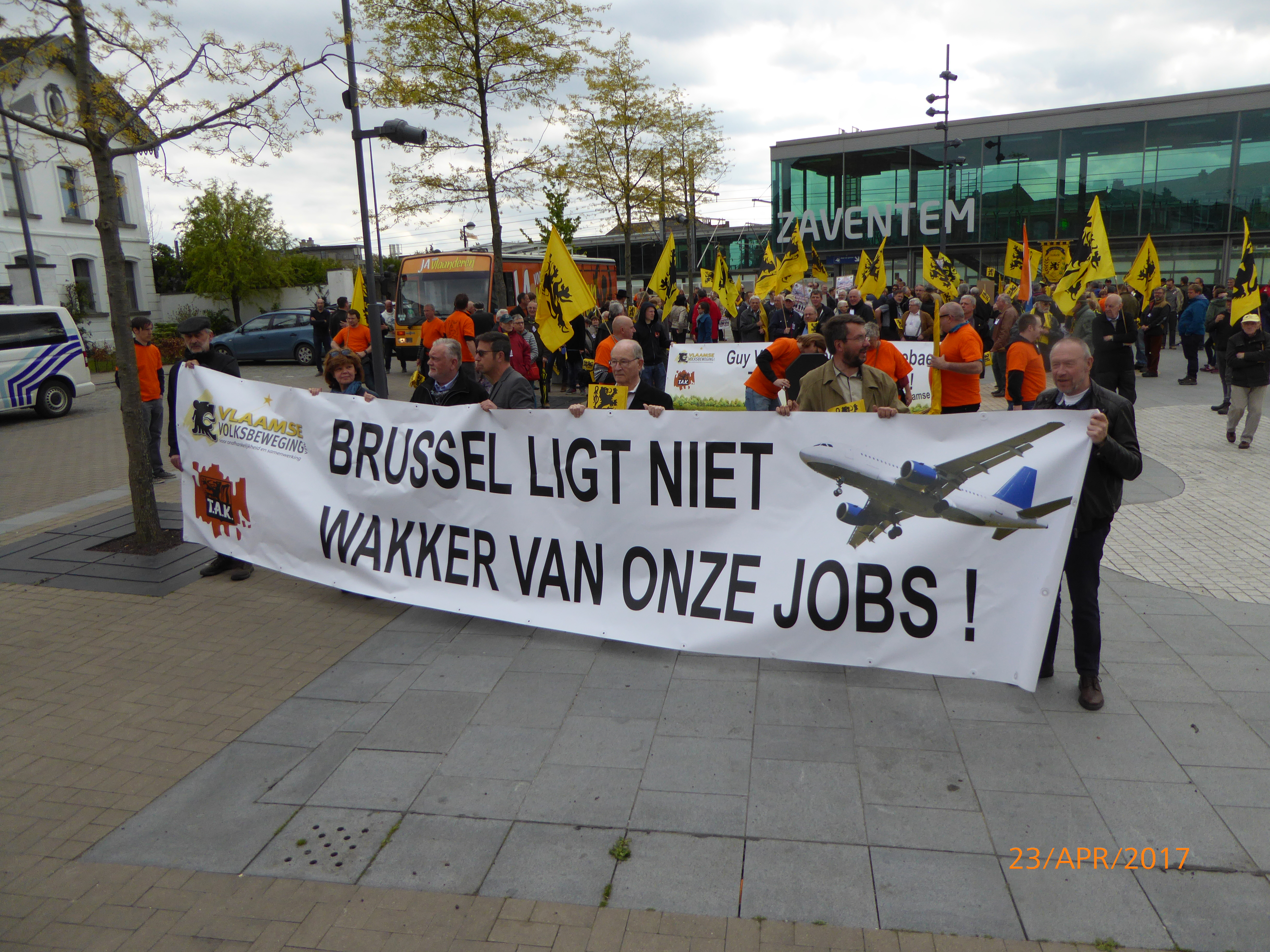

The Taal Aktie Komitee (Dutch; Language Action Committee), known by its acronym TAK, is a Flemish nationalist organisation in Belgium, founded in 1972. It claims to strive for the "preservation of the Flemish nature of the Flemish villages at the language border and in the Brussels Periphery". It also claims to wish to prevent the further Francization of Brussels and its periphery, and advocates the partition of Belgium along language lines.

TAK has taken part in protests and conflicts such as those in Voeren and Sint-Genesius-Rode, and occasionally interrupts municipal council meetings in municipalities, for example where it believes that the mayor has breached language laws.

Outside Belgium, the group also cooperated in 2002 with the Dutch Stichting Taalverdediging, protesting against monolingual English signage at the Amsterdam Airport Schiphol, and in favour of the reintroduction of Dutch-language signage at the airport.

== See also ==
- Flemish Movement
