= Van Damme (distillery) =

Gin distillery in Belgium

Coordinates: 50.9287°N 3.8058°E

Van Damme Jenever Distillery is an agricultural distillery in the Issegem hamlet of Balegem, a sub-municipality of Oosterzele in the Belgian province of East Flanders.

== History ==
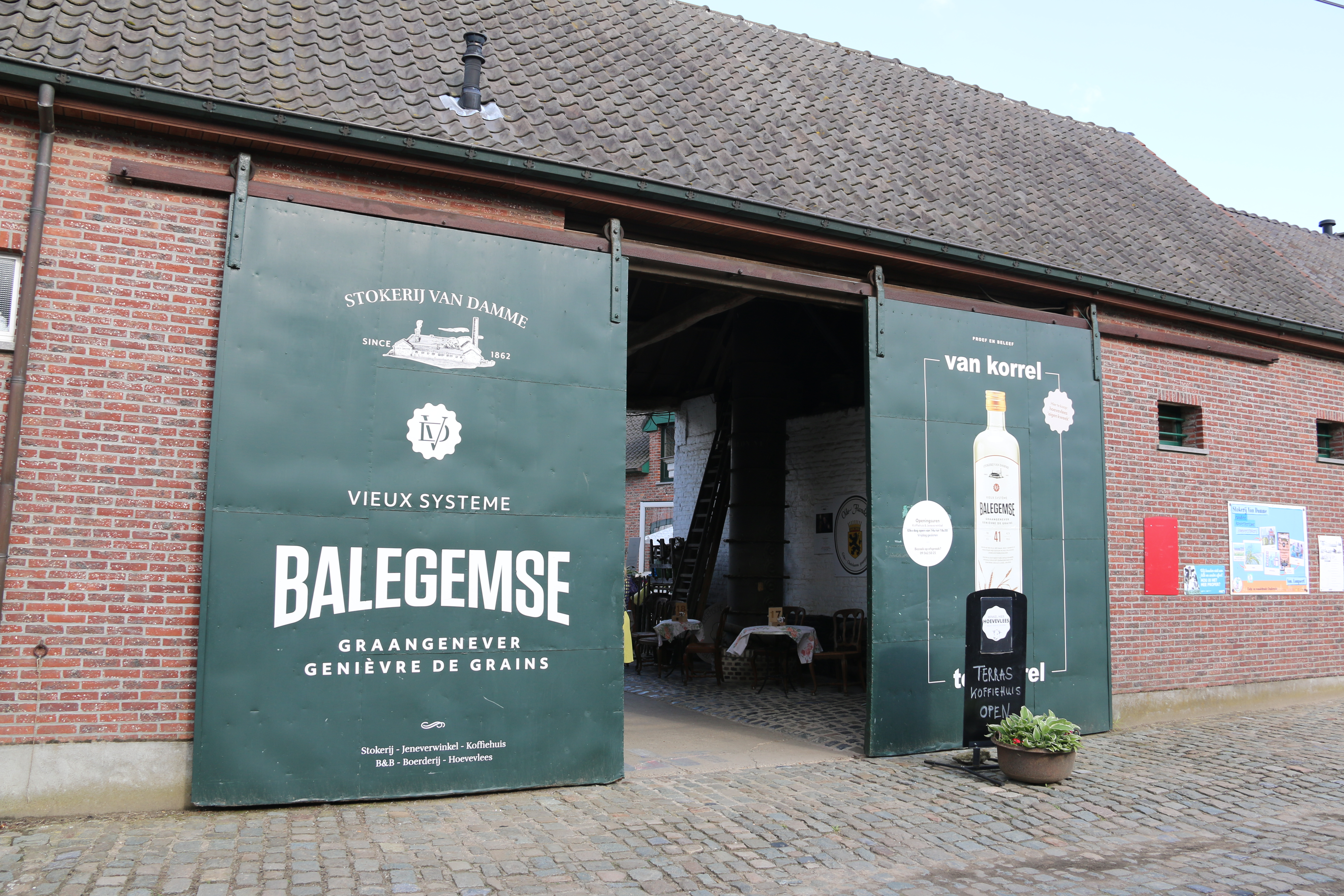

The company was founded in 1862 by Henri De Backer. When he died in 1885, his property was divided among his three children. His daughter Sidonie inherited the distillery. Her husband Gustaaf Van Damme gave his name to the company.

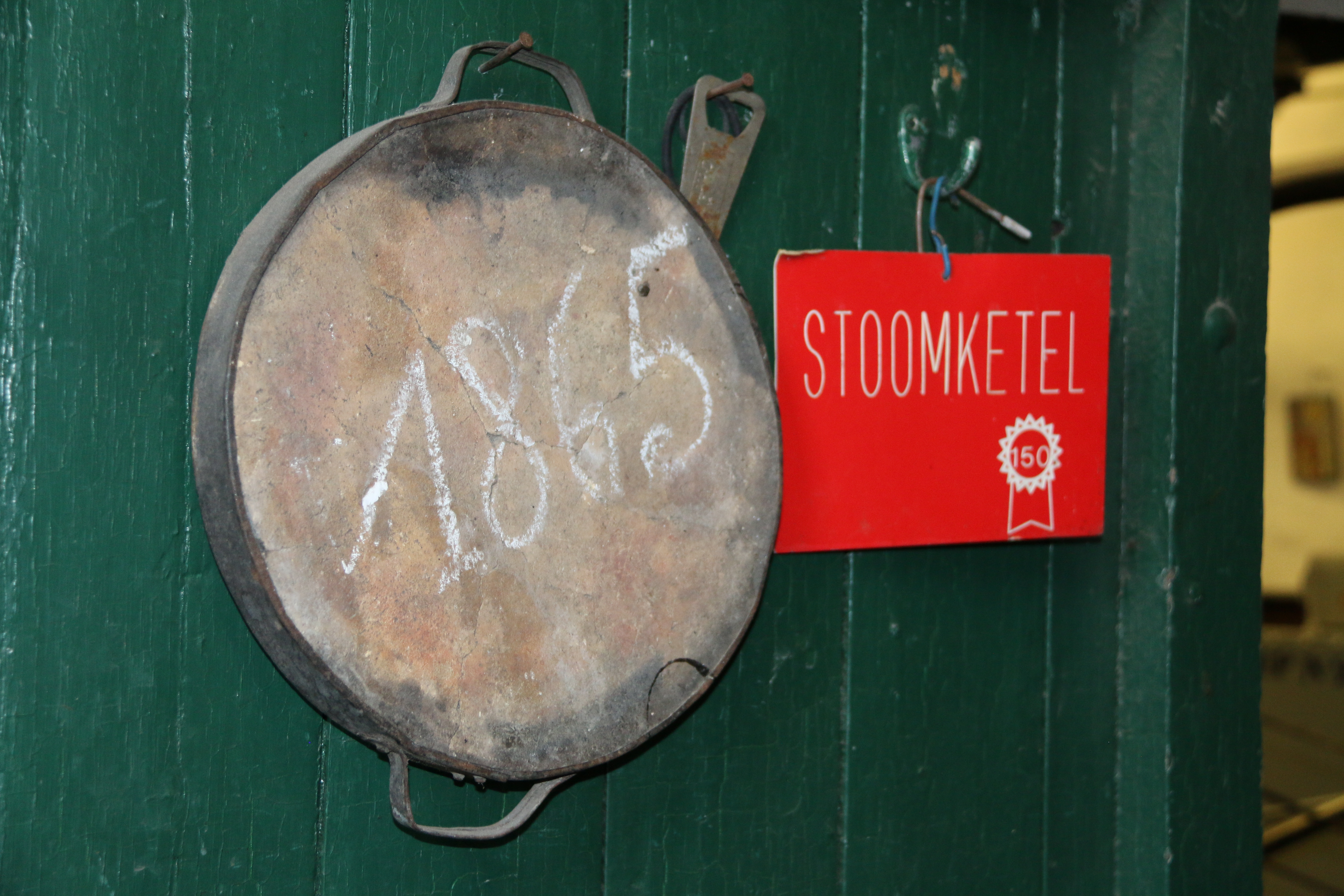

In 1929 son Henri took over and installed a grain processing plant. After his death, brother Odilon and sisters Maria, Gabrielle and Marguerite took over. Maria married Raphael Ghijs and in 1958 their daughter Celine Ghijs married André van Hecke. Celine and André continued the business. Ludo Lampaert, a cousin of the Van Damme family, had worked in the distillery since the 1980s. When André died in 1993, Ludo and his wife Dominique took over the company. When Ludo died unexpectedly in 2019, the reins passed to his three daughters Sophie, Eva and Ilse.

Van Damme is the only remaining agricultural distillery in the Benelux. In other words, it grows its own grain for the production of jenever. The millstones for grinding the grain (mainly rye, to a lesser extent wheat) are driven by a wood or coal-fired steam engine.

In the summer the focus is on farming. Jenever is distilled from December to April. The farm, grain loft, mill and steam engine date from 1898 and are still in use. The Van Damme distillery has been a protected monument since 2009.

One wing of the listed square farmstead is used for bed and breakfast accommodation.

The signposted (H)Ettingen footpath along Ettinge Woods starts at the farm.

== Products ==
On its labels and colloquially the distillery's products are referred to as Balegemse. This is a protected geographical indication. The company grows its own grain and produces grain jenever of 31°, 41° and 54°, lemon and cherry gin of 20°, advocaat of 15° and grain jenever and advocaat pralines.

The distillery's products are sold on site in a small shop at the back of a former cowshed. The rest of this space is used, among other things, for receptions with jenever tasting.
