= List of railway stations in Belgium =

Belgium has an extensive passenger railway network managed by the National Railway Company of Belgium.

== List of stations ==
=== A ===
Station	Code	Line	Province	Opened
Aalst	FLS	50, 57, 82	East Flanders	1853
Aalst-Kerrebroek	FLSK	82	East Flanders	
Aalter	FLT	50A	East Flanders	1838
Aarschot	FRST	35	Flemish Brabant	1863
Aarsele	FAR	73	West Flanders	
Acren	FXA	90	Hainaut	
Aiseau	FAO	130	Hainaut	
Alken	FAK	21	Limburg	1847
Amay	NM	125	Liège	
Ampsin	NA	125	Liège	
Andenne	NDN	125	Namur	
Anderlecht		50A	Brussels-Capital Region	
Angleur	MGR	37	Liège	
Ans	ANS	HSL 2, 36	Liège	
Anseremme	MNS	166	Liège	
Antoing	FNT	78	Hainaut	
Antwerpen-Berchem	FCV	25, 27, 27A, 59	Antwerp	1865
Antwerpen-Centraal	FN	12, 25, 27	Antwerp	1836
Antwerpen-Luchtbal	FNLB	HSL 4, 12, 25, 27A	Antwerp	1932
Antwerpen-Noorderdokken	AND	12, 27A	Antwerp	1974
Antwerpen-Zuid	FNZD	52, 59	Antwerp	1903
Anzegem	FAN	89	West Flanders	
Appelterre	MAP	90	East Flanders	
Arcades	GAR	26	Brussels-Capital Region	2016
Archennes		139	Walloon Brabant	
Arlon	LL	162	Luxembourg	
Asse	LAS	60	Flemish Brabant	
Assesse	MAS	162	Namur	
Ath	ATH	90, 94	Hainaut	
Athus	MH	165, 167	Luxembourg	
Aubange	MAB	165	Luxembourg	
Auvelais	FVL	130	Namur	
Aye	AYE	162	Luxembourg	
Aywaille	MWL	42	Liège	

=== B ===
Station	Code	Line	Province	Opened
Baasrode-Zuid	FRA	53	East Flanders	
Balegem-Dorp	FGED	122	East Flanders	
Balegem-Zuid	FGE	122	East Flanders	
Balen	LNE	15	Antwerp	
Bambrugge	BAM	82	East Flanders	
Barvaux	LBV	43	Luxembourg	
Bas-Oha	NBE	125	Liège	
Basse-Wavre	BGWV	139	Walloon Brabant	
Beauraing	MBG	166	Namur	
Beernem	LBM	50A	West Flanders	
Beersel	GBB	26	Flemish Brabant	
Beervelde	FBV	59	East Flanders	
Begijnendijk	GBD	16	Flemish Brabant	
Beignée	BEI	132	Hainaut	
Bellem	FEB	50A	East Flanders	
Belsele	LLB	59	East Flanders	
Beringen	LBN	15	Limburg	
Berlaar	GBL	16	Antwerp	
Bertrix	MBX	165, 166	Luxembourg	
Berzée	LBZ	132	Namur	
Beuzet	MBZ	161	Namur	
Beveren	FBR	59	East Flanders	1844
Beverlo	MBV	15	Limburg	
Bierges-Walibi	FBRG	139	Walloon Brabant	
Bierset-Awans	FTI	36	Liège	
Bilzen	FIE	34	Limburg	
Binche	LBH	108	Hainaut	
Bissegem	MIM	69	West Flanders	
Blankenberge	FBK	51	West Flanders	1863
Blanmont	MBL	161	Walloon Brabant	
Blaton	LLT	78	Hainaut	
Bleret	BLE	36	Liège	
Bockstael	FBL	50	Brussels-Capital Region	1982
Boechout	GBC	15	Antwerp	1864
Boitsfort	MBR	161	Brussels-Capital Region	
Bokrijk	FKY	21A	Limburg	1874; 1979
Bomal	MBM	43	Luxembourg	
Booischot	GB	16	Antwerp	
Boom	FMB	52	Antwerp	
Boondael	BOL	26	Brussels-Capital Region	
Boortmeerbeek	FOB	53	Flemish Brabant	
Bordet	BOR	26	Brussels-Capital Region	1926
Bornem	LOB	54	Antwerp	
Boussu	FSB	97	Hainaut	
Bouwel	FOW	15	Antwerp	1855
Bracquegnies	LBQ	118	Hainaut	
Braine-l'Alleud	FBD	124	Walloon Brabant	1874
Braine-le-Comte	FBC	96, 117, 123	Hainaut	1841
Bressoux	FBX	40	Liège	
Brugelette	FBG	90	Hainaut	
Brugge	FR	50A, 51, 51A, 51B, 58, 66	West Flanders	1838
Brugge-Sint-Pieters	FRSP	51, 51A	West Flanders	
Brussels Airport-Zaventem	FBNL	36C	Flemish Brabant	1958
Brussels-Chapel	FBCK	0	Brussels-Capital Region	1952
Brussels-Central	FBCL	0	Brussels-Capital Region	1952
Brussels-Congress	FBCO	0	Brussels-Capital Region	1952
Brussels-Luxembourg	LX	161	Brussels-Capital Region	1854
Brussels-North	FBN	0, 25, 27, 36, 50	Brussels-Capital Region	1952
Brussels-Schuman	FBSM	161	Brussels-Capital Region	1969
Brussels-South	FBMZ	0, 28, 50A, 96, 124	Brussels-Capital Region	1952
Brussels-West	FBOW	28	Brussels-Capital Region	1982
Buda	BUDA	25	Flemish Brabant	
Buggenhout	FGN	53	East Flanders	
Buizingen	FGU	96	Flemish Brabant	
Burst	FRU	82, 89	East Flanders	

=== C ===
Station	Code	Line	Province	Opened
Callenelle	FCA	78	Hainaut	
Cambron-Casteau	FUC	90	Hainaut	
Carlsbourg	MCL	166	Luxembourg	
Carnières	LNS	112	Hainaut	
Céroux-Mousty	MCM	140	Walloon Brabant	
Chapelle-Dieu		144	Namur	
Chapois		162	Namur	
Charleroi-Central	FCR	124, 130, 130A	Hainaut	1843
Charleroi-West	FCRO	140	Hainaut	1855; 1886
Chastre	MC	161	Walloon Brabant	
Château-de-Seilles		125	Namur	
Châtelet	FCL	130	Hainaut	
Chaudfontaine	FCF	37	Liège	
Chênée	FCH	HSL 3, 37	Liège	
Ciney	LC	162	Namur	
Comblain-la-Tour	MCT	43	Liège	
Comines	FOI	69	Hainaut	
Coo		42	Liège	
Couillet	LCL	130	Hainaut	
Cour-sur-Heure	LUH	132	Hainaut	
Courcelles-Motte	LCCM	124	Hainaut	
Courrière	MRR	162	Namur	
Court-Saint-Étienne	LCN	140	Walloon Brabant	
Couvin	LCV	134	Namur	

=== D ===
Station	Code	Line	Province	Opened
Dave-Saint-Martin	MDT	162	Namur	
De Hoek		124	Flemish Brabant	
De Panne	FDK	73	West Flanders	
De Pinte	FPT	75, 86	East Flanders	
Deinze	FD	73, 75	East Flanders	
Delta		26	Brussels-Capital Region	1976
Denderleeuw	FDD	50, 89, 90	East Flanders	1855
Dendermonde	FDR	52, 53, 57, 60	East Flanders	
Diegem	FDG	36	Flemish Brabant	
Diepenbeek	GDP	34	Limburg	1856; 1991
Diesdelle		26	Brussels-Capital Region	
Diest	FDT	35	Flemish Brabant	
Diksmuide	FIK	73	West Flanders	
Dilbeek	FKB	50	Flemish Brabant	
Dinant	NDT	154	Namur	1862
Dolhain-Gileppe	GDL	37	Liège	
Drongen	FDO	50A	East Flanders	
Duffel	FDF	25, 27	Antwerp	1836
Duinbergen		51B	West Flanders	1920

=== E ===
Station	Code	Line	Province	Opened
Écaussinnes	FCS	117	Hainaut	
Ede	MEE	89	East Flanders	
Eeklo	FKLO	58	East Flanders	1861
Eichem		90	East Flanders	
Eine	FEI	86	East Flanders	
Eke-Nazareth	FKE	86	East Flanders	
Ekeren	LKR	12	Antwerp	1854
Enghien	FNG	94, 123	Hainaut	
Engis	NG	125	Liège	
Eppegem	FPH	25, 27	Flemish Brabant	1865
Erbisœul	FIU	90, 96	Hainaut	
Erembodegem	FRMB	50	East Flanders	
Ernage	MNG	161	Namur	
Erpe-Mere	FRPM	82	East Flanders	
Erps-Kwerps	MRP	36	Flemish Brabant	
Erquelinnes	LQ	108, 130A	Hainaut	
Erquelinnes-Village		130A	Hainaut	
Esneux	LSN	43	Liège	
Essen	FES	12	Antwerp	1854
Essene-Lombeek	FKS	50	Flemish Brabant	
Etterbeek	MTB	161	Brussels-Capital Region	1880
Eupen	REP	49	Liège	1864
Evere		26	Brussels-Capital Region	1926
Evergem	FMV	58	East Flanders	1861; 2007
Ezemaal	FZE	36	Flemish Brabant	

=== F ===
Station	Code	Line	Province	Opened
Familleureux	FFM	117	Hainaut	
Farciennes	FFC	130	Hainaut	
Faux	MFX	140	Walloon Brabant	1901
Fexhe-le-Haut-Clocher	FXH	36	Liège	
Flawinne	FFW	130	Namur	
Flémalle-Grande	NFG	125	Liège	
Flémalle-Haute	LFH	125, 125A	Liège	
Fleurus	LFR	140	Hainaut	
Floreffe	FLF	130	Namur	
Florenville	MFL	165	Luxembourg	
Florival	GFL	139	Walloon Brabant	
Fontaine-Valmont	NFV	130A	Hainaut	
Forchies	LFC	112	Hainaut	
Forest-East	FOST	124	Brussels-Capital Region	1873
Forest-South	FO	96	Brussels-Capital Region	1862
Forrières	MFR	162	Luxembourg	
Fraipont		37	Liège	
Frameries	LRS	96	Hainaut	
Franchimont		44	Liège	
Franière	FNF	130	Namur	
Froyennes	GFY	75A, 94	Hainaut	

=== G ===
Station	Code	Line	Province	Opened
Galmaarden	FGM	123	Flemish Brabant	
Gastuche	GG	139	Walloon Brabant	
Gavere-Asper	FGA	86	East Flanders	
Gedinne	MG	166	Namur	
Geel	LG	15	Antwerp	
Gembloux	LGB	144, 161	Namur	1855
Gendron-Celles	MGN	166	Namur	
Genk	FKG	21D	Limburg	1874; 1979
Genly	MLY	96	Hainaut	
Gent-Dampoort	FGDM	58, 59	East Flanders	1861
Gent-Sint-Pieters	FGSP	50, 50A, 55, 58, 75	East Flanders	1912
Gentbrugge	FUGE	58	East Flanders	1861
Genval	MGV	161	Walloon Brabant	1889
Geraardsbergen	FGRA	90, 122, 123	East Flanders	
Germoir		161	Brussels-Capital Region	2015
Ghlin	FIH	96	Hainaut	
Glons	LGL	34	Liège	
Godarville	FDI	117	Hainaut	
Godinne	NGD	154	Namur	
Gontrode	FOO	122	East Flanders	
Gouvy	FVY	42	Luxembourg	
Gouy-lez-Piéton	FGP	117	Hainaut	
Graide	MGD	166	Namur	
Groenendaal	MDL	161	Flemish Brabant	
Groot-Bijgaarden	MGA	50	Flemish Brabant	
Grupont	MGP	162	Luxembourg	

=== H ===
Station	Code	Line	Province	Opened
Haacht	FAT	53	Flemish Brabant	1837
Haaltert	FHA	89	East Flanders	
Habay	MHB	162	Luxembourg	
Hainin		97	Hainaut	
Halanzy	MHZ	165	Luxembourg	
Halle	FH	HSL 1, 26, 94, 96	Flemish Brabant	1840
Ham-sur-Heure	LHH	132	Hainaut	
Hambos		53	Flemish Brabant	
Hamoir	LHM	43	Liège	
Hamont	GHA	19	Limburg	
Hansbeke	FHK	50A	East Flanders	
Harchies	FRH	78	Hainaut	
Harelbeke	FHL	75	West Flanders	1839
Haren	GHT	26	Brussels-Capital Region	
Haren-South	HARZ	36	Brussels-Capital Region	
Hasselt	FHS	21, 21A, 34, 35	Limburg	1847
Haute-Flône		125	Liège	
Haversin	MHV	162	Namur	
Havré	LHR	118	Hainaut	
Heide	MID	12	Antwerp	1897
Heist	FHI	51B	West Flanders	
Heist-op-den-Berg	GHO	16	Antwerp	1864
Heizijde	LEZ	60	East Flanders	
Hemiksem	LKM	52	Antwerp	
Hennuyères	FNY	96	Hainaut	
Herent	FET	36	Flemish Brabant	
Herentals	FHT	15, 29	Antwerp	1855
Hergenrath	REG	37	Liège	
Herne	FRE	123	Flemish Brabant	
Herseaux	FXS	75A	Hainaut	
Herstal	LHS	34	Liège	
Herzele	FHZ	82, 89	East Flanders	
Heusden	MHD	15	Limburg	
Hever		53	Flemish Brabant	
Heverlee	GHE	139	Flemish Brabant	
Hillegem		82, 89	East Flanders	
Hoboken-Polder	FOE	52	Antwerp	
Hoeilaart		161	Flemish Brabant	
Hofstade	FHF	27B	Flemish Brabant	
Holleken		124	Flemish Brabant	
Hony		43	Liège	
Houraing		90	Hainaut	
Hourpes		130A	Hainaut	
Houyet	MHY	166	Namur	
Hove	MHO	25, 27	Antwerp	1888
Huizingen	HUIZ	26	Flemish Brabant	
Huy	LY	125	Liège	

=== I ===
Station	Code	Line	Province	Opened
Iddergem		90	East Flanders	
Idegem	FID	90	East Flanders	
Ieper	FI	69	West Flanders	
Ingelmunster	FNM	66	West Flanders	
Izegem	LZG	66	West Flanders	

=== J ===
Station	Code	Line	Province	Opened
Jambes	NJ	154	Namur	1862
Jambes-Est	MJS	162	Namur	
Jamioulx	GJ	132	Hainaut	
Jemappes	FJM	97	Hainaut	
Jemeppe-sur-Meuse	LJP	125	Liège	
Jemeppe-sur-Sambre	FJS	130, 144	Namur	
Jette	FJT	50, 60	Brussels-Capital Region	1858
Jurbise	FJR	90, 96	Hainaut	
Juslenville	FJL	44	Liège	

=== K ===
Station	Code	Line	Province	Opened
Kalmthout	FKTH	12	Antwerp	1854
Kapelle-op-den-Bos	FKP	53	Flemish Brabant	
Kapellen	LKP	12	Antwerp	1854
Kessel	LEK	15	Antwerp	1894
Kiewit		21A	Limburg	1974; 1989
Kijkuit	GKT	12	Antwerp	1933
Knokke	FKK	51B	West Flanders	1920
Koksijde	MX	73	West Flanders	
Kontich-Lint	FKI	13, 25 27	Antwerp	1836
Kortemark	FTK	73	West Flanders	
Kortenberg	FTB	36	Flemish Brabant	
Kortrijk	LK	66, 69, 75, 89	West Flanders	1839
Kwatrecht	FQT	50	East Flanders	

=== L ===
Station	Code	Line	Province	Opened
La Hulpe	ML	161	Walloon Brabant	
La Louvière-Centre	LVR	112, 116, 118	Hainaut	
La Louvière-Sud	LVRS	112	Hainaut	
La Roche	GLR	140	Walloon Brabant	
Labuissière	NLB	130A	Hainaut	
Landegem	FLM	50A	East Flanders	
Landelies	NL	130A	Hainaut	
Landen	FLD	21, 36	Flemish Brabant	1838
Landskouter		122	East Flanders	
Langdorp		35	Flemish Brabant	
Le Campinaire	FRC	130	Hainaut	
Lebbeke	LEB	60	East Flanders	
Lede	FLE	50	East Flanders	
Leignon	MLG	162	Namur	
Leman		125	Liège	
Lembeek	FLB	96	Flemish Brabant	
Lens	FNE	90	Hainaut	
Leopoldsburg	LBG	15	Limburg	
Lessines	FLN	90	Hainaut	
Leuven	FLV	HSL 2, 35, 36, 53, 139	Flemish Brabant	1837
Leuze	FLZ	86, 94	Hainaut	
Leval	LVL	108	Hainaut	
Libramont	LRB	162, 165	Luxembourg	1858
Lichtervelde	FLC	66, 73	West Flanders	
Liedekerke	LKD	50	Flemish Brabant	
Liège-Carré		34	Liège	
Liège-Guillemins	FL	34, 36, 37, 125	Liège	1842
Liège-Saint-Lambert	FLGP	34	Liège	
Lier	FLR	13, 15	Antwerp	
Lierde	FRD	122	East Flanders	
Liers	LSL	34	Liège	
Ligny	FGY	140	Namur	
Lillois	FOL	124	Walloon Brabant	
Limal	GLM	139	Walloon Brabant	
Linkebeek	LKN	124	Flemish Brabant	
Lissewege	FLW	51A	West Flanders	
Lobbes	NLS	130A	Hainaut	
Lodelinsart	LDS	140	Hainaut	
Lokeren	FLK	57, 59	East Flanders	1847
Lommel	LOL	19	Limburg	
Londerzeel	FZL	53	Flemish Brabant	
Lonzée	MLZ	161	Namur	
Lot	LOT	96	Flemish Brabant	
Louvain-la-Neuve	LNO	161D	Walloon Brabant	
Lustin	NLT	154	Namur	
Luttre	FLU	117, 124	Hainaut	

=== M ===
Station	Code	Line	Province	Opened
Maffle	FFA	90	Hainaut	
Malderen	FMD	53	Flemish Brabant	
Manage	FMN	116, 117	Hainaut	
Marbehan	LMH	162	Luxembourg	
Marche-en-Famenne	MCH	43	Luxembourg	
Marche-les-Dames	NMD	125	Namur	
Marche-lez-Écaussinnes	FCZ	117	Hainaut	
Marchienne-au-Pont	FMR	112, 124	Hainaut	
Marchienne-Zône	NZ	130A	Hainaut	
Maria-Aalter	FIA	50A	East Flanders	
Mariembourg	LMG	132, 134	Namur	
Marloie	MML	43, 162	Luxembourg	
Masnuy-Saint-Pierre	FYP	96	Hainaut	
Maubray	MAU	78	Hainaut	
Mazy	FZY	144	Namur	
Mechelen	FM	25, 27, 53	Antwerp	1835
Mechelen-Nekkerspoel	LNK	25, 27, 27B	Antwerp	1903
Meiser		26	Brussels-Capital Region	1976
Melkouwen	MWC	16	Antwerp	
Melle	FML	50	East Flanders	
Melreux-Hotton	MLR	43	Luxembourg	
Melsele	LM	59	East Flanders	
Menen	FME	69	West Flanders	
Merchtem	FMHT	60	Flemish Brabant	
Merelbeke	FKR	50	East Flanders	
Merode		26	Brussels-Capital Region	1976
Méry		43	Liège	
Messancy	MY	166	Luxembourg	
Mévergnies-Attre	FEV	90	Hainaut	
Milmort	LTM	34	Liège	
Moensberg		26	Brussels-Capital Region	
Mol	LML	15	Antwerp	
Mollem	LHL	60	Flemish Brabant	
Momalle	MO	36	Liège	
Mons	FMS	96, 97, 118	Hainaut	1841
Mont-Saint-Guibert	MM	161	Walloon Brabant	
Moortsele	FZM	122	East Flanders	
Morlanwelz	LMZ	112	Hainaut	
Mortsel	GMO	27	Antwerp	1895
Mortsel-Deurnesteenweg		25	Antwerp	1933
Mortsel-Liersesteenweg		27	Antwerp	1933; 2008
Mortsel-Oude-God	GMOG	25	Antwerp	1836
Mouscron	FMC	75, 75A	Hainaut	
Moustier	FMT	130	Namur	
Muizen	FIZ	27B, 53	Antwerp	
Munkzwalm	MNK	89	East Flanders	

=== N ===
Station	Code	Line	Province	Opened
Namêche	NMH	125	Namur	
Namur	FNR	125, 130, 154, 161, 162	Namur	1843
Naninne	MNN	162	Namur	
Natoye	MNT	162	Namur	
Neerpelt	LNP	19	Limburg	
Neerwinden	FWI	36	Flemish Brabant	
Nessonvaux	FNV	37	Liège	
Neufchâteau	LNG	162	Luxembourg	
Neufvilles	FFV	96	Hainaut	
Niel	LNI	52	Antwerp	
Nieuwkerken-Waas	FNU	59	East Flanders	
Nijlen	FJE	15	Antwerp	1855
Nimy	LNM	118	Hainaut	
Ninove	FNN	90	East Flanders	
Nivelles	FNVT	124	Walloon Brabant	1874
Noorderkempen	NDK	HSL 4	Antwerp	2009
Nossegem	LEM	36	Flemish Brabant	

=== O ===
Station	Code	Line	Province	Opened
Obaix-Buzet	FXB	124	Hainaut	
Obourg	LRG	118	Hainaut	
Okegem	FKO	90	East Flanders	
Olen	GOL	15	Antwerp	
Oostende	FSD	50A	West Flanders	1838
Oostkamp	FPO	50A	West Flanders	
Opwijk	FKW	60	Flemish Brabant	
Ottignies	LT	139, 140, 161	Walloon Brabant	1855
Oud-Heverlee	GVH	139	Flemish Brabant	
Oudegem	FDM	53, 57	East Flanders	
Oudenaarde	FDN	86, 89	East Flanders	
Ougrée	LGR	125A	Liège	
Overpelt		19	Limburg	

=== P ===
Station	Code	Line	Province	Opened
Paliseul	MPL	166	Luxembourg	
Papignies	FAP	90	Hainaut	
Pécrot		139	Walloon Brabant	
Pepinster	FPS	37, 44	Liège	
Pepinster-Cité		44	Liège	
Péruwelz	FPL	78	Hainaut	
Philippeville	GPL	132	Namur	
Piéton	LPT	112	Hainaut	
Poix-Saint-Hubert	MPX	162	Luxembourg	
Pont-à-Celles	FPN	117	Hainaut	
Pont-de-Seraing		125	Liège	
Poperinge	FPP	69	West Flanders	
Poulseur	MPS	43	Liège	
Profondsart	MPS	161	Walloon Brabant	
Pry	PRY	132	Namur	
Puurs	FRP	54	Antwerp	

=== Q ===
Station	Code	Line	Province	Opened
Quaregnon	FQR	97	Hainaut	
Quévy	LQV	96	Hainaut	
Quiévrain	FQ	97	Hainaut	

=== R ===
Station	Code	Line	Province	Opened
Rebaix	FXR	90	Hainaut	
Remicourt	FMU	36	Liège	
Rhisnes	MRN	161	Namur	
Rivage	MRV	42, 43	Liège	
Rixensart	MRX	161	Walloon Brabant	
Roeselare	FRL	66	West Flanders	1847
Rochefort-Jemelle	LJ	162	Namur	
Ronet	FEO	130	Namur	
Ronse	FRN	82, 86	East Flanders	
Roux	FRX	124	Hainaut	
Ruisbroek	FRB	96	Flemish Brabant	
Ruisbroek-Sauvegarde	FSV	52	Flemish Brabant	

=== S ===
Station	Code	Line	Province	Opened
Saint-Denis-Bovesse	MD	161	Namur	
Saint-Ghislain	FGH	78, 90, 97	Hainaut	
Sart-Bernard		162	Namur	
Schaarbeek	FSR	25, 26, 27, 28, 36, 161	Brussels-Capital Region	1887
Scheldewindeke	FSK	122	East Flanders	
Schelle		52	Antwerp	
Schellebelle	FCB	50, 53	East Flanders	
Schendelbeke	FED	90	East Flanders	
Schoonaarde	FAD	53	East Flanders	
Schulen	GSU	35	Limburg	
Sclaigneaux	NS	125	Namur	
Sclessin	NSN	125	Liège	
Seraing	NSR	125A	Liège	
Serskamp		50	East Flanders	
Silly	FIL	94	Hainaut	1866
Simonis	FKRG	28	Brussels-Capital Region	2009
Sinaai	LSW	59	East Flanders	
Sint-Agatha-Berchem	FBSG	50	Brussels-Capital Region	
Sint-Denijs-Boekel	FNZ	89	East Flanders	
Sint-Genesius-Rode	FGO	124	Flemish Brabant	
Sint-Gillis	GIL	60	East Flanders	
Sint-Job		26	Brussels-Capital Region	
Sint-Joris-Weert	GSW	139	Flemish Brabant	
Sint-Katelijne-Waver	FWA	25, 27	Antwerp	1865
Sint-Mariaburg	MRB	12	Antwerp	1934
Sint-Martens-Bodegem	FSMB	50	Flemish Brabant	
Sint-Niklaas	FSN	54, 59	East Flanders	1844
Sint-Truiden	FST	21	Limburg	1839
Sleidinge	LSD	58	East Flanders	1861; 1988
Soignies	FSG	96	Hainaut	
Solre-sur-Sambre	NSS	130A	Hainaut	
Spa	FSS	44	Liège	
Spa-Géronstère	FSSG	44	Liège	
Statte	LHY	125	Liège	
Stockem	MKM	162	Luxembourg	
Sy		43	Liège	1891

=== T ===
Station	Code	Line	Province	Opened
Tamines	FTM	130	Namur	
Temse	FTS	54	East Flanders	
Terhagen	MTH	82, 89	East Flanders	
Ternat	FTN	50	Flemish Brabant	
Testelt	GTT	35	Flemish Brabant	
Theux	FTX	44	Liège	
Thieu	LU	118	Hainaut	
Thuin	NTH	130A	Hainaut	
Thulin	FTU	97	Hainaut	
Tielen	FIT	29	Antwerp	1855
Tielt	FTT	73	West Flanders	
Tienen	FTNN	36	Flemish Brabant	1837
Tilff	MTF	43	Liège	
Tilly	GTI	140	Walloon Brabant	
Tollembeek	LOK	123	Flemish Brabant	
Tongeren	FTG	24, 34	Limburg	1863
Torhout	FRT	66	West Flanders	
Tour et Taxis	FPNO	28	Brussels-Capital Region	1883; 2015
Tournai	FTY	78, 94	Hainaut	1842
Trois-Ponts	FNO	42	Liège	
Trooz	FRZ	37	Liège	
Tubize	FTZ	96	Walloon Brabant	
Turnhout	FTR	29	Antwerp	1855

=== U ===
Station	Code	Line	Province	Opened
Uccle-Calevoet	FTE	124	Brussels-Capital Region	1873
Uccle-Stalle	FUS	124	Brussels-Capital Region	1873

=== V ===
Station	Code	Line	Province	Opened
Veltem	FEM	36	Flemish Brabant	
Vertrijk	FVK	36	Flemish Brabant	
Verviers-Central	GV	37	Liège	1930
Verviers-Paleis	GV	37	Liège	
Veurne	FVU	73	West Flanders	
Viane-Moerbeke	FKV	123	East Flanders	
Vichte	FVE	89	West Flanders	
Vielsalm	FVI	42	Luxembourg	
Vijfhuizen		82	East Flanders	
Ville-Pommerœul	FPM	78	Hainaut	
Villers-la-Ville	LLE	140	Walloon Brabant	
Vilvoorde	FVV	25, 27	Flemish Brabant	1835
Virton	MSM	165	Luxembourg	1879
Visé	FVS	40	Liège	
Viville		162	Luxembourg	
Voroux	GVX	36	Liège	

=== W ===
Station	Code	Line	Province	Opened
Waarschoot	LWT	58	East Flanders	1861
Walcourt	LWC	132	Namur	
Waregem	FVG	75	West Flanders	
Waremme	FVR	36	Liège	
Waterloo	FWT	124	Walloon Brabant	1874
Watermael	FW	161	Brussels-Capital Region	
Wavre	GWV	139	Walloon Brabant	
Weerde	FWE	25, 27	Flemish Brabant	1864
Welkenraedt	GWK	37, 39, 49	Liège	1843
Welle		89	East Flanders	
Wervik	LWK	69	West Flanders	
Wespelaar-Tildonk	FVP	53	Flemish Brabant	
Wetteren	FVT	50	East Flanders	
Wevelgem	FWM	69	West Flanders	
Wezemaal		35	Flemish Brabant	
Wichelen	FNW	53	East Flanders	
Wijgmaal	FWG	53	Flemish Brabant	1864
Wildert	GWD	12	Antwerp	1881
Willebroek	FWB	54	Antwerp	
Wolfstee		15	Antwerp	2004
Wondelgem	FWO	55, 58	East Flanders	

=== Y ===
Station	Code	Line	Province	Opened
Yves-Gomezée		132	Namur	
Yvoir	NV	154	Namur	

=== Z ===
Station	Code	Line	Province	Opened
Zandbergen	FZB	90	East Flanders	
Zaventem	FZA	36	Flemish Brabant	
Zedelgem	LZM	66	West Flanders	
Zeebrugge-Dorp	LZG	51A	West Flanders	
Zeebrugge-Strand	LZS	51A	West Flanders	
Zele	FZ	57	East Flanders	
Zellik	FZI	60	Flemish Brabant	
Zichem	GZC	35	Flemish Brabant	
Zingem	FZG	86	East Flanders	
Zolder	MZD	15	Limburg	
Zonhoven	LZH	15	Limburg	
Zottegem	FZT	82, 89, 122	East Flanders	
Zwijndrecht	LZD	59	Antwerp	
