= List of railway lines in Belgium =

All railway lines in Belgium are identified by a route number and these numbers are in widespread general use (for example, in passenger train timetables). Most of the numbers have remained unchanged since the creation of the SNCB/NMBS in the 1920s, although line closures and the construction of new routes have led to a few alterations over the years.

Map of rail transport infrastructure in Belgium.

== Lines currently used by passenger train services ==
- Line 0: Brussels-North - Brussels-South
- HSL 1: France - Brussels-South
- HSL 2: Leuven - Ans (Liège)
- HSL 3: Liège-Guillemins - Aachen (Germany)
- HSL 4: Antwerpen-Centraal - Breda (Netherlands)
- Line 12: Antwerpen-Centraal - Roosendaal (Netherlands)
- Line 13: Kontich - Lier
- Line 15: Antwerpen - Hasselt
- Line 16: Lier - Aarschot
- Line 19: Mol - Weert (Netherlands)
- Line 21: Landen - Hasselt
- Line 21A: Hasselt - Genk
- Line 25: Brussels-North - Antwerpen-Centraal
- Line 25N: Schaarbeek - Mechelen
- Line 26: Schaerbeek - Halle
- Line 27: Brussels-North - Antwerpen
- Line 27B: Weerde - Mechelen-Nekkerspoel
- Line 28: Schaerbeek - Brussels-South
- Line 29: Herentals - Turnhout
- Line 34: Hasselt - Liège-Guillemins
- Line 35: Leuven - Hasselt
- Line 36: Brussels-North - Liège-Guillemins
- Line 36A
- Line 36C: Zaventem - Brussels Airport
- Line 36C/1
- Line 36C/2
- Line 36N
- Line 37: Liège-Guillemins - Aachen (Germany)
- Line 40: Liège-Guillemins - Maastricht (Netherlands)
- Line 42: Rivage - Gouvy
- Line 43: Angleur (Liège) - Marloie
- Line 44: Pepinster - Spa-Géronstère
- Line 49: Welkenraedt - Eupen
- Line 50: Brussels-North - Gent-Sint-Pieters
- Line 50A: Brussels-South - Oostende
- Line 51: Bruges - Blankenberge
- Line 51A: Bruges - Zeebrugge
- Line 51B: Bruges - Knokke
- Line 52: Antwerp - Dendermonde
- Line 53: Schellebelle - Leuven
- Line 54: Mechelen - Sint-Niklaas
- Line 57: Dendermonde - Lokeren
- Line 58: Ghent - Maldegem
- Line 59: Antwerp - Ghent
- Line 60: Jette - Dendermonde
- Line 66: Bruges - Kortrijk
- Line 69: Kortrijk - Poperinge
- Line 73: Deinze - De Panne
- Line 75: Ghent - Lille (France)
- Line 75A: Mouscron - Tournai
- Line 78: Saint-Ghislain - Tournai
- Line 82: Aalst - Zottegem
- Line 86: Ronse - De Pinte
- Line 89: Kortrijk - Denderleeuw
- Line 90: Denderleeuw - Jurbise
- Line 94: Halle - Lille (France)
- Line 96: Brussels-South - Quévy
- Line 97: Mons - Quiévrain
- Line 108: La Louvière - Binche
- Line 112: La Louvière - Charleroi
- Line 116: La Louvière - Manage
- Line 117: Luttre - Braine-le-Comte
- Line 118: La Louvière - Mons
- Line 122: Melle - Geraardsbergen
- Line 123: Geraardsbergen - Enghien
- Line 124: Brussels-South - Charleroi-South
- Line 125: Namur - Liège-Guillemins
- Line 130: Namur - Charleroi-South
- Line 130A: Charleroi-South - Jeumont (France)
- Line 132: Mariembourg - Charleroi-South
- Line 134: Mariembourg - Couvin
- Line 139: Leuven - Ottignies
- Line 140: Ottignies - Charleroi-South
- Line 144: Gembloux - Jemeppe-sur-Sambre
- Line 154: Namur - Dinant
- Line 161: Brussels-North - Namur
- Line 161D: Ottignies - Louvain-la-Neuve
- Line 162: Namur - Luxembourg
- Line 165: Libramont - Athus
- Line 166: Dinant - Bertrix
- Line 167: Arlon - Athus

== See also ==
- National Railway Company of Belgium
- Infrabel
- List of Belgian railway services
- Belgian Railways (disambiguation)
