= Hermalle-sous-Huy train collision =

2016 rail crash in Belgium

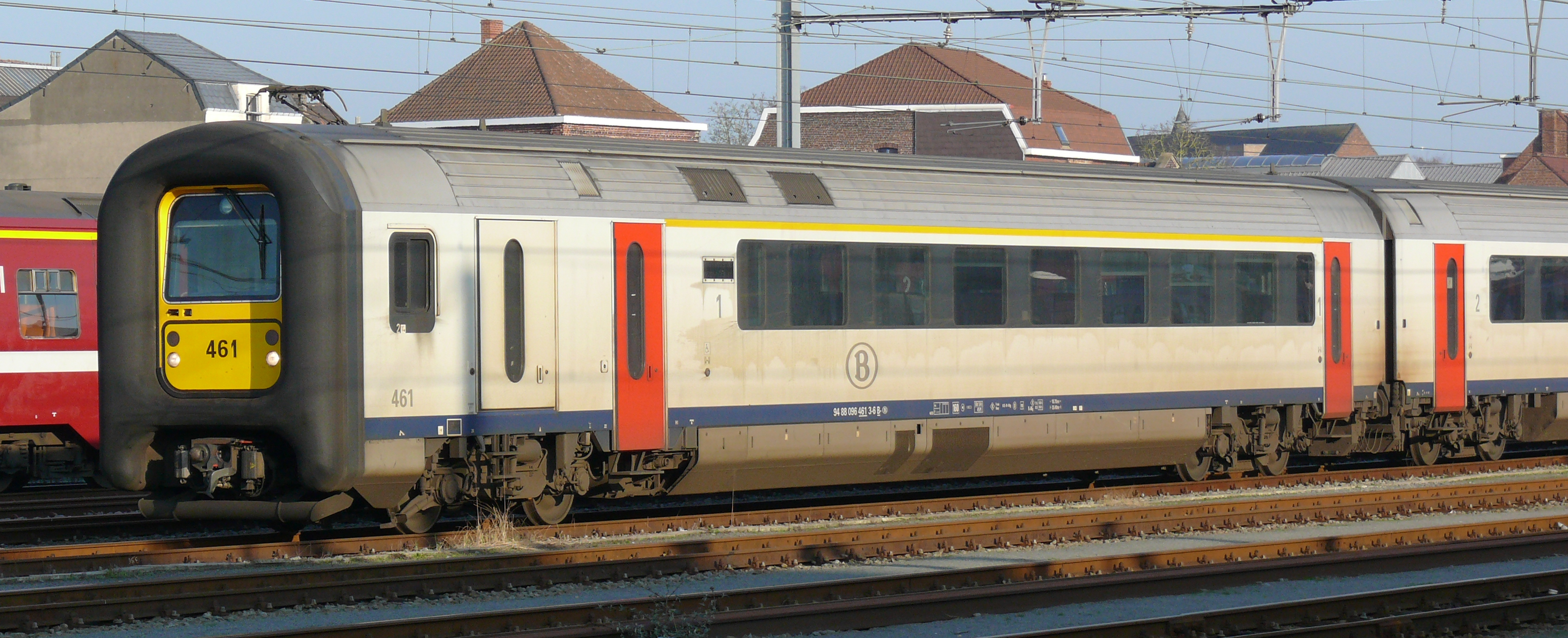
- AM96 unit 461 was at the rear of the passenger train that collided with the freight train.

- Location within Belgium

Details
- Date: 5 June 2016; 23:03 (CEST)
- Location: Hermalle-sous-Huy, Belgium
- Coordinates: 50°33′40″N 5°20′37″E
- Country: Belgium
- Line: Liège–Namur railway line
- Operator: SNCB
- Incident type: Rear-end collision
- Cause: Under investigation

Statistics
- Trains: 2
- Passengers: 40
- Deaths: 3
- Injured: 36 (9 serious)
- Damage: Two carriages and a wagon severely damaged. 15 metres (16 yd) track and 50 metres (55 yd) sleepers damaged

The Hermalle-sous-Huy train collision was a collision between a passenger train and a freight train in Hermalle-sous-Huy, Belgium, on 5 June 2016. At least three people were killed and 36 others were injured, nine of them seriously.

== The crash ==
The crash occurred at 23:03 CEST (21:03 UTC), when the passenger train crashed into the rear of the goods train while the two trains were on the same line. The driver of the passenger train was one of the fatalities. All on board had been rescued from the train by 02:00 on 6 June. Those less seriously injured were taken to Flône Abbey, or a nearby sports centre. The passenger train comprised two SNCB Class AM96 electric multiple units. It was travelling from Mouscron to Liers via Namur and Liège. The freight train had about 30 wagons in its consist.

The front two carriages of unit 548 were severely damaged. Unit 461 was at the rear of the train. It had about 40 passengers on board. The passenger train was travelling at about 90 kilometres per hour (56 mph) when it ran into the rear of the freight train, which was either stationary, or travelling at 10 to 15 kilometres per hour (6 to 9 mph). It was reported that an earlier lightning strike had caused disruption on the Liège–Namur railway line. A signal fault had been reported at 21:30, but was said to have been cleared at the time of the accident. Belgian Prime Minister Charles Michel tweeted his condolences to the victims and wished the injured a speedy recovery. He and King Philippe visited the site of the accident on 6 June.

Following the accident, it was revealed that the signal that was passed at danger was not equipped with the TBL 1+ train protection system, which is capable of automatic brake application if a train passes a red signal. This system was introduced following the Buizingen train crash in 2010.

The train event recorders of the passenger train were recovered from the wreckage on 8 June in an apparently undamaged condition. Infrabel stated that repairs to the tracks to allow single-line working for intercity trains would be completed by 8 June, with local trains being replaced by buses. It was intended that all track repairs would be completed by the evening of 9 June, which was achieved. Normal service resumed that day. Damage to the track required the replacement of 15 metres (16 yd) of rail and 50 metres (55 yd) of sleepers.

== Investigation ==
The Railway Accident and Incident Investigation Unit of the Federal Public Service Mobility and Transport opened an investigation into the accident.

The train event recorder revealed that the driver of the train passed a signal displaying a double yellow (caution) aspect. (Note: A double yellow signal means that the signal ahead is showing a red (danger) aspect. See Belgian railway signalling for further details.) However, he only started to brake when the freight train came in sight. The investigation resulted in an intermediate report being published in June 2017. It concluded that it was likely that the passenger train overran a red signal.
