= Tournai railway station =

Railway station in Hainaut, Belgium

Coordinates: 50.613°N 3.3966°E

Tournai
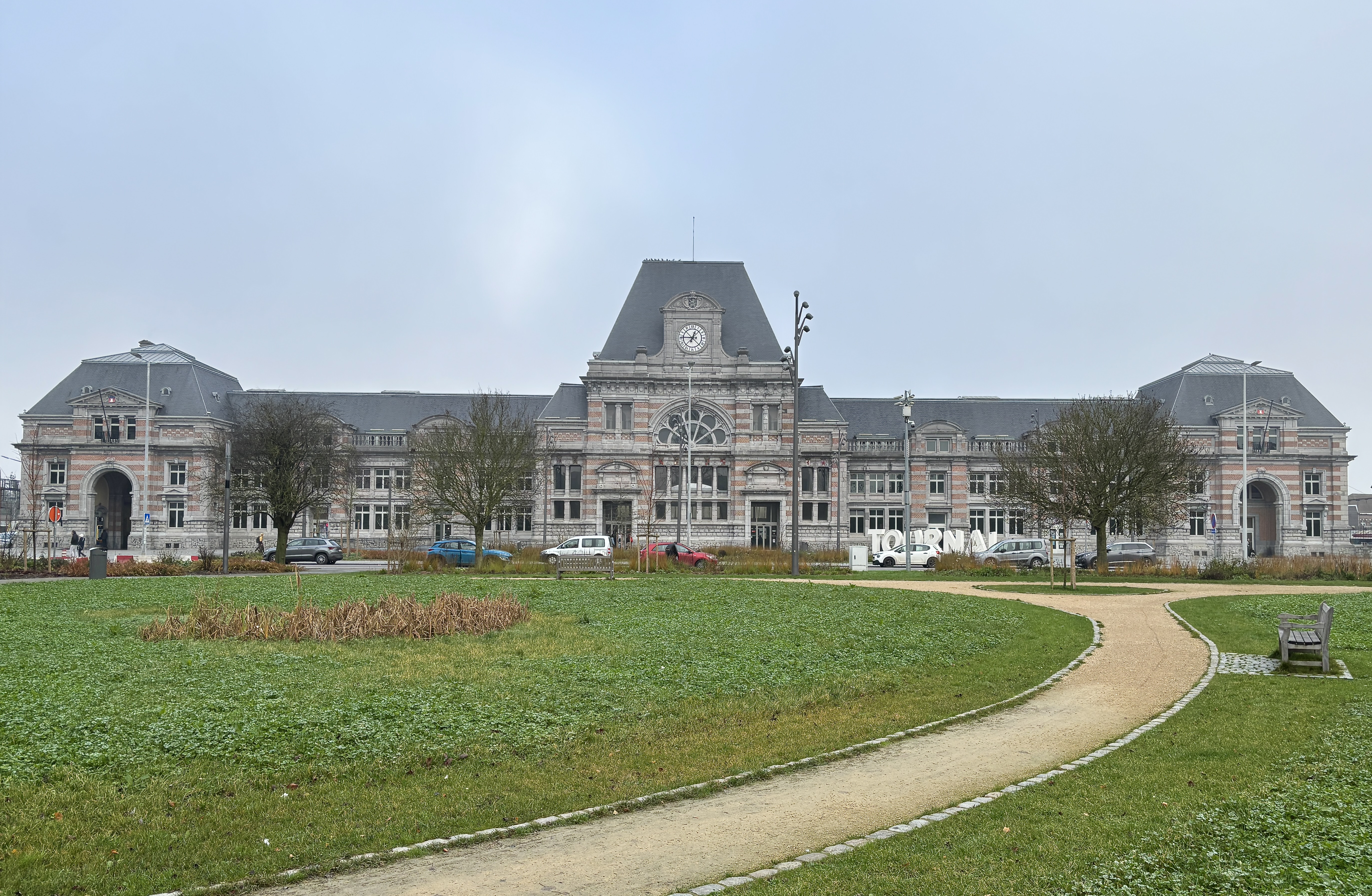
- Tournai railway station

General information
- Location: Place Crombez, 7500 Tournai; Belgium
- Elevation: 22 m (72 ft)
- System: Railway Station
- Owner: SNCB/NMBS
- Operator: SNCB/NMBS
- Lines: 94, 78
- Platforms: 3
- Tracks: 7

Construction
- Architect: Henri Beyaert

Other information
- Station code: FTY

History
- Opened: 24 October 1842; 183 years ago
Location
- Location within Belgium Location within Europe

Tournai railway station (French: Gare du Tournai; Dutch: Station Doornik) (Note: Officially Tournai (French: Tournai; Dutch: Doornik)) is a railway station in Tournai, Hainaut, Belgium, situated on railway line 94. It is operated by the National Railway Company of Belgium (SNCB/NMBS).

== History ==
Tournai railway station soon after its completion in 1879

The first train arrived there on 24 January 1842. A first neoclassical stone building dating from the 1840s was later dismantled and replaced to serve as the railway station of the town of Leuze-en-Hainaut.

The current station building was designed by the architect Henri Beyaert and erected between 1874 and 1879. The monumental building originally included a glass and iron construction covering the platforms and rails, and a freight station located in a separate building conceived in the form of a late-medieval Flemish cloth hall.

The buildings were severely damaged during World War II. The structure covering the platforms and tracks was demolished and replaced by simple awnings covering the platforms.

== Train services ==
The station is served by the following services:

- Intercity services (IC-06) Tournai - Ath - Halle - Brussels - Brussels Airport
- Intercity services (IC-19) Lille - Tournai - Saint-Ghislain - Mons - Charleroi - Namur
- Intercity services (IC-25) Mouscron - Tournai - Saint-Ghislain - Mons - Charleroi - Namur - Huy - Liege - Liers (weekends)
- Intercity services (IC-26) Kortrijk - Tournai - Halle - Brussels - Dendermonde - Lokeren - Sint Niklaas (weekdays)
- Local services (L-29) Tournai - Saint-Ghislain - Mons - Ath - Geraardsbergen (weekdays)
- Local services (TER Hauts-de-France P81) Tournai - Ascq - Lille

Preceding station	NMBS/SNCB	Following station
Terminus	IC 06	Leuze towards Brussels National Airport
Froyennes towards Lille-Flandres	IC 19	Saint-Ghislain towards Namur
Hersaux towards Mouscron	IC 25 weekends	Antoing towards Liers
Froyennes towards Kortrijk	IC 26 weekdays	Leuze towards Sint-Niklaas
Terminus	L 29 weekdays	Antoing towards Geraardsbergen
Preceding station	TER Hauts-de-France	Following station
Froyennes towards Lille-Flandres	Proxi P81	Terminus

== Gallery ==
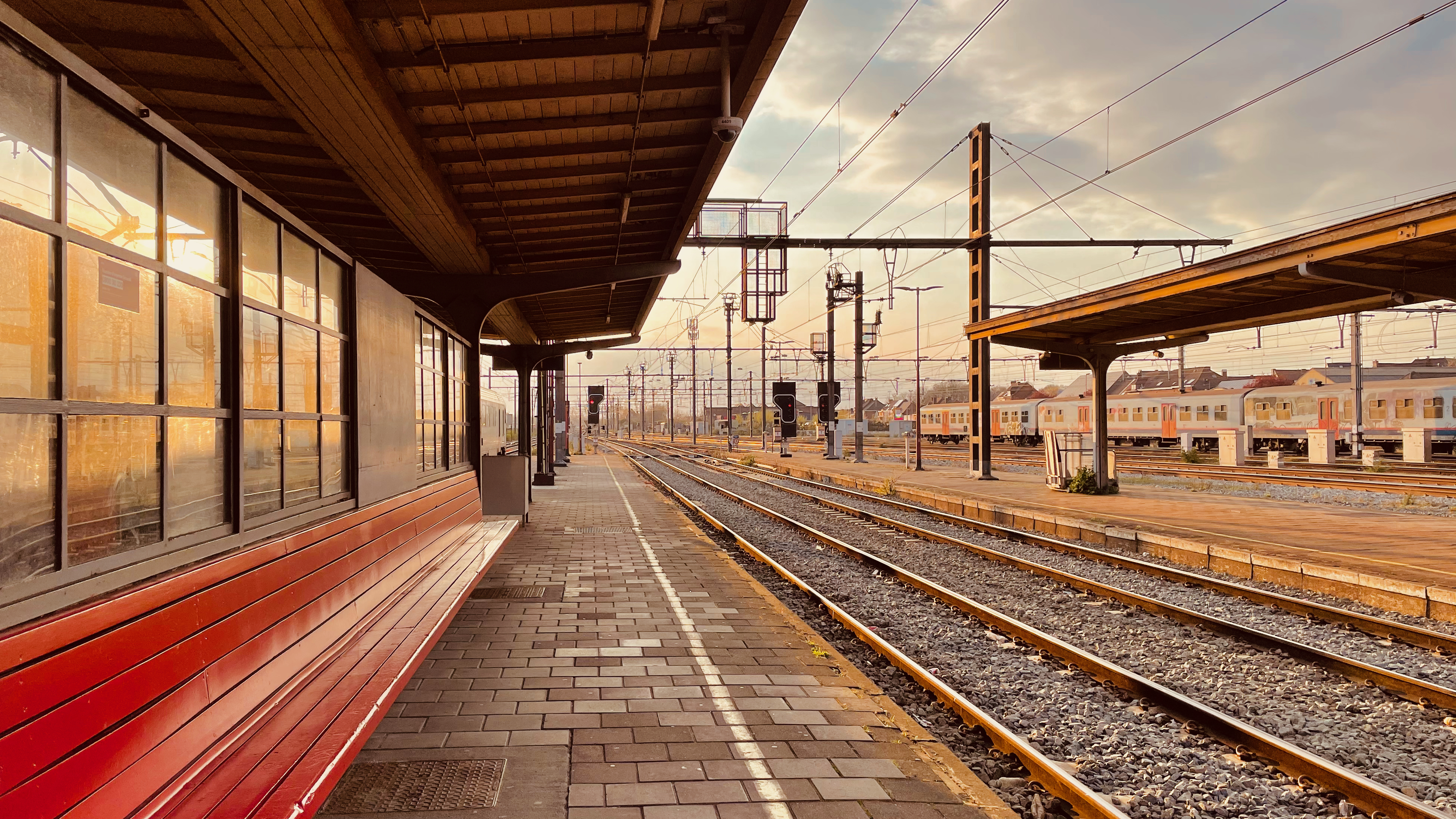
View of the platforms and tracks

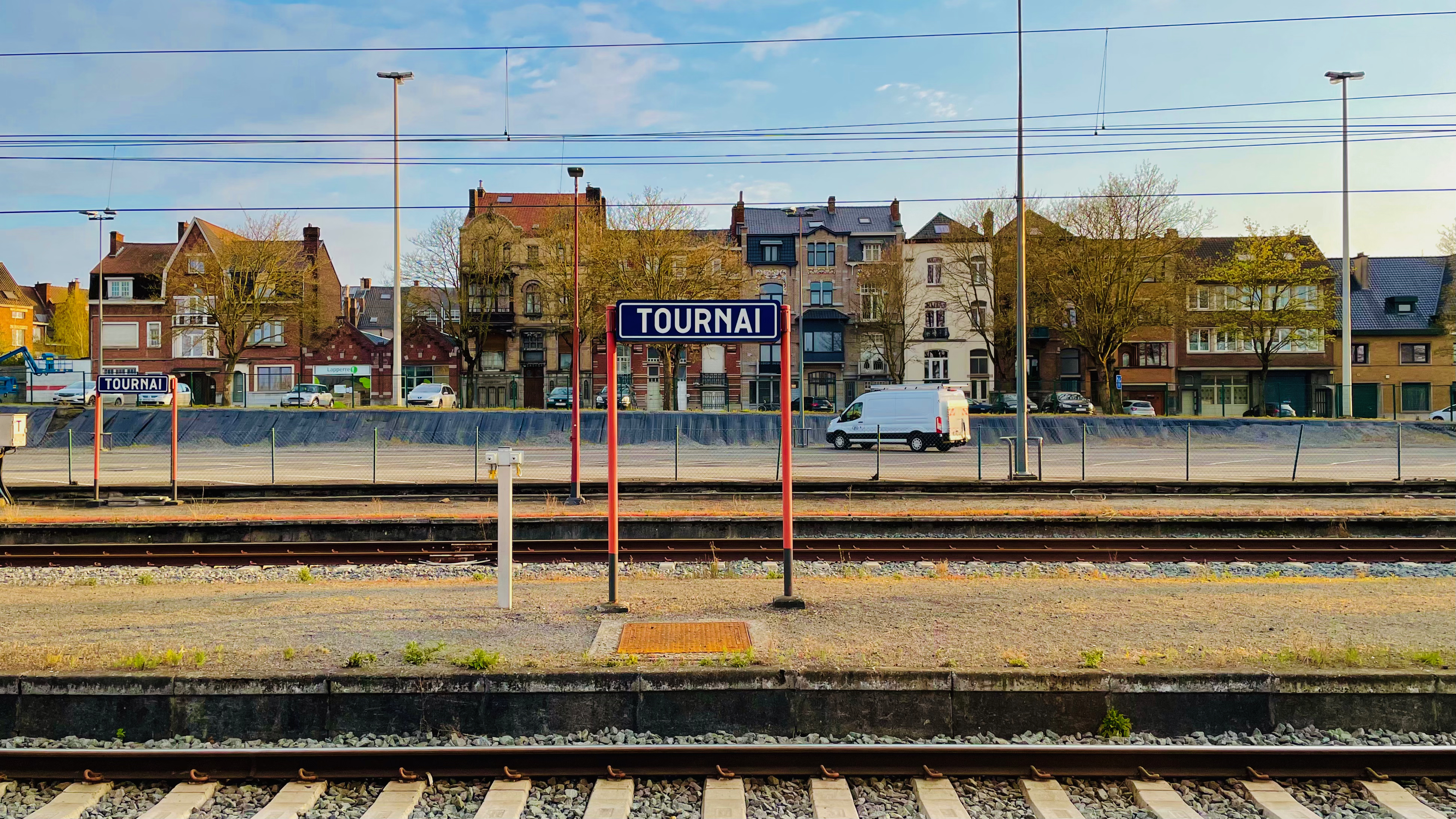
Place name sign on a platform

== See also ==
- List of railway stations in Belgium
- Rail transport in Belgium
