= Roeselare railway station =

Railway station in West Flanders, Belgium

Roeselare
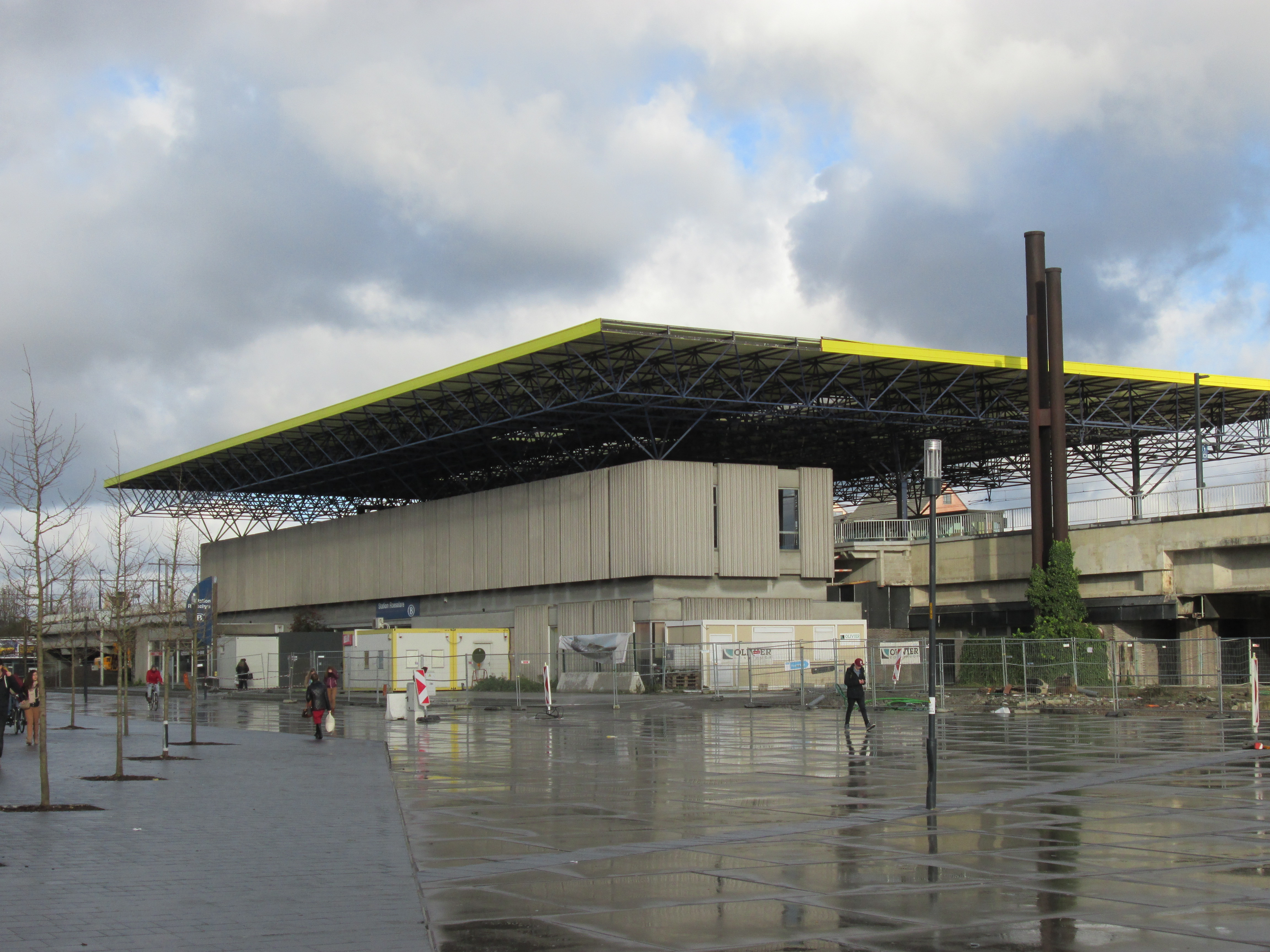

General information
- Coordinates: 50°56′56″N 3°7′49″E
- System: Railway Station
- Owner: National Railway Company of Belgium
- Line: 66 (Bruges-Kortrijk)
- Platforms: 2
- Tracks: 3

Construction
- Parking: 1 underground
- Cycle facilities: 2 parkings

Other information
- Station code: FRL

History
- Opened: 31 March 1847
Location

Station Roeselare is a Belgian railway station on the railway line 66 (Brugge – Kortrijk) in the city of Roeselare.

== History ==
The station is the terminal station of the old abolished line 64 (Ypres – Roeselare) and the also abolished line 65 (Roeselare – Menen – French frontier).

The station is situated on walking distance from the city centre. Each quarter of an hour, a train stops in Roeselare, among which L-trains to Bruges and Kortrijk, and the IC-trains to Bruges-Ostend (Brugge-Oostende) and Kortrijk-Lille or Brussels.

Outside, there is a bus station with 11 platforms where you can take a town-bus or regional bus.

== Infrastructure ==
The station lies on a raising verge. There is a big yellow metal roof above the platforms. Because of the open roof construction, there are almost no walls around the platforms but some shelters protect the travellers against the wind. There are 3 tracks and 2 platforms. On the upper storey, there are a few offices. Formerly, signal-station 'Bloc 10' regulated the railway-traffic in the station. The platforms can be reached by stairs, escalators or by lift. Downstairs there are a ticket office and several shops.

== Renovation ==
The railway station from 1977 doesn't meet certain modern requirements concerning comfort, customer friendliness and reaching.

When the station was built in 1976–1979, it looked modern at the time with a raising railway that replaced four level crossings. At the end of 2007, the municipality and several partners of public transport organizations decided to modernize the neighbourhood of the station. Together they invested 35 million euro. The work was planned to be done in 2012 but they worked on the new railway-station till the summer of 2018. Meanwhile, the construction of the underground parking and the new bus station have been completed.

Thanks to this renovation, the railway station has turned into a transferring point between different parts of town.

== Railway line to Ghent ==
In the 'Neptunusplan', it has been suggested to improve the train-service between Roeselare and Ghent by means of a new railway junction between the railway-lines 66 and 73, near the village of Gits. Faster train-services via Kortrijk are possible too.
