= Belgian railway line 130A =

Railway line in Belgium

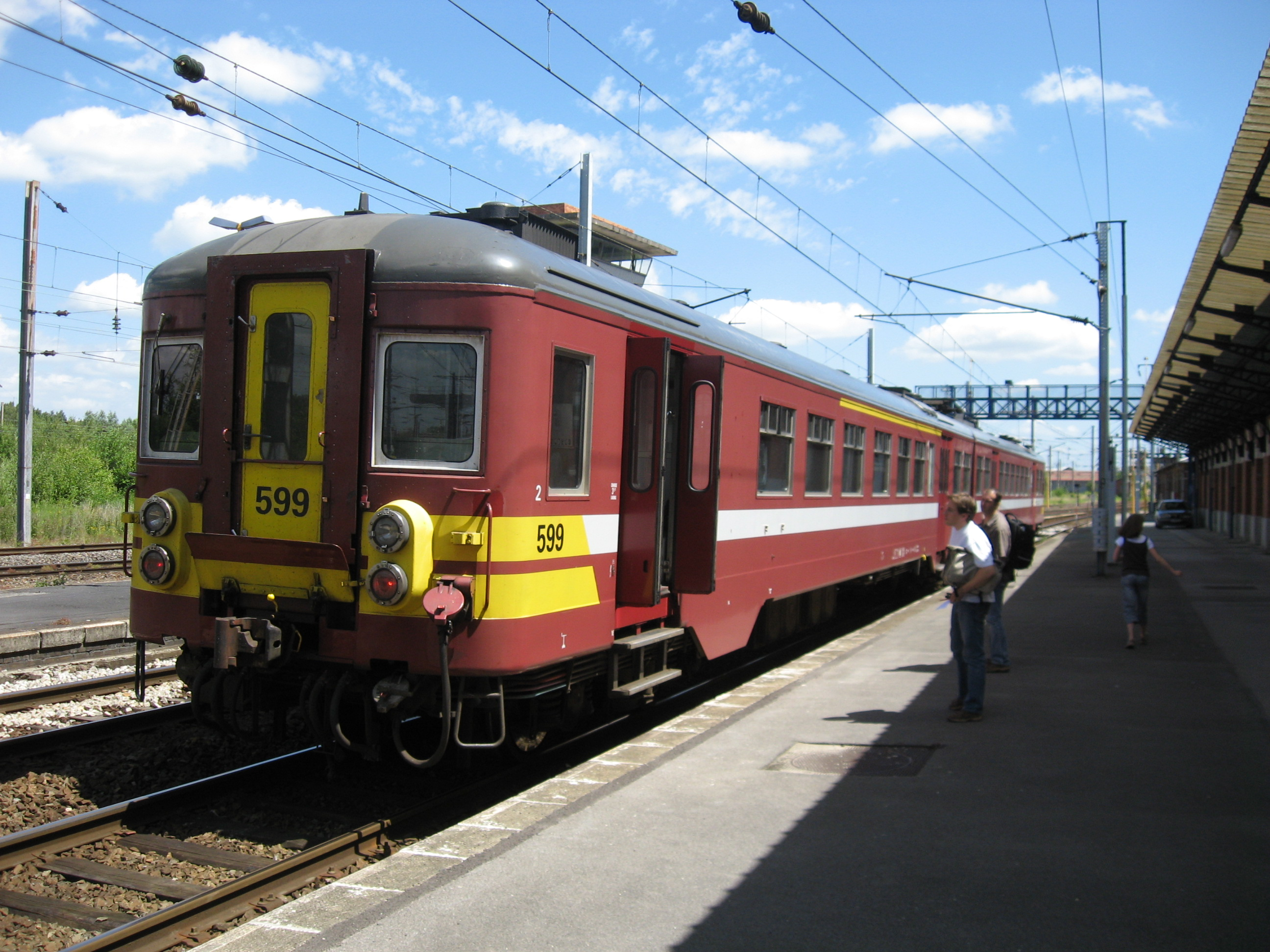
- A train at Jeumont station in 2008

Overview
- Status: Operational
- Locale: Belgium
- Termini: Charleroi-Sud railway station; French border near Erquelinnes

Service
Services
- Operator(s): National Railway Company of Belgium

History
- Opened: 1852

Technical
- Line length: 29 km (18 mi)
- Number of tracks: double track
- Track gauge: 1,435 mm (4 ft 8 1/2 in) standard gauge
- Electrification: 3 kV DC
Route map
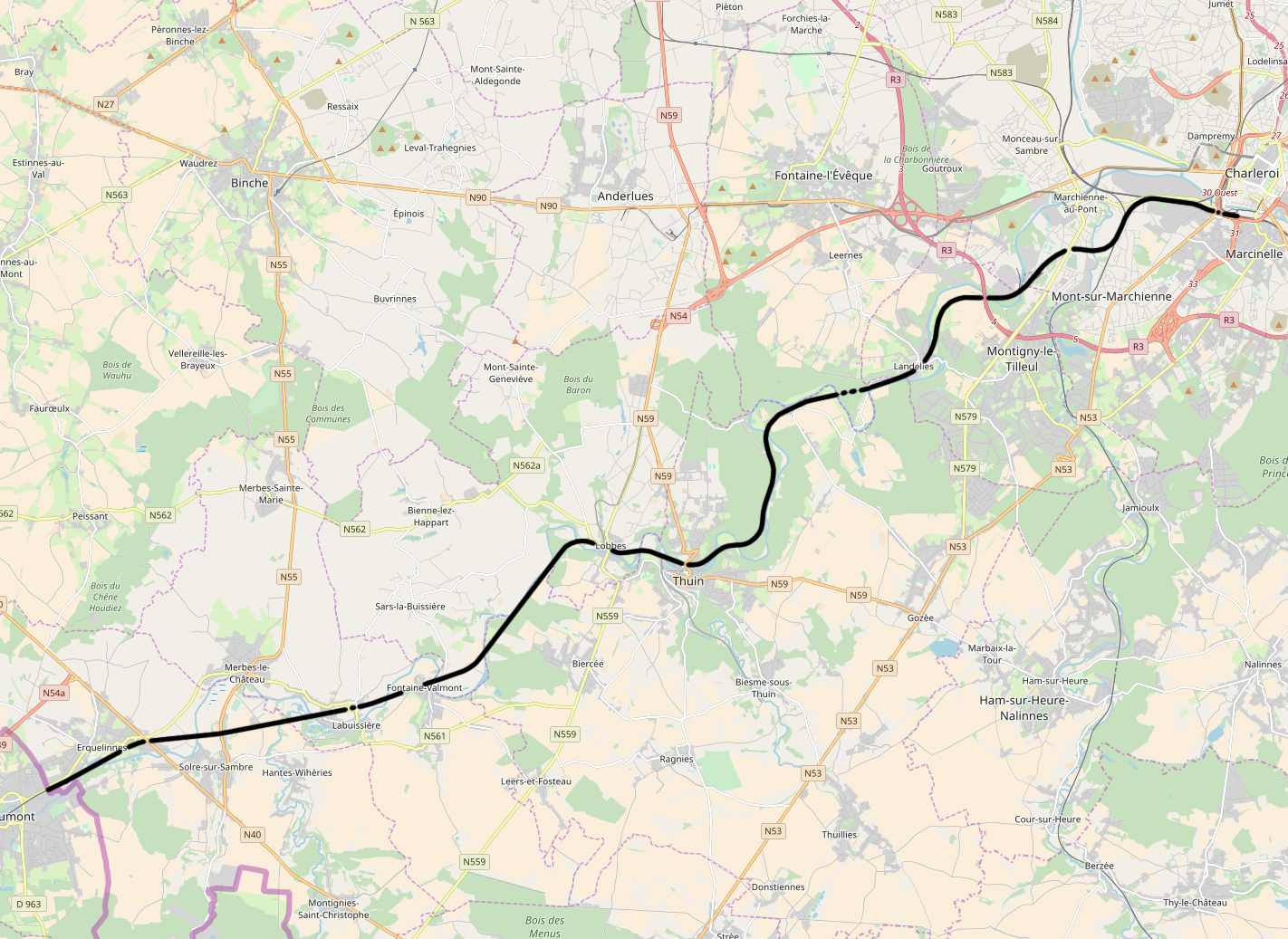

The Belgian railway line 130A is a railway line in Belgium connecting Charleroi with the French border near Erquelinnes. Completed in 1852, the line runs 29.3 km. It runs along the river Sambre, crossing it several times. Beyond Erquelinnes, a French railway line continues towards Jeumont, Saint-Quentin and Paris. Until the opening of the Paris–Brussels–Cologne high-speed lines, international passenger trains between Paris and Cologne traveled along line 130A.

== Stations ==
The main interchange stations on line 130A are:

- Charleroi-Sud: to Brussels, Ottignies, Couvin, Namur and Mons
- Erquelinnes: to Jeumont
