= Belgian railway line 130 =

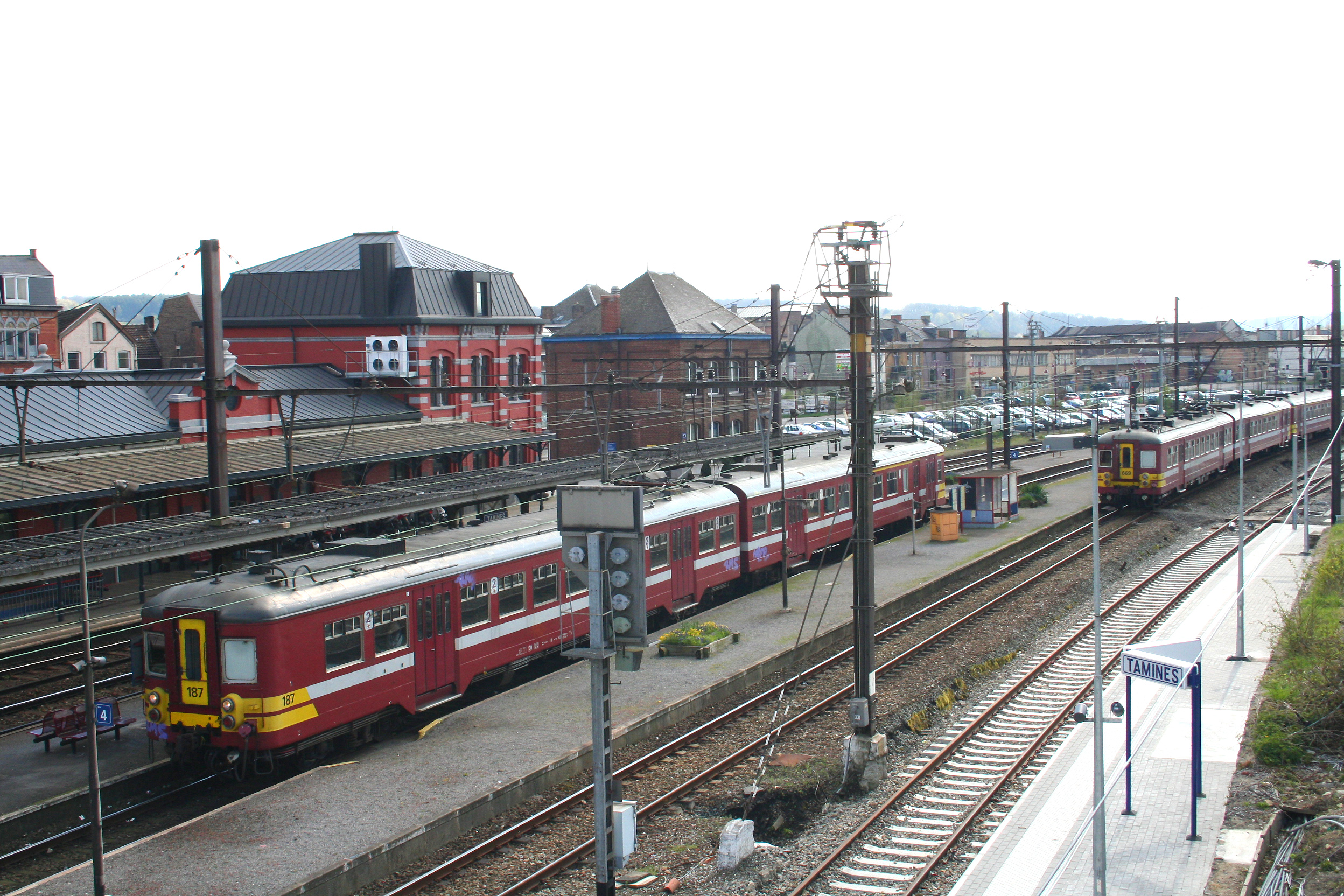
- Trains at Tamines station in 2008

Overview
- Status: Operational
- Locale: Belgium
- Termini: Namur railway station; Charleroi-Sud railway station

Service
Services
- Operator(s): National Railway Company of Belgium

History
- Opened: 1843

Technical
- Line length: 37 km (23 mi)
- Number of tracks: double track
- Track gauge: 1,435 mm (4 ft 8 1/2 in) standard gauge
- Electrification: 3 kV DC
Route map
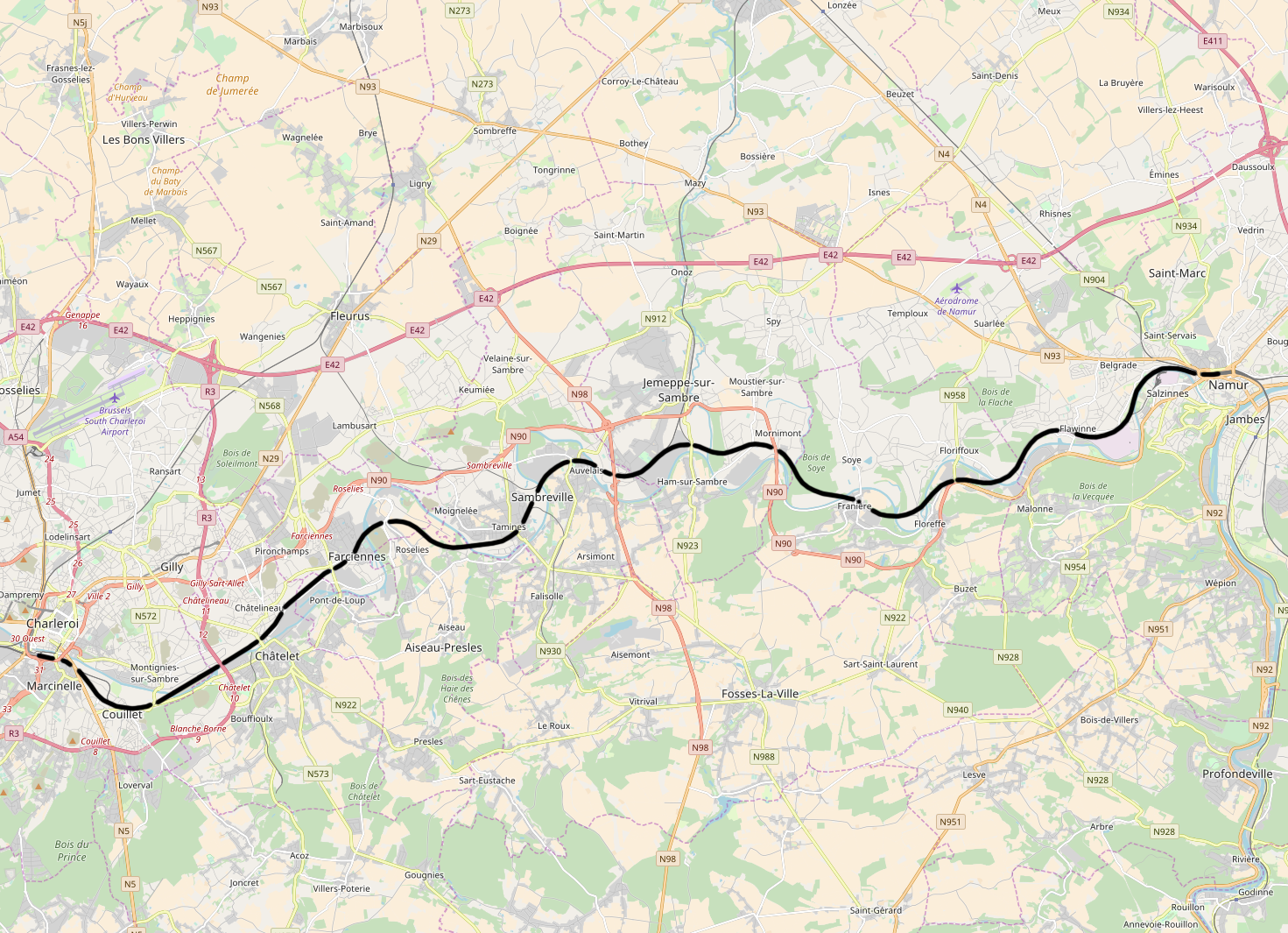

The Belgian railway line 130 is a railway line in Belgium connecting Namur and Charleroi. Completed in 1843, the line runs 36.6 km. It runs along the river Sambre, crossing it several times.

== Stations ==
The main interchange stations on line 130 are:

- Namur: to Brussels, Luxembourg City, Dinant and Liège
- Jemeppe-sur-Sambre: to Gembloux
- Charleroi-Sud: to Brussels, Ottignies, Couvin, Erquelinnes and Mons
