= Belgian railway line 54 =

Belgian-Dutch railway line

Overview
- Status: Operational
- Locale: Belgium
- Termini: Sint-Niklaas railway station Terneuzen railway station; Mechelen railway station

Service
- Operator: National Railway Company of Belgium

History
- Opened: 1870-1871
- Closed: De Klinge - Axel (1968); Sint-Niklaas - De Klinge (1975)

Technical
- Line length: 66.7 km (41 mi)
- Number of tracks: single track
- Track gauge: 1,435 mm (4 ft 8 1/2 in) standard gauge
- Electrification: 3 kV DC
- Operating speed: 120 km/h (75 mph)
Route map
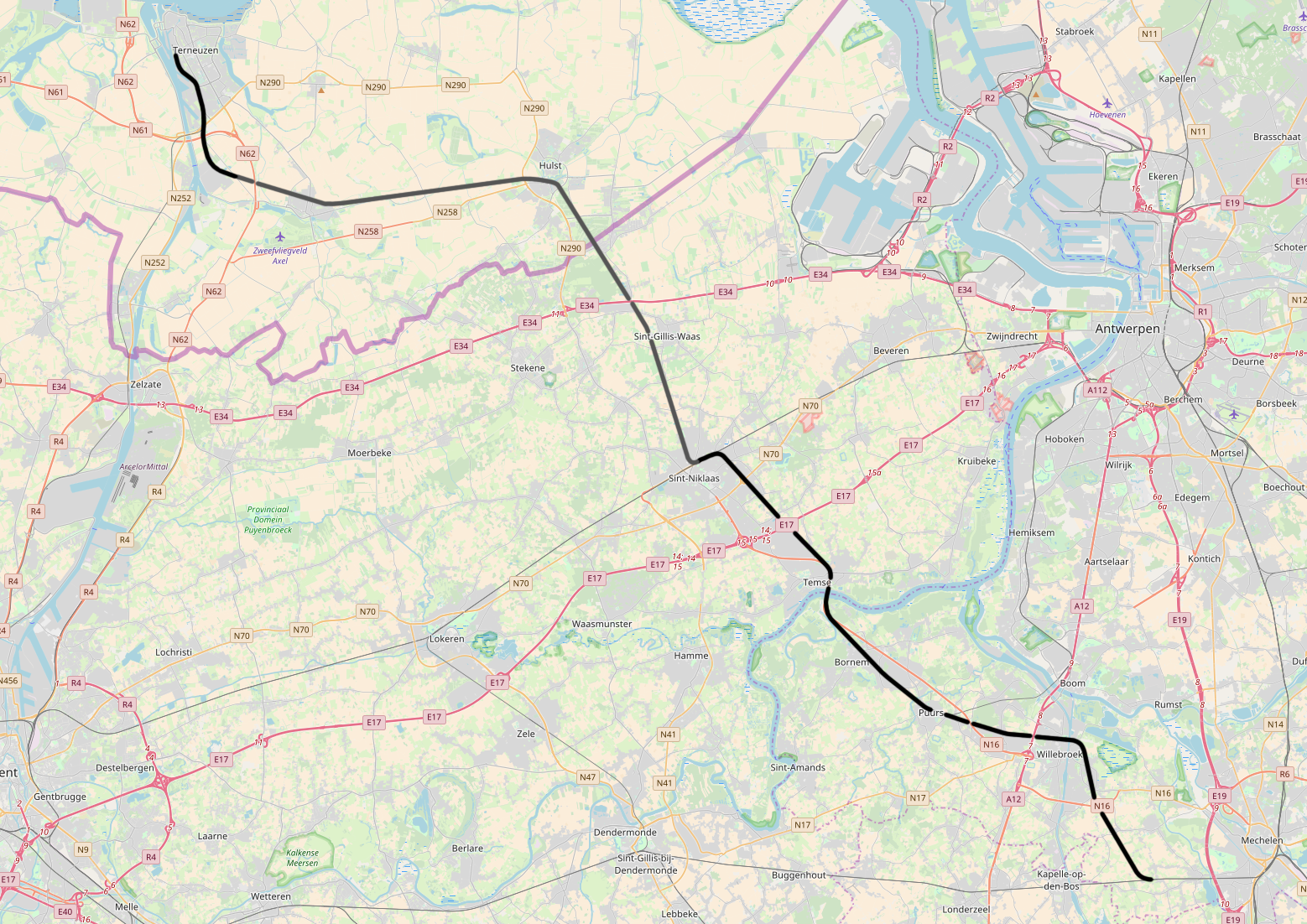

The Belgian railway line 54 is a Belgian railway line that runs from Mechelen to Sint-Niklaas, formerly to Terneuzen which had a total length of about 67 kilometers.

== History ==
This railway line was built and used by a private rail company that was founded in 1861, Société Anonyme du Chemin de Fer International de Malines à Terneuzen. The goal of this north-south connection was to increase profit from the coal coming from Charleroi. On the other hand, it was built to stimulate international transport throughout Belgium. The railway played a very important economic and social role in the mobility of the provinces of East Flanders and Antwerp, in particual the regions of Waasland and Klein-Brabant. The headquarters of the railway company was located in Sint-Niklaas. Temse, Bornem, Puurs and Willebroek partially financed the construction of the railway. In the Netherlands, the railway line mainly served the port of Terneuzen in an effort to increase the sales of agriculture products coming from Zeelandic Flanders.

Along the trajectory of the railway, three bridges needed to be built: in Willebroek, Temse and Sluiskil. The bridge in Temse, which was the hardest one, was designed by the French engineer Gustave Eiffel, who would later build the Eiffel Tower. It's the widest bridge crossing the Scheldt (343 meters or 0.21 miles). The bridge was completed in 1870. In the same year, the first passenger service between Mechelen and Temse started being used. During World War I, the bridge was heavily damaged but remained in service. The bridge was repaired in 1924. The railway company had an enormous success during the 1920s. The economic crisis in the 1930s caused a turnaround, which was only aggravated by World War II. In May 1940, the bridge was blown up out of strategic reasons by Belgian and French military engineers. The Second World War meant the end for the railway company. In 1948, the management of the line was transferred to the National Railway Company of Belgium for the Belgian part and to the Dutch Railways in the Netherlands. The railway company was officially disbanded in 1951.

=== Possible closure ===
In September 2021, some documents from Infrabel leaked into the press, stating that Infrabel is considering closing the line, together with three other railway lines. This consideration would be a response to the savings the federal government would want to impose on the company. Because the company got a lot of backlash, Infrabel decided not to close the line.

== Current situation ==
The railway consists of a single track, which is electrified between Mechelen and Sint-Niklaas. It is possible to cross other trains in every station along the line, except for the one in Bornem.

On October 6, 1951, all passenger services between Hulst and Terneuzen were disbanded and on May 18, 1952 between Sint-Niklaas and Hulst. The freight traffic was disbanded in October 1975 between Sint-Niklaas and De Klinge. Today, there is a hiking and bicycle path out of asphalt between Sint-Niklaas and Hulst where the tracks used to be. This path is part of the Belgian and Dutch numbered-node cycle network. The Dutch part of the railway still exists as a non-electrified (mostly) single-track railway from the city of Terneuzen through the industrial area of Sluiskil and ends in the business area of Axel.

== Train services ==
The National Railway Company of Belgium serves the line with local trains and rush hour trains. During the week, the local trains run from Sint-Niklaas to Leuven via Mechelen and during the weekend, the service is limited to Mechelen. There are also rush hour services between Sint-Niklaas and Mechelen and between Sint-Niklaas and Leuven.

== Gallery ==
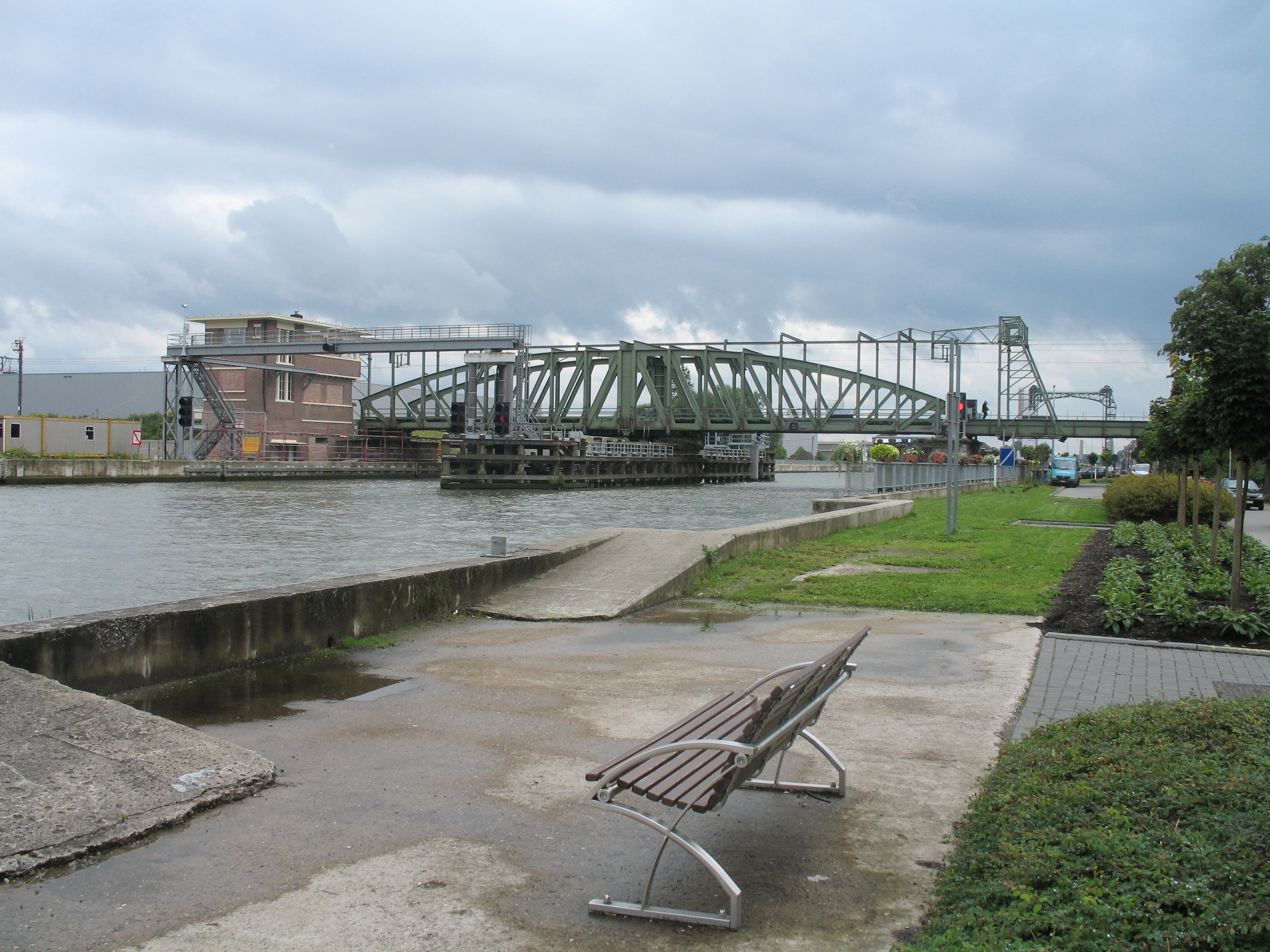
IJzerenbrug (Iron Bridge) in Willebroek crossing the Brussels–Scheldt Maritime Canal

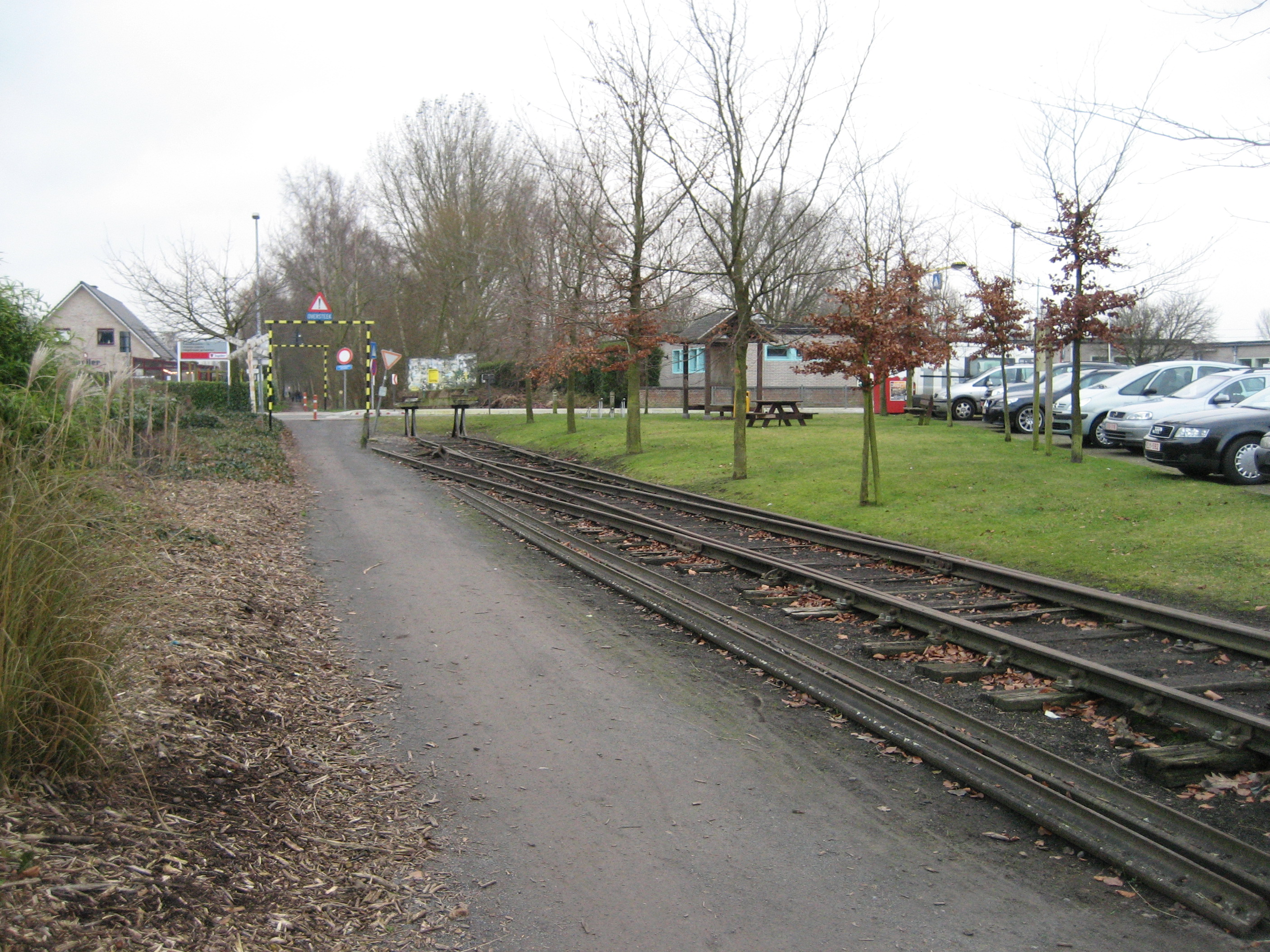
Remnants of the old tracks in De Klinge

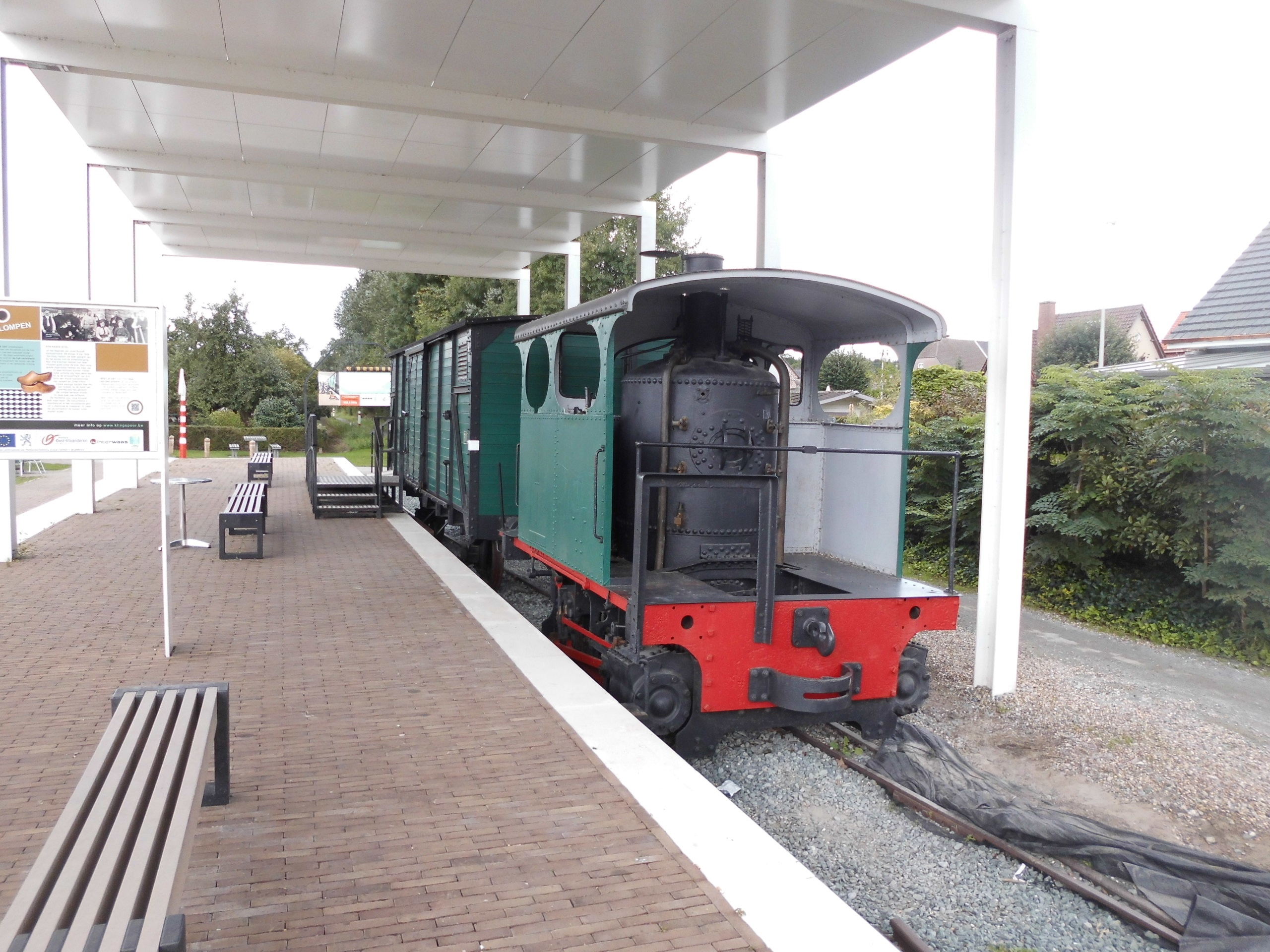
Former location of the station of De Klinge

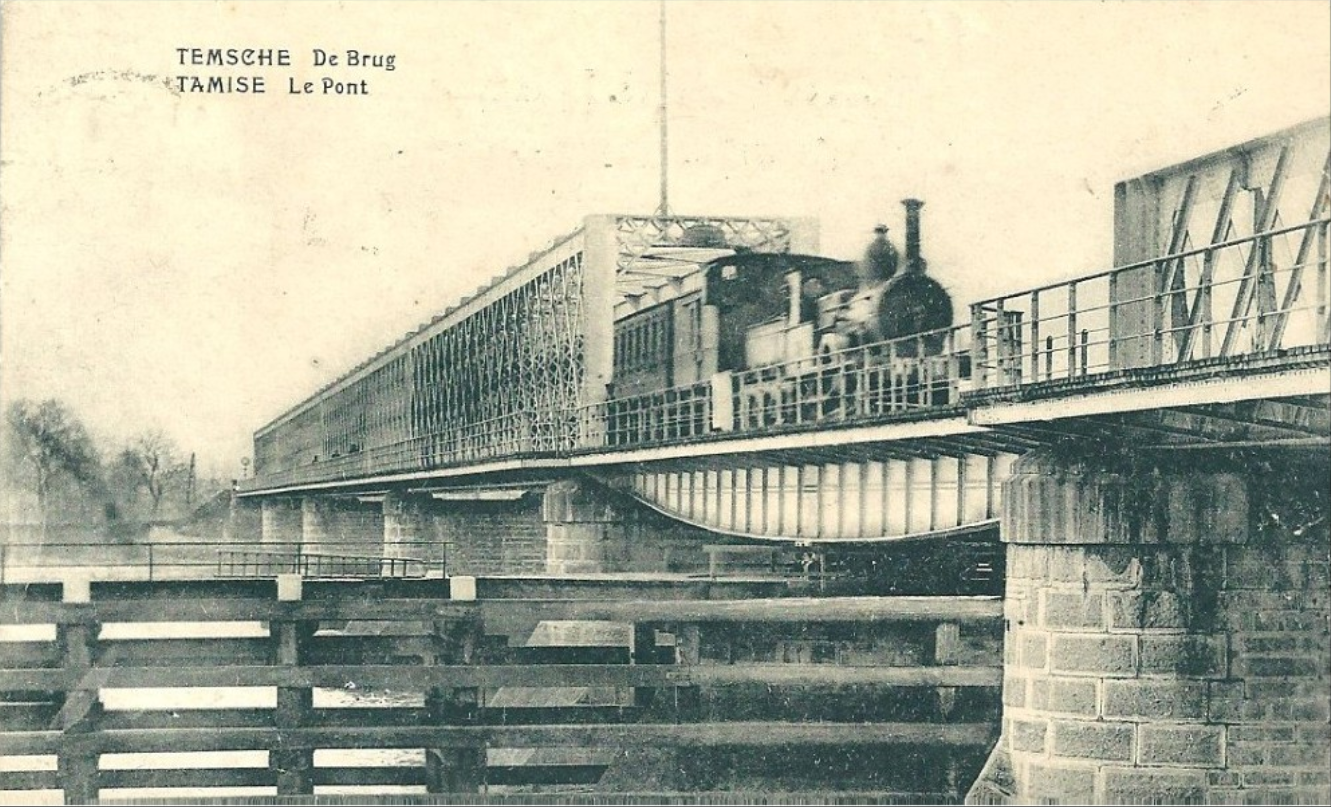
The first bridge crossing the Scheldt in Temse (1870-1940)
