= Belgian railway line 94 =

Railway line in Belgium

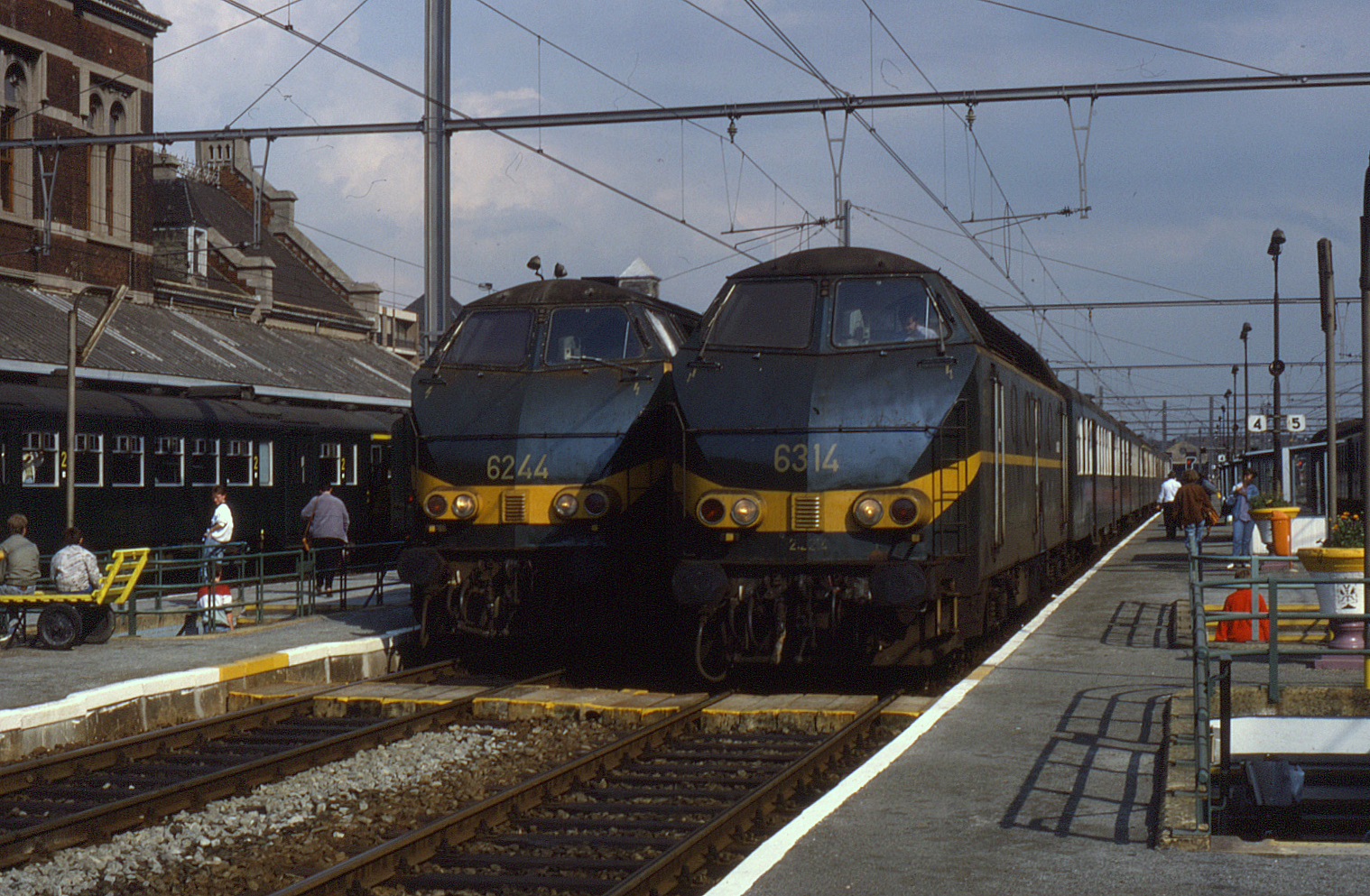
- Two passenger trains hauled by Class 62 locomotives at Ath station in 1987

Overview
- Status: Operational
- Locale: Belgium
- Termini: Halle railway station; French border near Baisieux

Service
Services
- Operator(s): National Railway Company of Belgium and Eurostar (on diversion only)

History
- Opened: 1847–1985

Technical
- Line length: 78 km (48 mi) (Belgian part)
- Number of tracks: double track
- Track gauge: 1,435 mm (4 ft 8 1/2 in) standard gauge
- Electrification: 3 kV DC
Route map
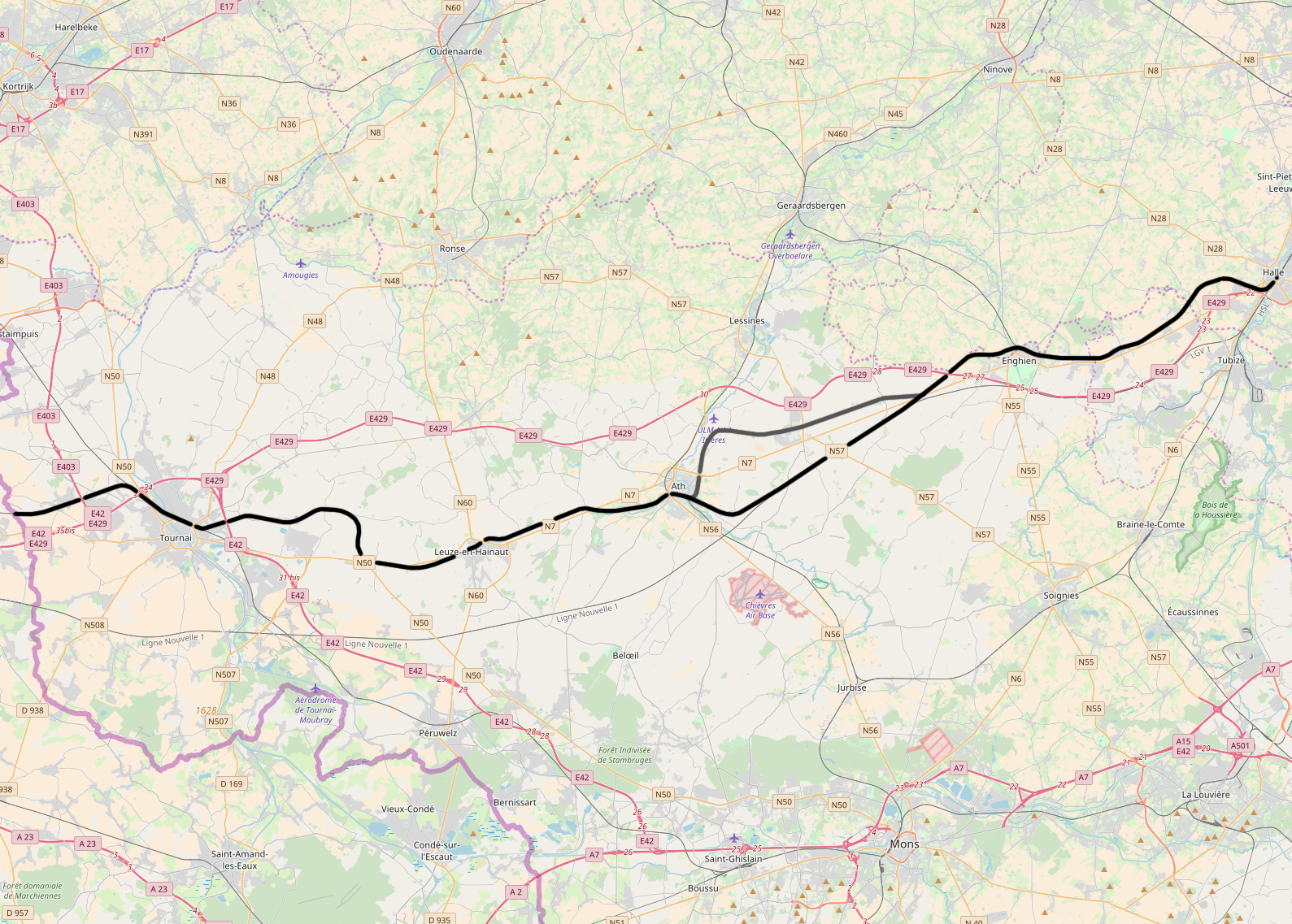

The Belgian railway line 94 is a railway line in Belgium connecting Halle with Tournai and the French border near Baisieux. Beyond Baisieux the line continues to the French city Lille. The line was opened between 1847 and 1866, and a section between Ath and Enghien was straightened in 1985.

== Stations ==
The main interchange stations on line 94 are:

- Halle: to Brussels and Mons
- Enghien: to Geraardsbergen
- Ath: to Geraardsbergen and Mons
- Tournai: to Kortrijk, Mons and Saint-Ghislain
