= Belgian railway line 162 =

Belgian railway line connecting Namur to the Luxembourg border

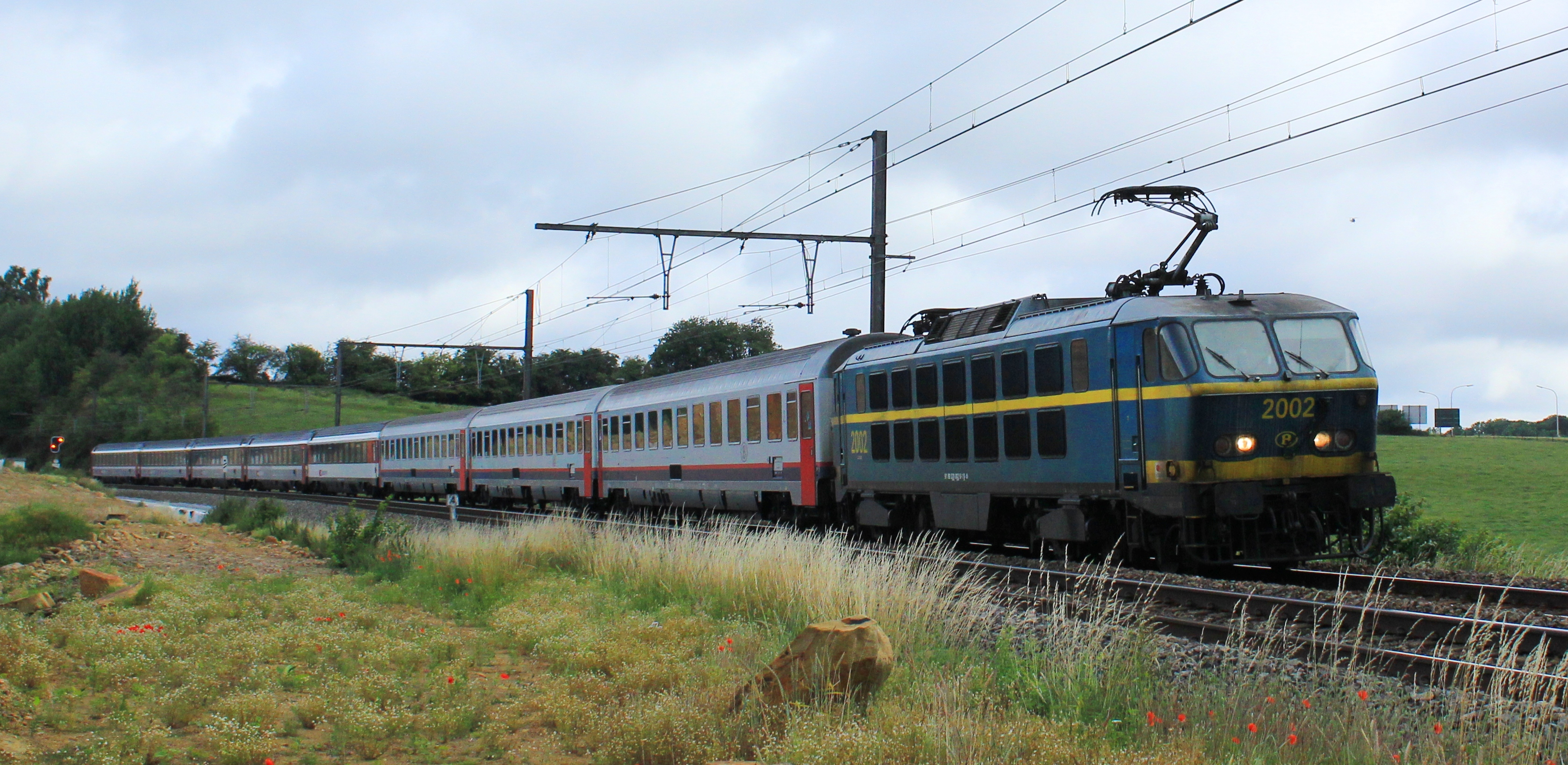
- Express Vauban in Florée in 2011

Overview
- Status: Operational
- Locale: Belgium
- Termini: Namur railway station; Luxembourg border near Arlon

Service
- Operator(s): National Railway Company of Belgium

History
- Opened: 1858-1859

Technical
- Line length: 147 km (91 mi)
- Number of tracks: double track
- Track gauge: 1,435 mm (4 ft 8 1/2 in) standard gauge
- Electrification: 3 kV DC
Route map
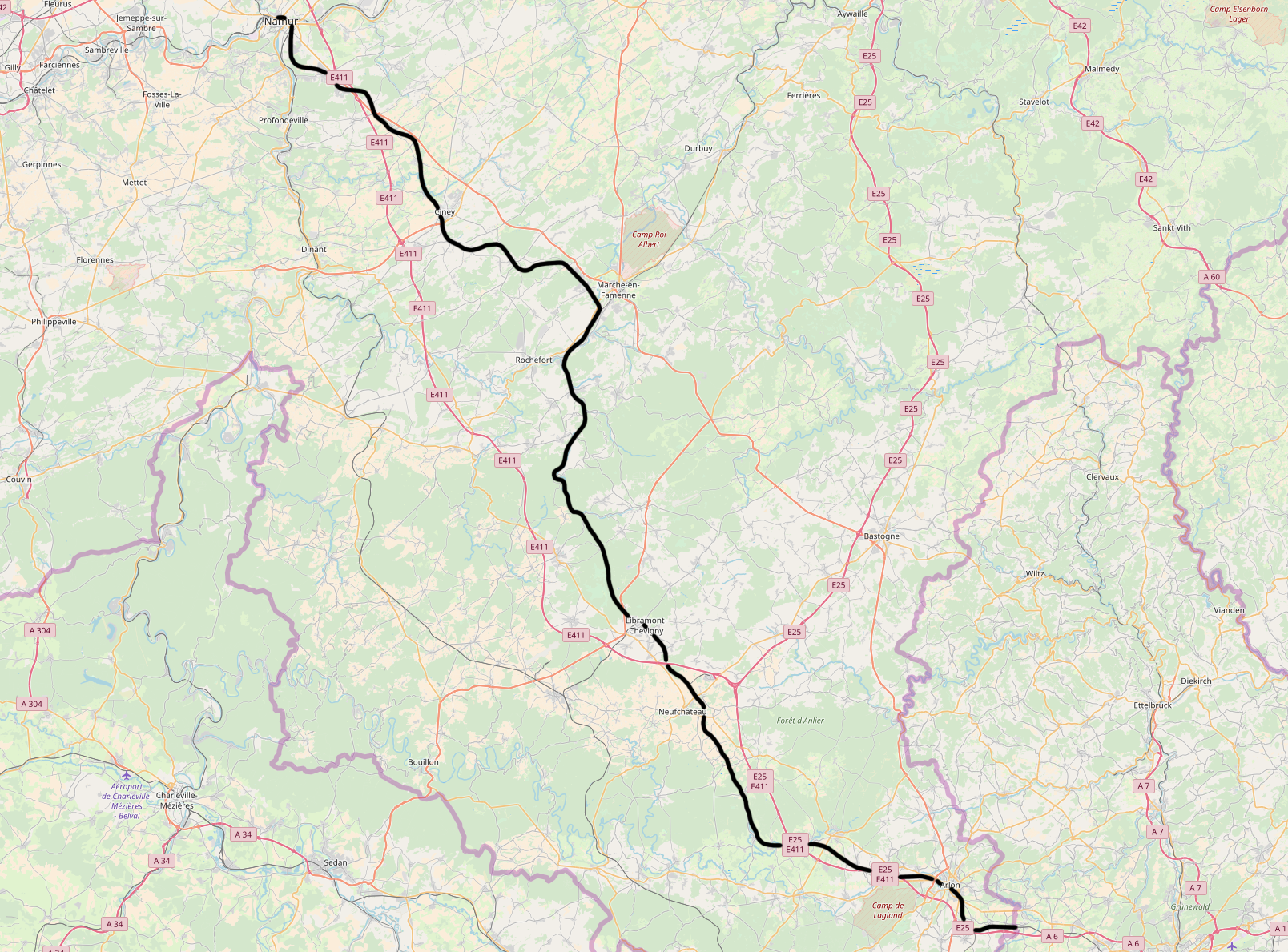

The Belgian railway line 162 is a railway line in Belgium connecting Namur to the Luxembourg border at Sterpenich (Arlon). Completed in 1859, the line runs 146.8 km. Together with the Belgian railway line 161 (Brussels – Namur) and the CFL Line 50 (Sterpenich – Luxembourg City), it forms the important rail link between Brussels and Luxembourg.

August 2022 work will start on having the electrification switched over to 25kV these works are part of a desire to increase the speed, load and frequency of rail traffic.

== Stations ==
The main interchange stations on line 162 are:

- Namur: to Brussels, Liège, Dinant and Charleroi
- Marloie: to Marche-en-Famenne and Liège
- Libramont: to Bertrix and Virton
- Arlon: to Athus and Rodange
