= Belgian railway line 37 =

Line from Liège, Belgium to Aachen, Germany

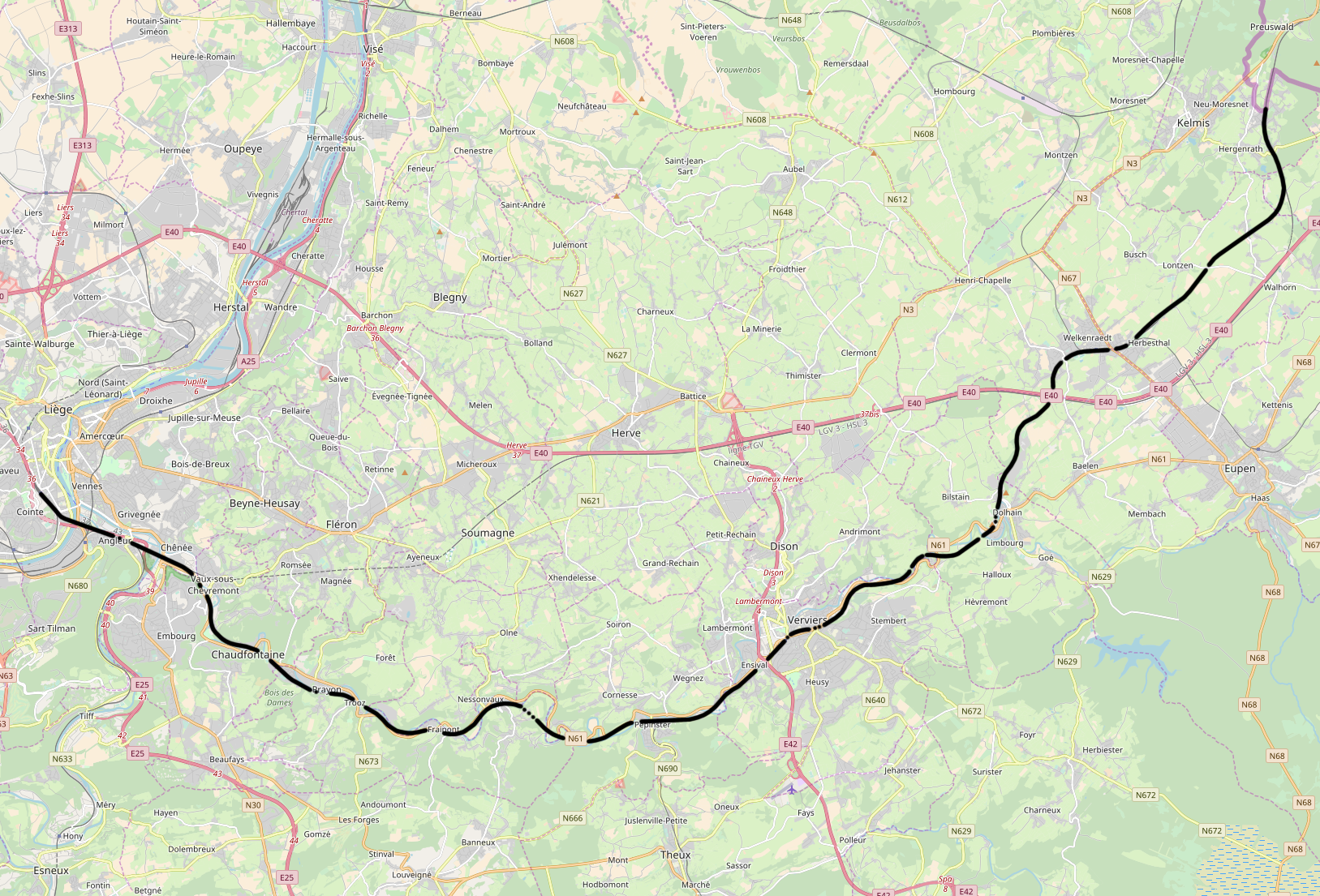

Overview
- Status: Operational
- Locale: Belgium, Germany
- Termini: Liège-Guillemins; Aachen Hauptbahnhof

Service
Services
- Operator: National Railway Company of Belgium

History
- Opened: 1842-1843

Technical
- Line length: 54 km (34 mi)
- Number of tracks: double track
- Track gauge: 1,435 mm (4 ft 8 1/2 in) standard gauge
- Electrification: since 1966 3 kV DC
- Operating speed: 140 km (87 mi)

The Belgian railway line 37 is a railway line in Belgium connecting Liège to Aachen in Germany. Completed in 1843, the line runs 47.4 km in Belgium. and another 6.8 km in Germany. It is the first and oldest cross-border railway line worldwide. Since 2009, high speed trains running between Brussels and Aachen use the HSL 3 instead of the line 37 between Chênée and Hergenrath.

== Stations ==
The main interchange stations on line 37 are:

- Liège-Guillemins: to Brussels, Namur, Maastricht and Hasselt
- Verviers-Central: to Spa
- Welkenraedt: to Eupen
- Aachen Hbf: to Mönchengladbach, Düsseldorf and Cologne
Belgian railway line 37

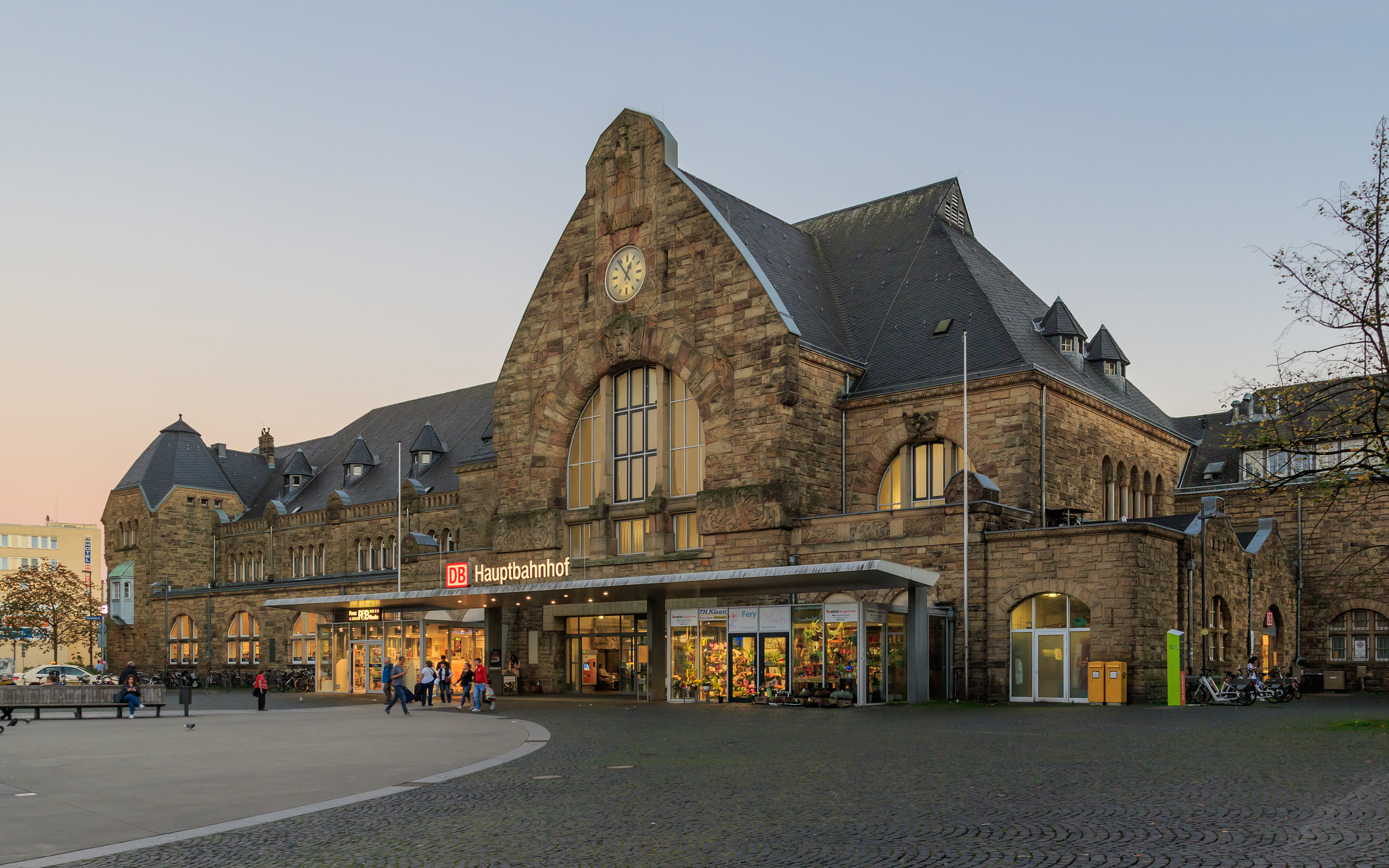
Aachen Hauptbahnhof

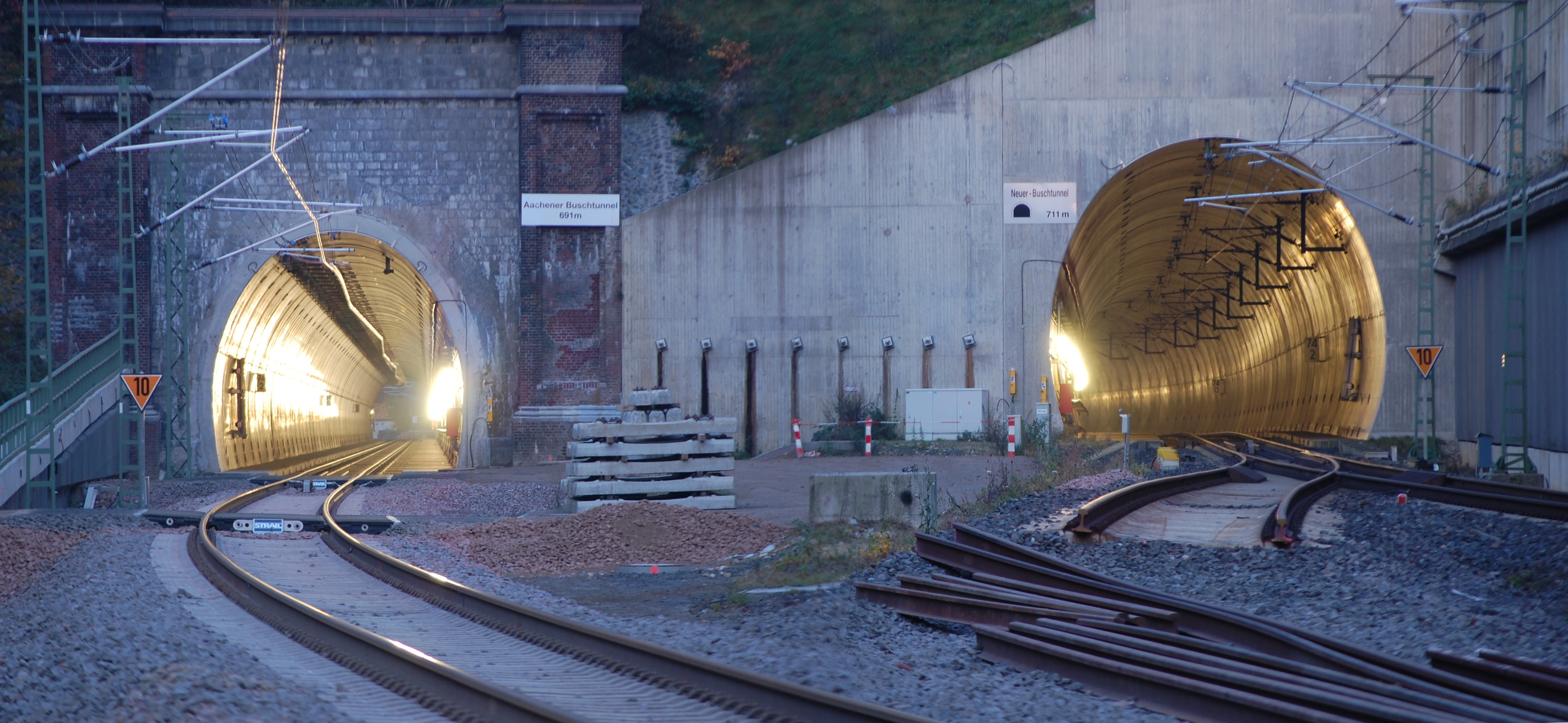
Buschtunnel

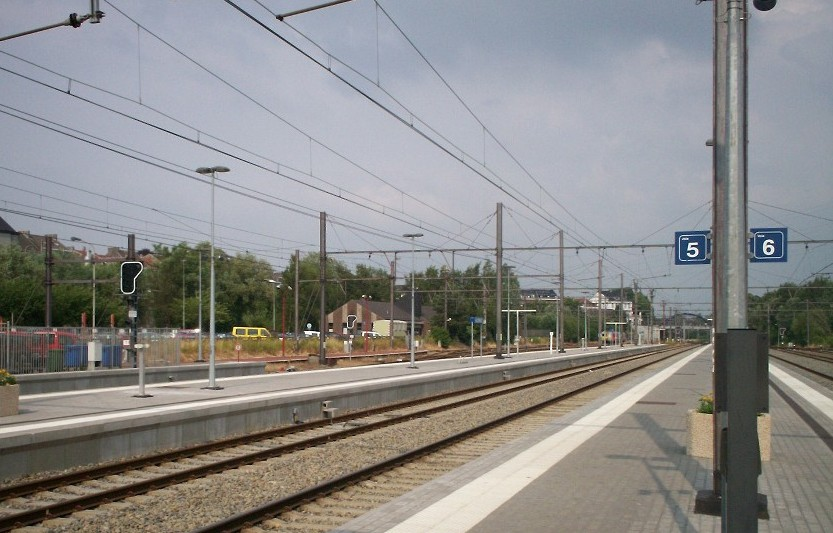
Welkenraedt

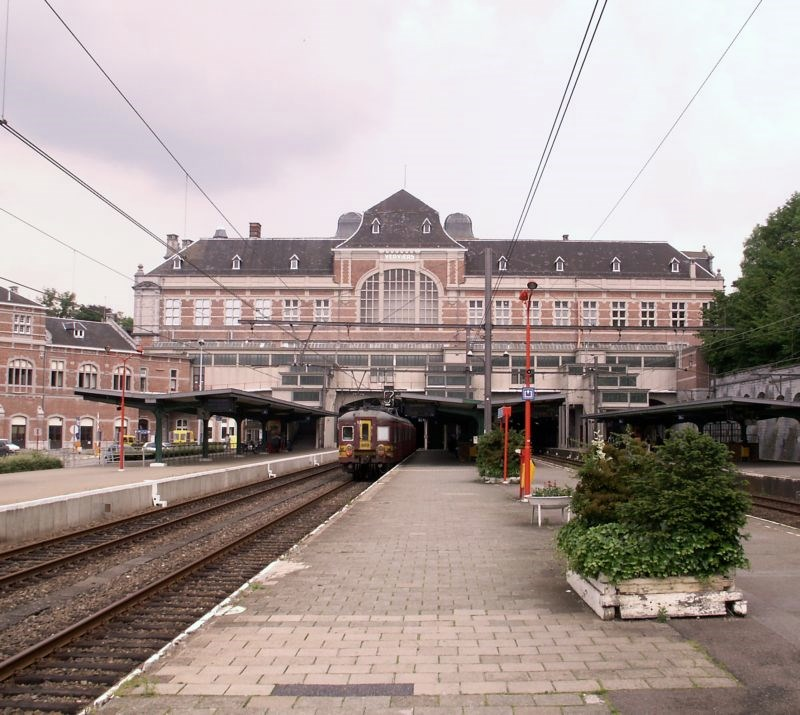
Verviers Central

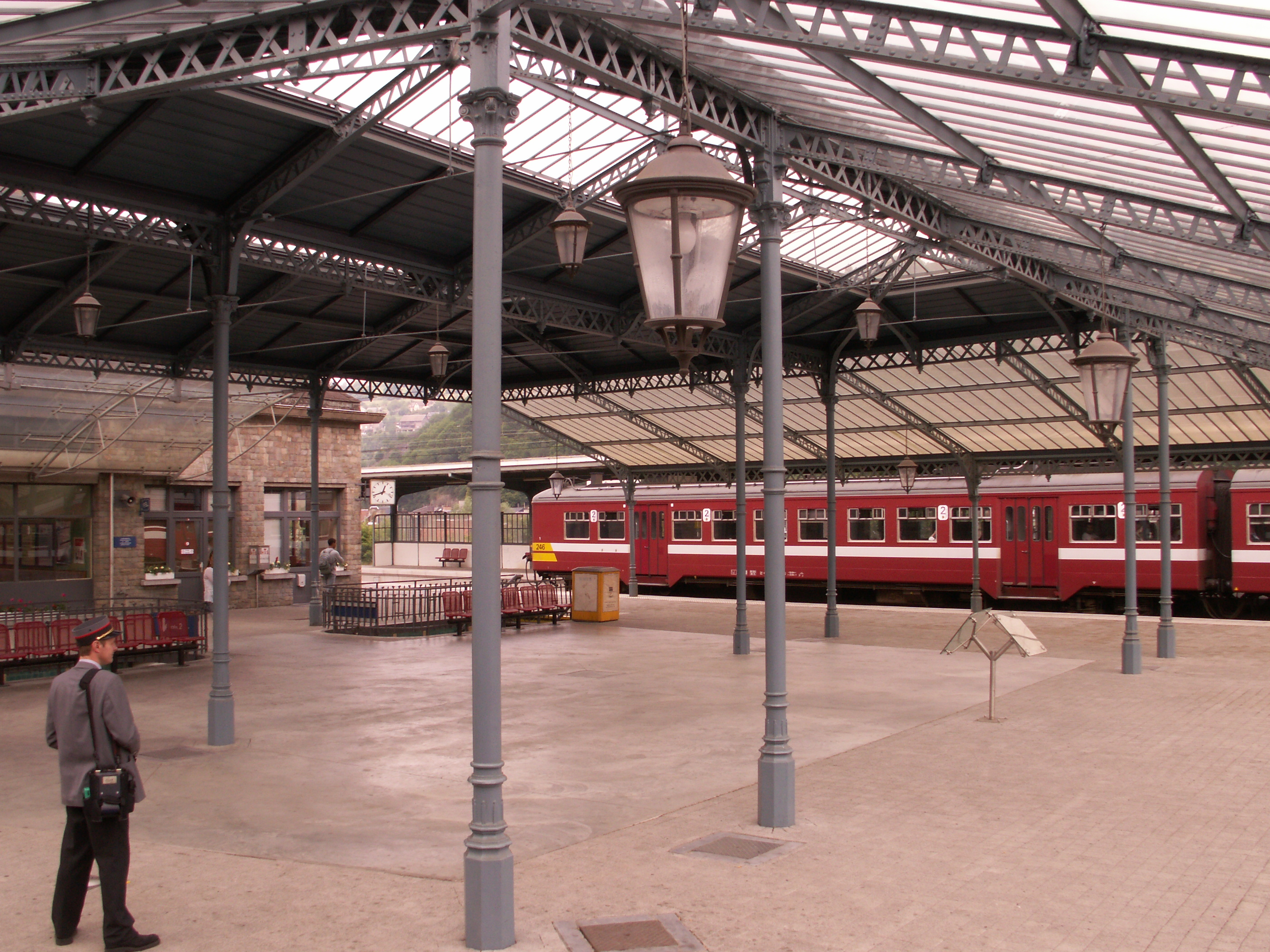
Pepinster

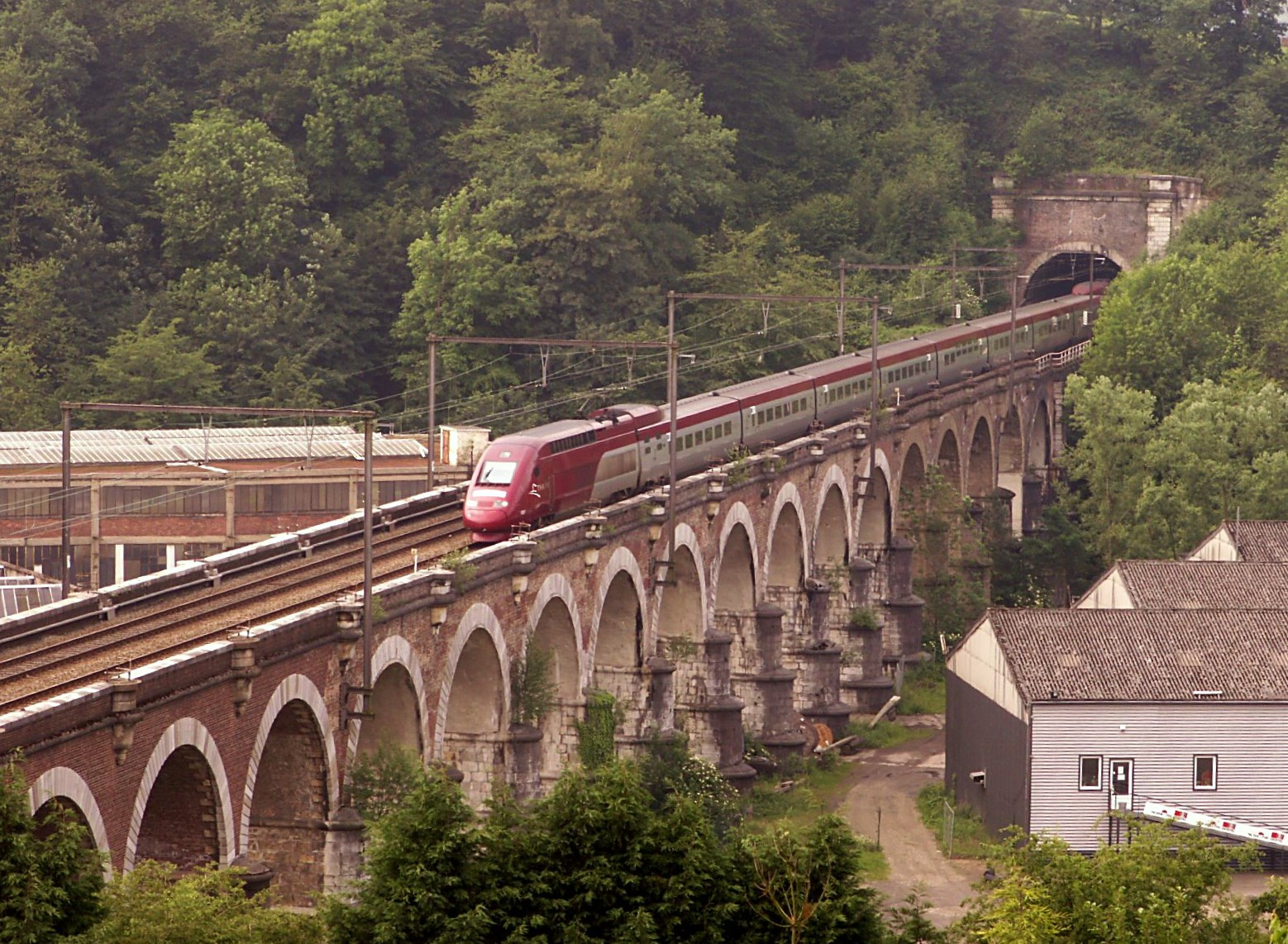
TGV on the Dolhain viaduct in 2007

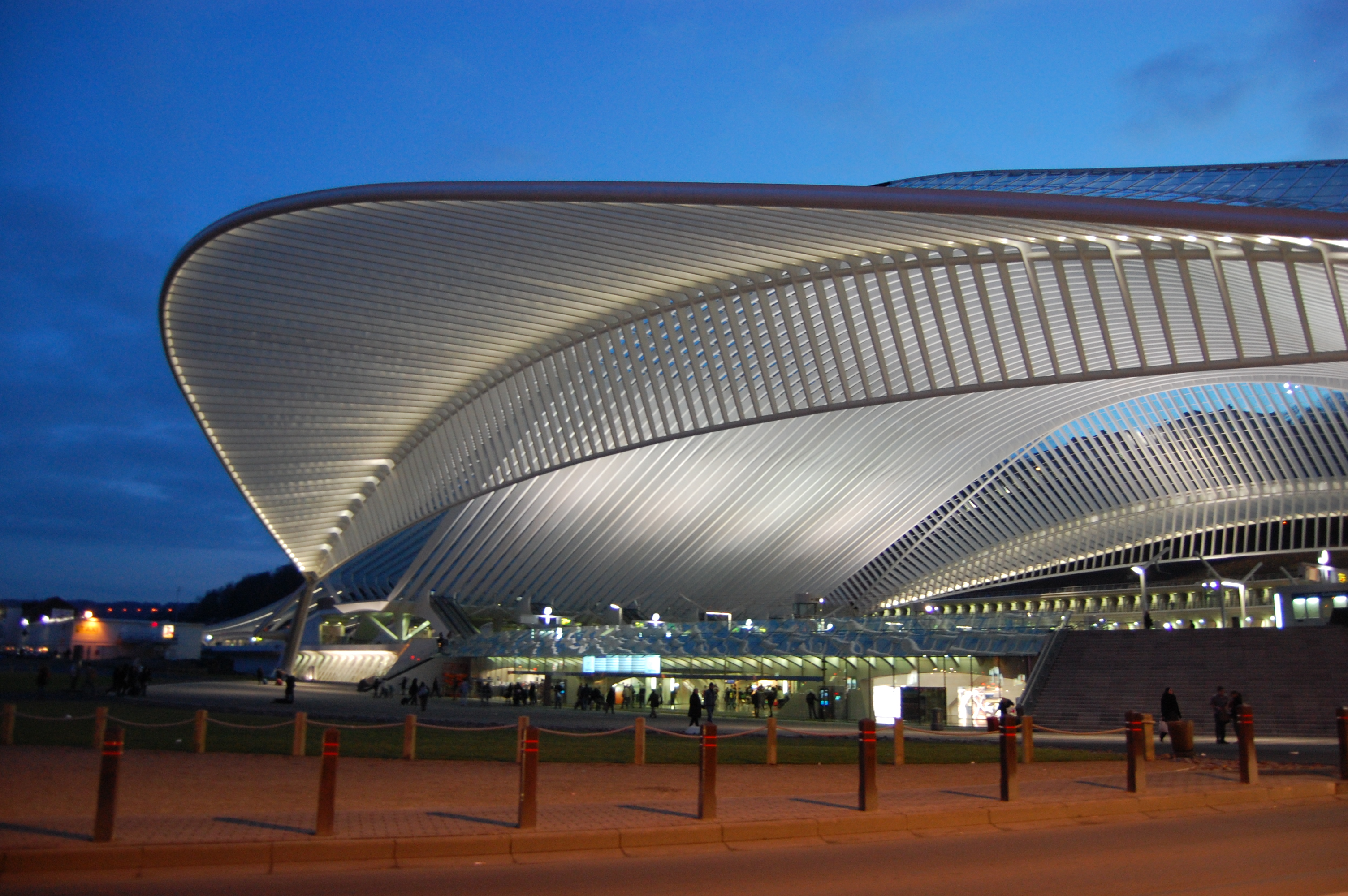
Liège-Guillemins
