= Belgian railway line 125 =

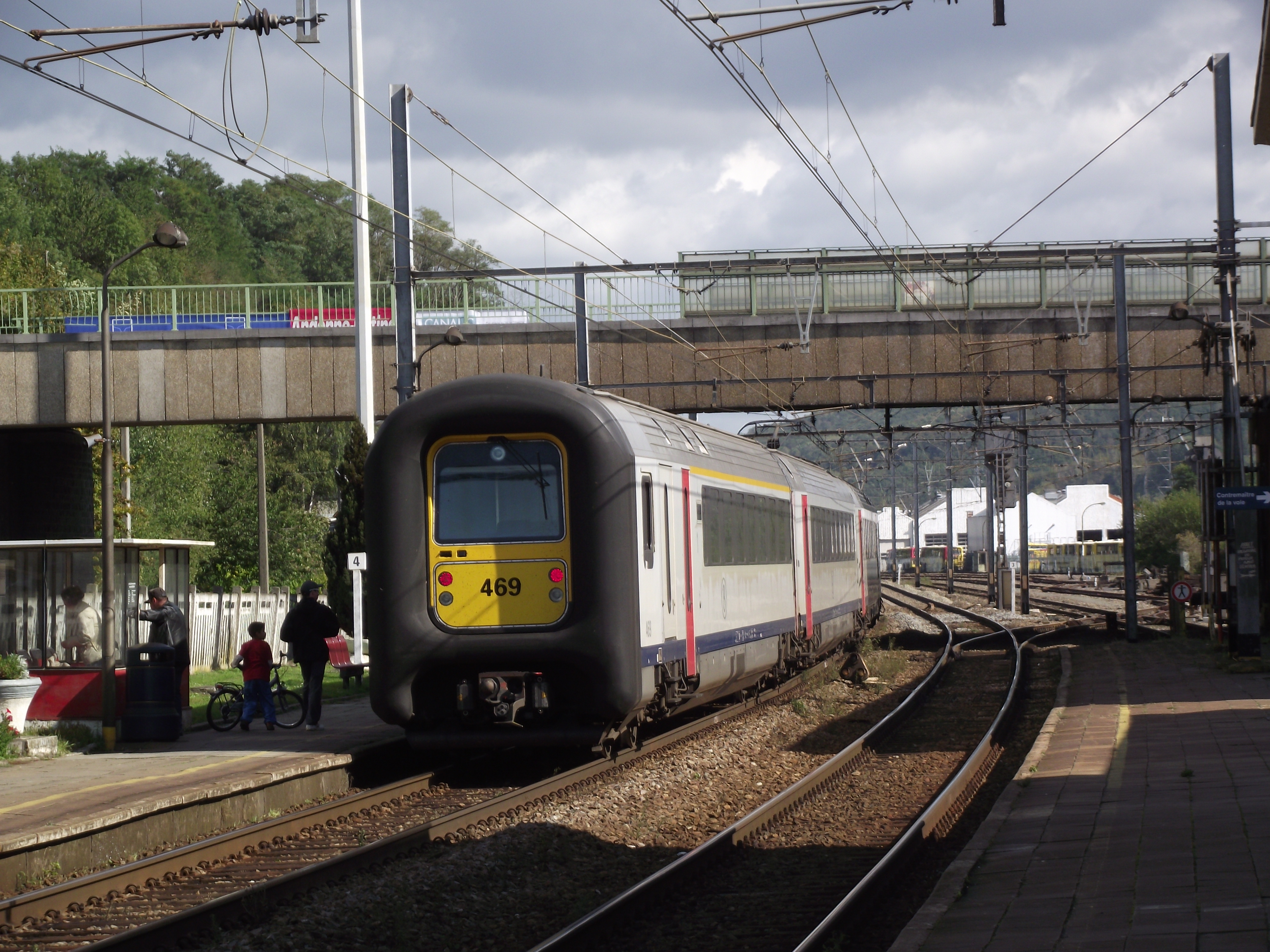
- A passenger train at Andenne station in 2010

Overview
- Status: Operational
- Locale: Belgium
- Termini: Liège-Guillemins railway station; Namur railway station

Service
Services
- Operator(s): National Railway Company of Belgium

History
- Opened: 1850-1851

Technical
- Line length: 60 km (37 mi)
- Number of tracks: double track
- Track gauge: 1,435 mm (4 ft 8 1/2 in) standard gauge
- Electrification: 3 kV DC
Route map
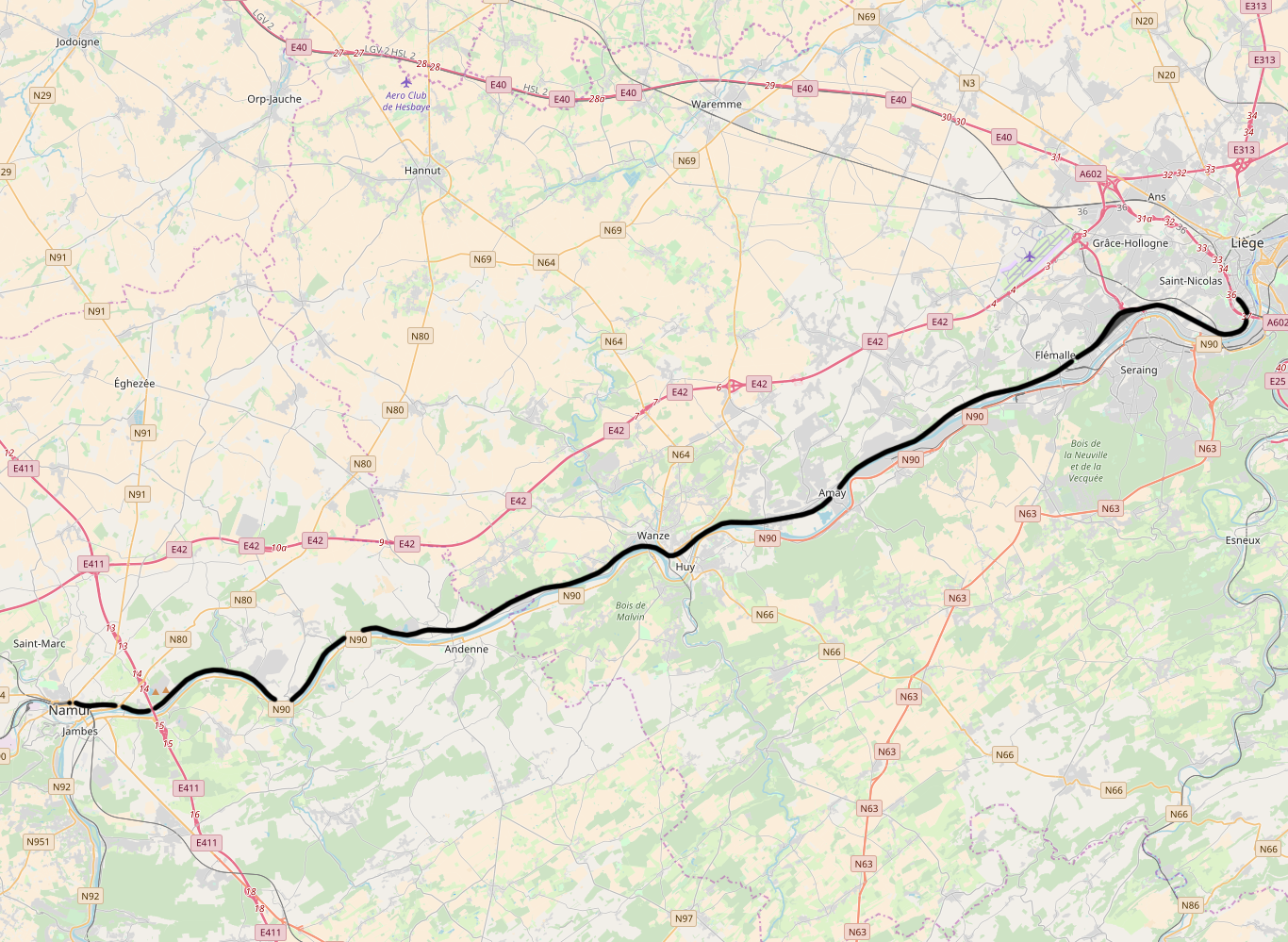

The Belgian railway line 125 is a railway line in Belgium connecting Liège and Namur. Completed in 1851, the line runs 59.5 km. It runs along the northern (left) bank of the river Meuse.

== Stations ==
The main interchange stations on line 125 are:

- Liège-Guillemins: to Brussels, Hasselt, Maastricht, Aachen, Marche-en-Famenne and Gouvy
- Namur: to Brussels, Luxembourg City, Dinant and Charleroi

== Accidents and incidents ==
- On 3 July 2008, a passenger train was in a rear-end collision with a freight train at Huy, near Saint-Georges-sur-Meuse. Forty-two people were injured.
- On 5 June 2016, a passenger train was in a rear-end collision with a freight train at Hermalle-sous-Huy. Three people were killed and 36 were wounded, nine seriously.
