= Kessel railway station =

Railway station in Antwerp, Belgium

Kessel
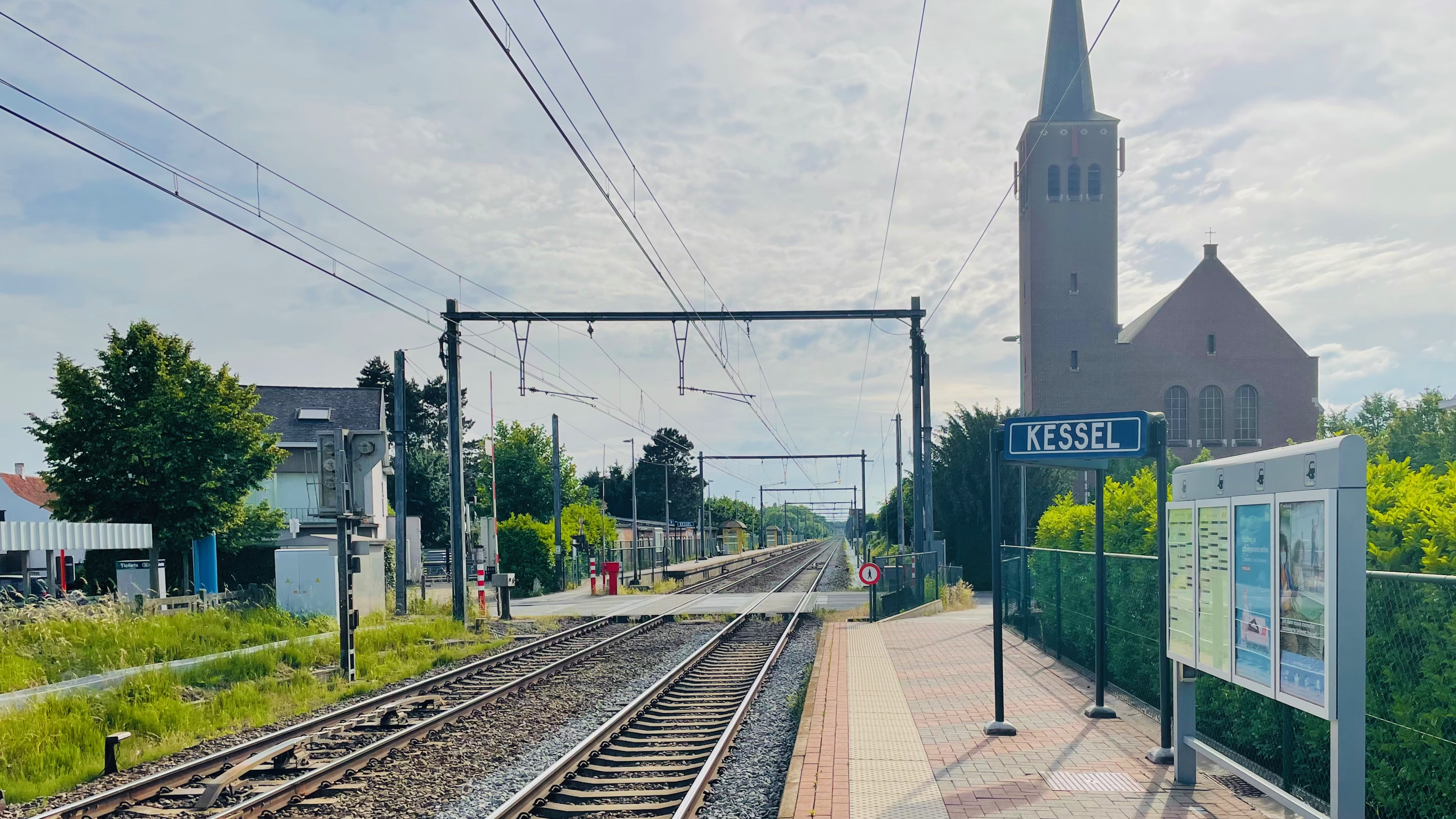
- Kessel railway station

General information
- Location: Nijlen, Kessel, Antwerp, Belgium
- Coordinates: 51°09′03″N 4°37′04″E
- System: Railway Station
- Owner: National Railway Company of Belgium
- Line: 15
- Platforms: 2
- Tracks: 2

History
- Opened: 1 March 1894
Location

Kessel Station is a railway station in Nijlen near Kessel, Belgium. It opened in 1894, serving the Lier–Turnhout railway line. The residential community which developed around the station was historically also called Kessel-Station. For a period, it was also an independent parish with its own church building at the station.

The railway station is served by Line 15.

== Train services ==
The following services currently the serve the station:

- Intercity services (IC-30) Antwerp - Herentals - Turnhout (weekends)
- Local services (L-24) Antwerp - Herentals - Mol (weekdays)

Preceding station	NMBS/SNCB	Following station
Lier towards Antwerpen-Centraal	IC 30 weekends	Nijlen towards Turnhout
Lier towards Antwerpen-Centraal	L 24 weekdays	Nijlen towards Mol

== Bus services ==
Bus service 3 serves the Toerenvenstraat, north of the station, service 154 calls at the station. They are operated by De Lijn.

- 3 (Lier - Kessel-Station - Emblem)
- 154 (Lier - Kessel-Station)

== Gallery ==
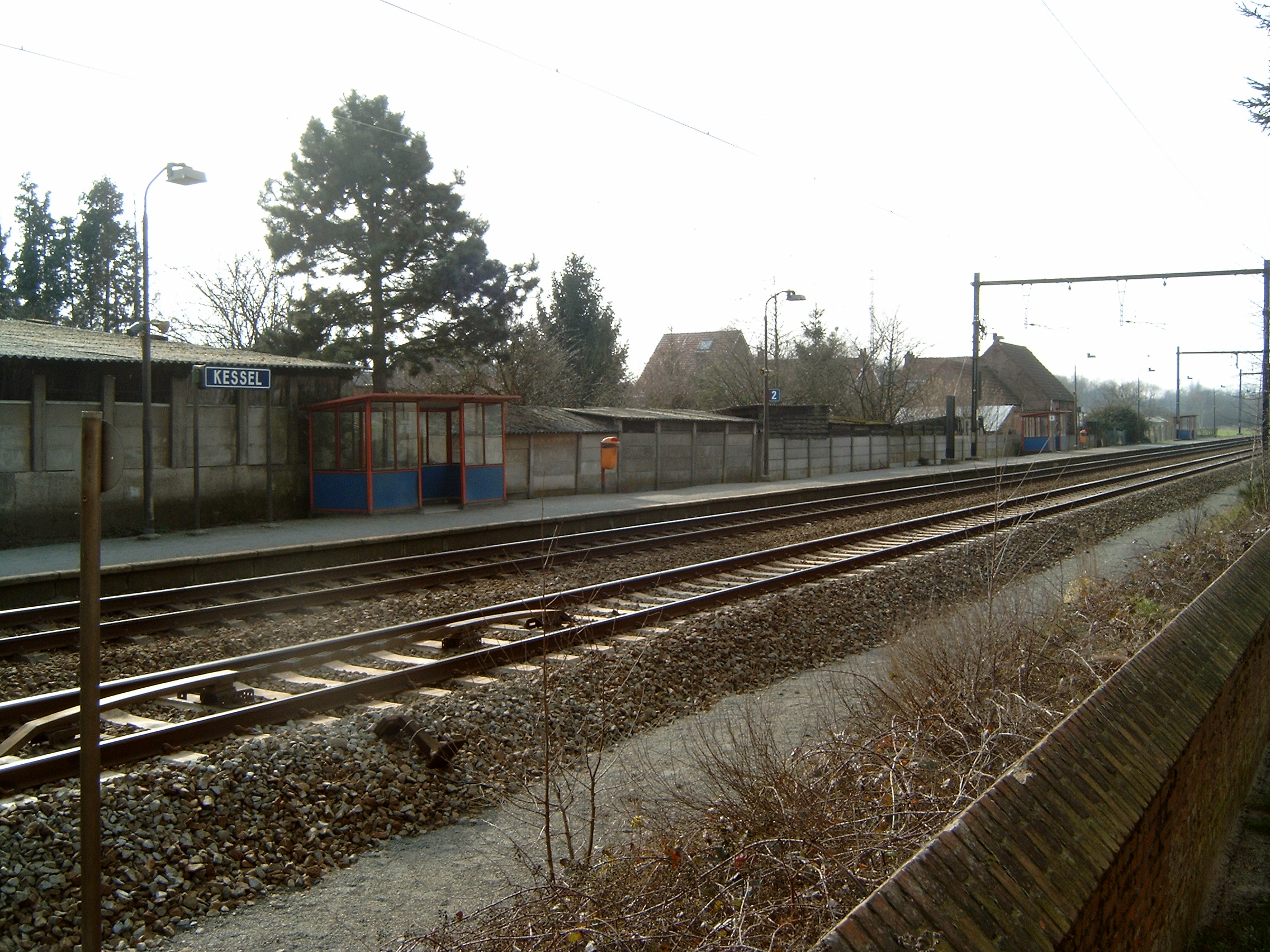
Kessel station in 2007
