= Bouwel railway station =

Railway station in Antwerp, Belgium

Bouwel
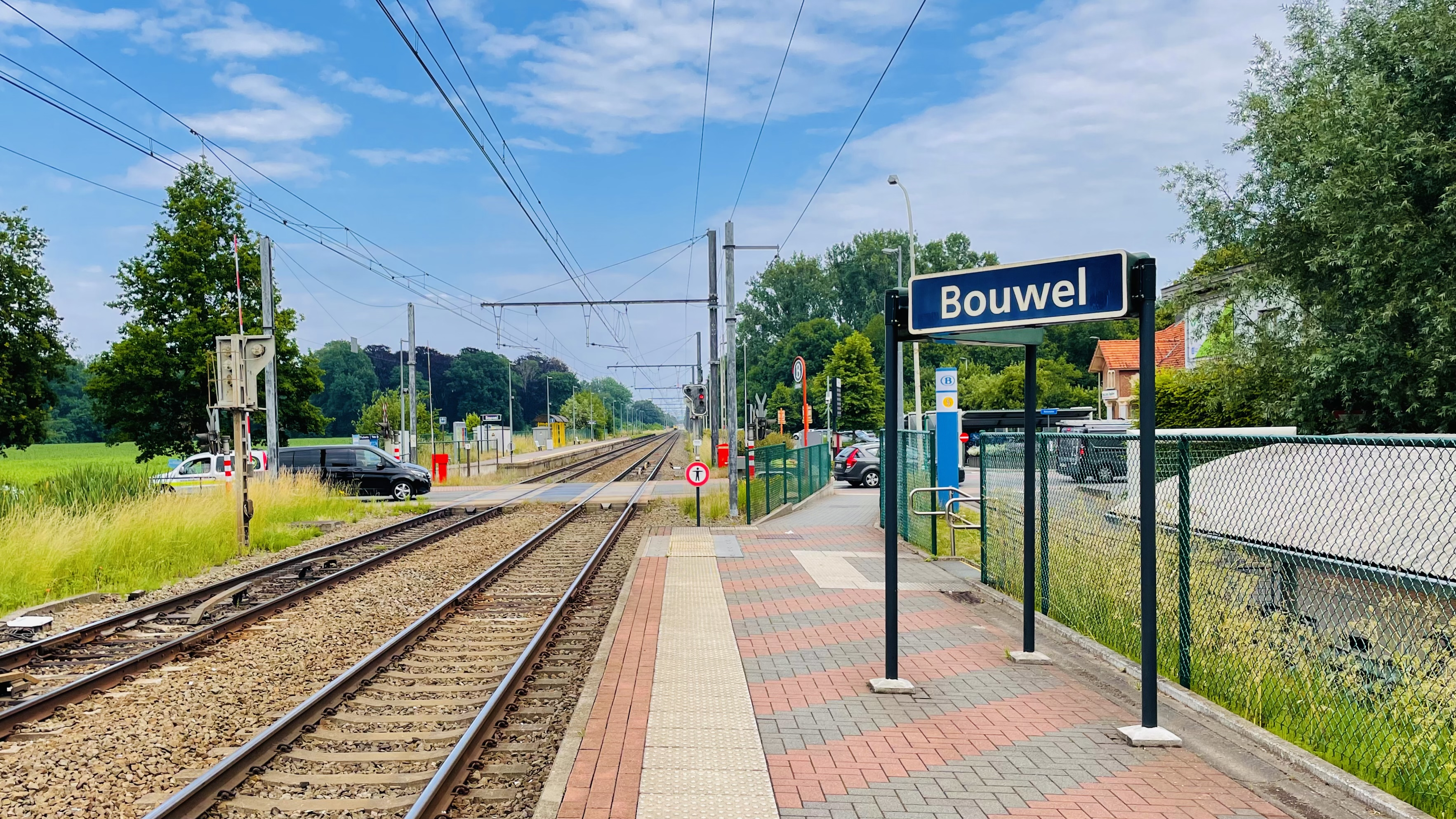
- Bouwel railway station

General information
- Location: Bouwel, Antwerp, Belgium
- Coordinates: 51°09′56″N 4°44′46″E
- System: Railway Station
- Owner: National Railway Company of Belgium
- Line: 15
- Platforms: 2
- Tracks: 2

History
- Opened: 23 April 1855

Services
Preceding station	NMBS/SNCB	Following station
Nijlen towards Antwerpen-Centraal	IC 30 weekends	Herentals towards Turnhout
Nijlen towards Antwerpen-Centraal	L 24 weekdays	Wolfstee towards Mol
Location

Bouwel is a railway station in Bouwel, Antwerp, Belgium. The station opened in 1855 on the Line 15.

== Train services ==
The following services currently serve the station:

- Intercity services (IC-30) Antwerp - Herentals - Turnhout (weekends)
- Local services (L-24) Antwerp - Herentals - Mol (weekdays)

== Bus services ==
The following bus services call at the station. They are operated by De Lijn.

- 513 (Heist-op-den-Berg - Herenthout - Bouwel - Vorselaar)
