= Herentals railway station =

Railway station in Antwerp, Belgium

Herentals
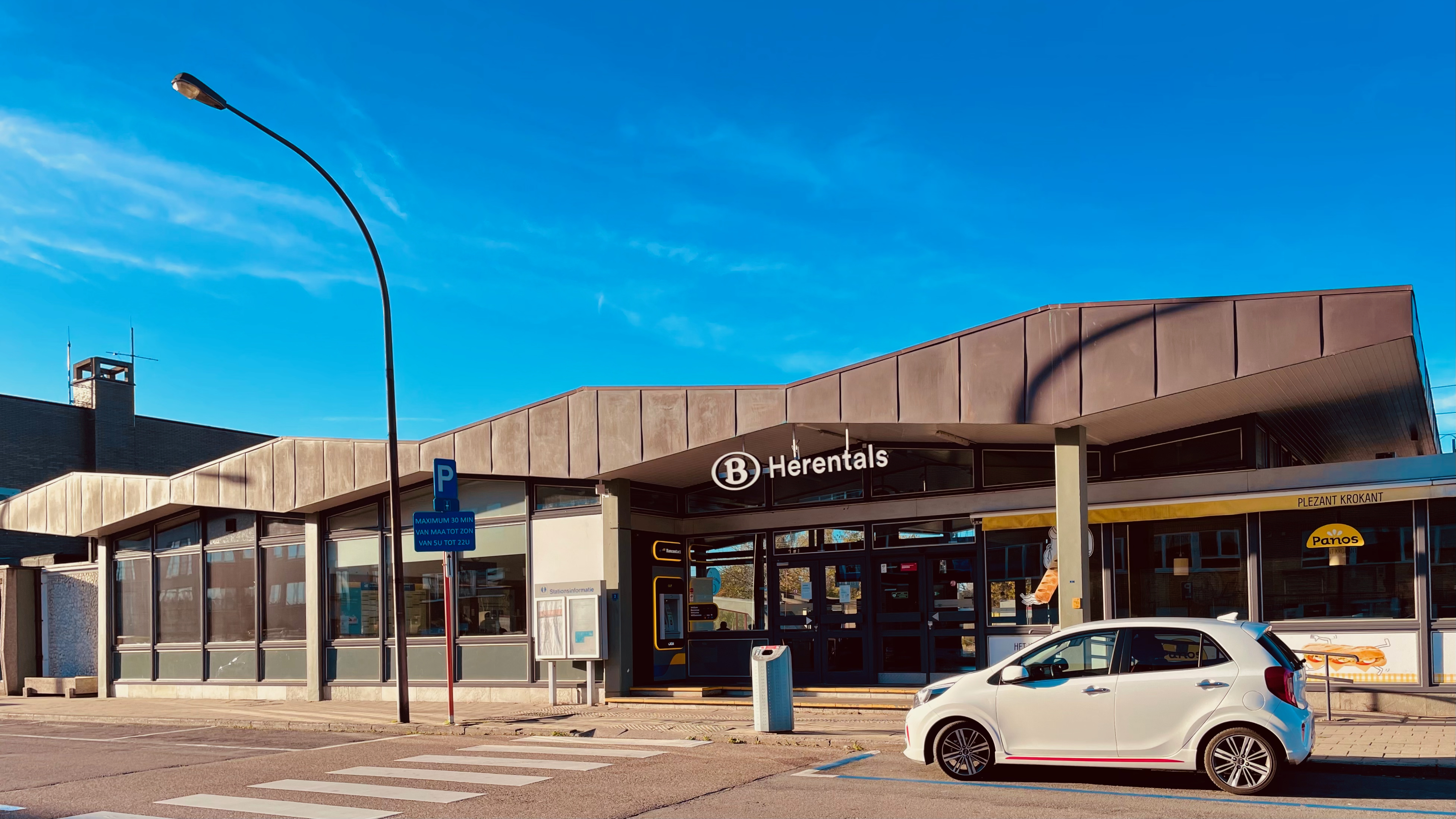
- Herentals railway station

General information
- Location: Herentals, Antwerp, Belgium
- Coordinates: 51°10′52″N 4°49′44″E
- System: Railway Station
- Owner: National Railway Company of Belgium
- Lines: 15, 29
- Platforms: 6

History
- Opened: 23 April 1855

Services
Preceding station	NMBS/SNCB	Following station
Lier towards Antwerpen-Centraal	IC 10	Olen towards Hamont or Hasselt
Lier towards Binche	IC 11 weekdays	Tielen towards Turnhout
Lier towards Antwerpen-Centraal	IC 30 weekdays, except holidays	Tielen towards Turnhout
Bouwel towards Antwerpen-Centraal	IC 30 weekends	Tielen towards Turnhout
Wolfstee towards Antwerpen-Centraal	L 24 weekdays	Olen towards Mol
Location

Herentals is a railway station in Herentals, Antwerp, Belgium. The station opened in 1855 as part of the line from Turnhout to Lier. It is located on Line 15 and Line 29.

== Train services ==
The station is served by the following services:

- Intercity services (IC-10) Antwerp - Mol - Hamont/Hasselt
- Intercity services (IC-11) Binche - Braine-le-Comte - Halle - Brussels - Mechelen - Turnhout (weekdays)
- Intercity services (IC-30) Antwerp - Herentals - Turnhout
- Local services (L-24) Antwerp - Herentals - Mol (weekdays)

== Bus services ==
The following bus services call at the station. They are operated by De Lijn.

- 15b (Herentals – Olen – Geel)
- 150 (Lier – Kessel – Nijlen – Bouwel – Herentals)
- 159 (Herentals – Herentals Industrie Wolfstee)
- 210 (Turnhout – Lille – Herentals)
- 212 (Turnhout – Gierle – Lichtaart – Herentals)
- 220 (Herentals – Hulshout – Westmeerbeek – Aarschot)
- 221 (Herentals – Heultje – Westmeerbeek – Houtvenne – Aarschot)
- 305 (Turnhout – Herentals – Herselt – Aarschot – Leuven)
- 418 (Antwerpen – Lille – Herentals) Express
- 420 (Antwerpen – Broechem – Massenhoven – Herentals)
- 427 (Antwerpen – Massenhoven – Herentals) Express
- 429 (Antwerpen – Zoersel – Malle – Lille – Herentals) Express
- 511 (Mechelen – Heist-op-den-Berg – Herenthout – Herentals)
- 540 (Westerlo – Oevel – Olen – Herentals)
- 541 (Westerlo – Voortkapel – Olen – Herentals)
- 542 (Herentals – Olen – Geel Industrie)
