= Lier railway station =

Railway station in Antwerp, Belgium

Lier
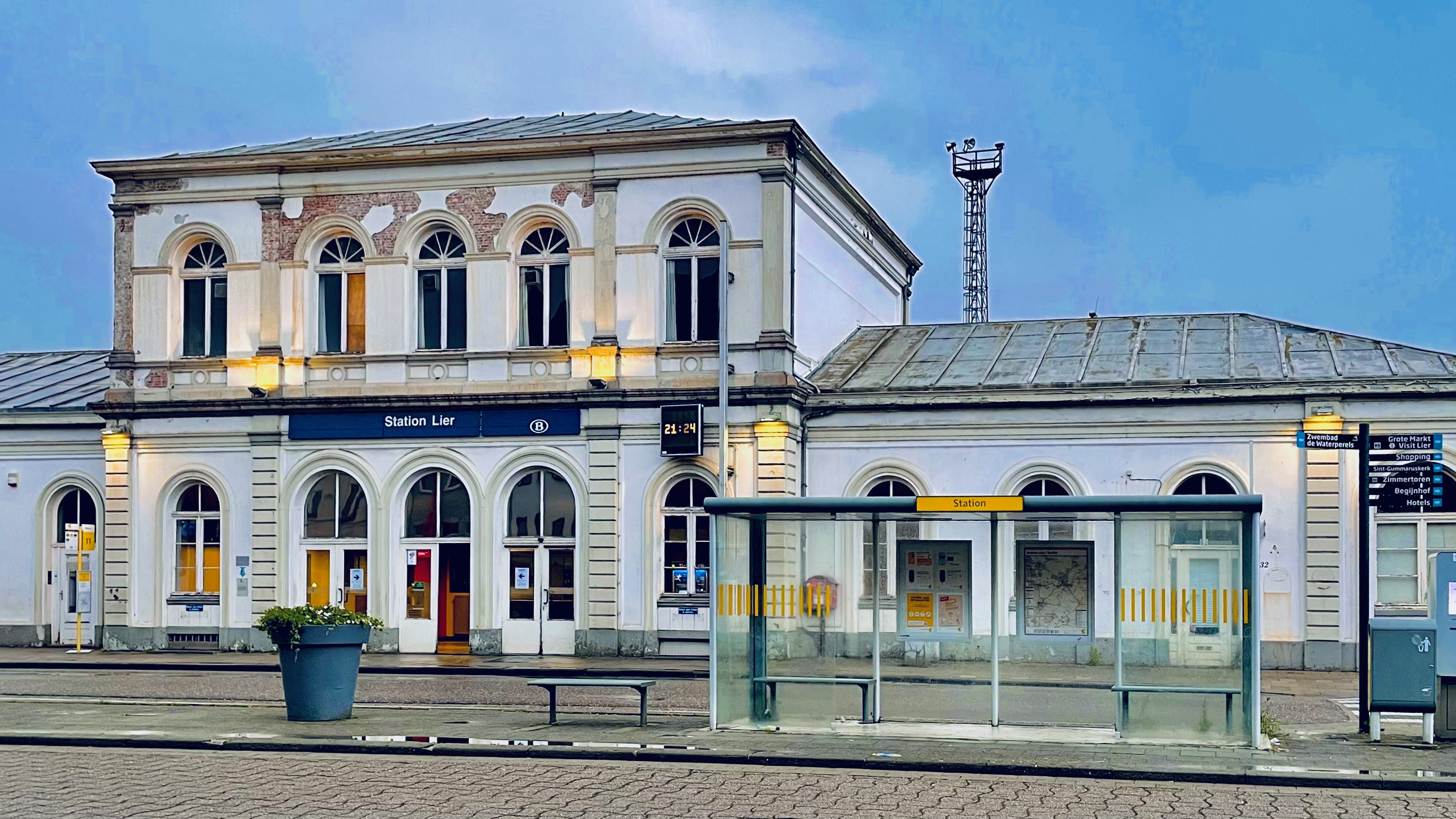
- Lier railway station

General information
- Location: Lier, Antwerp; Belgium
- Coordinates: 51°08′10″N 4°33′33″E
- System: Railway Station
- Owner: NMBS/SNCB
- Operator: NMBS/SNCB
- Lines: 13, 15, 205
- Platforms: 5
- Tracks: 9

History
- Opened: 23 April 1855; 171 years ago
Location

Lier railway station (Dutch: Station Lier; French: Gare de Lierre) (Note: Officially Lier (Dutch: Lier; French: Lierre)) is a railway station in Lier, Antwerp, Belgium. The station opened on 23 April 1855 on railway lines 13 and 15. Until 1988, the station was also on line 205, when this line closed. The train services are operated by the National Railway Company of Belgium (NMBS/SNCB).

== Train services ==
The station is served by the following services:

- Intercity services (IC-09) Antwerp - Lier - Aarschot - Leuven (weekdays)
- Intercity services (IC-10) Antwerp - Mol - Hamont/Hasselt
- Intercity services (IC-11) Binche - Braine-le-Comte - Halle - Brussels - Mechelen - Turnhout (weekdays)
- Intercity services (IC-30) Antwerp - Herentals - Turnhout
- Local services (L-23) Antwerp - Lier - Aarschot - Leuven
- Local services (L-24) Antwerp - Herentals - Mol (weekdays)

Preceding station	NMBS/SNCB	Following station
Antwerpen-Berchem towards Antwerpen-Centraal	IC 09 weekdays, except holidays	Heist-op-den-Berg towards Leuven
Antwerpen-Berchem towards Antwerpen-Centraal	IC 09 weekends	Heist-op-den-Berg towards Liège-Guillemins
Antwerpen-Berchem towards Antwerpen-Centraal	IC 10	Herentals towards Hamont or Hasselt
Mechelen towards Binche	IC 11 weekdays	Herentals towards Turnhout
Antwerpen-Berchem towards Antwerpen-Centraal	IC 30 weekdays, except holidays	Herentals towards Turnhout
Antwerpen-Berchem towards Antwerpen-Centraal	IC 30 weekends	Kessel towards Turnhout
Boechout towards Antwerpen-Centraal	L 23	Berlaar towards Leuven
Boechout towards Antwerpen-Centraal	L 24 weekdays	Kessel towards Mol

== Bus services ==
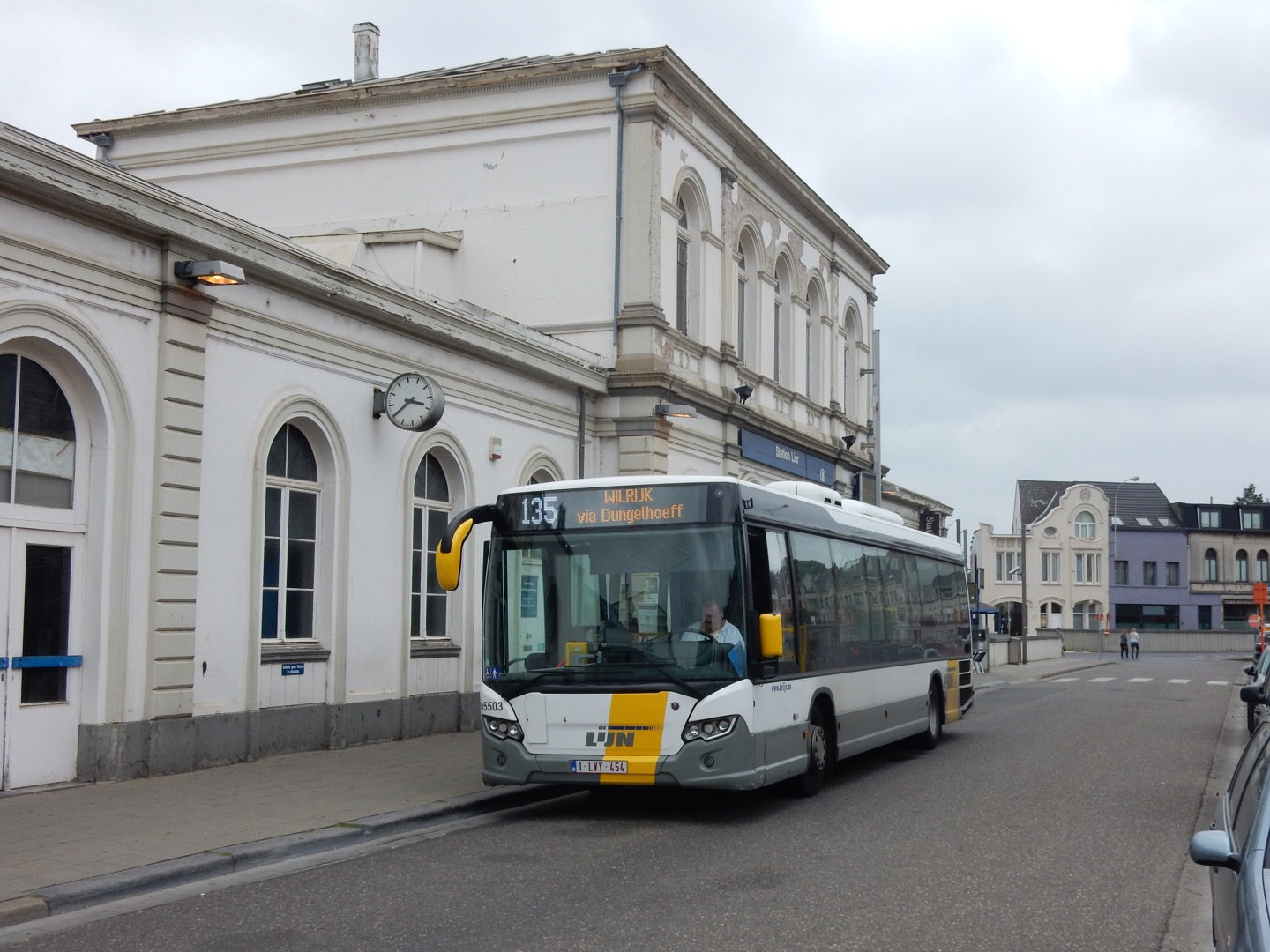
Bus 135 at Lier station

These bus services depart from the bus station outside the station. They are operated by De Lijn.

- 2 (Station - Duffel)
- 3 (Station - Kessel - Emblem)
- 35 (Lier - Hove- Lint - Kontich - UZA)
- 150 (Lier - Nijlen - Herentals)
- 151 (Lier - Nijlen - Herenthout)
- 152 (Lier - Nijlen - Grobbendonk - Vorselaar)
- 153 (Lier - Nijlen Sint-Paulus)
- 154 (Lier - Kessel)
- 351 (Lier - Hove - Lint - Kontich - Boom)
- 359 (Lier - Hove - Lint - Kontich - Wilrijk)
- 422 (Antwerpen - Broechem - Lier)
- 423 (Antwerpen - Broechem - Emblem - Lier via Draaiboom)
- 425 (Oelegem - Broechem - Lier)
- 426 (Oelegem - Ranst - Broechem - Lier)
- 428 (Varselaar - Broechem - Lier)
- 550 (Mechelen Gandhistraat - Elzestraat - Duffel - Lier)
- 555 (Lier - Duffel - Rumst)
- 556 (Lier - Duffel - Waarloos)
- 560 (Mechelen - Sint-Katelinjne-Waver - Lier via Beukheuvel)
- 561 (Mechelen - Sint-Katelinjne-Waver - Lier via Berlaarbaan)
- 570 (Lier - Berlaar Heikant - Berlaar)
- 571 (Lier - Berlaar Heikant - Putte - Lier)

== See also ==
- List of railway stations in Belgium
- Rail transport in Belgium
