= Nijlen railway station =

Railway station in Antwerp, Belgium

Nijlen
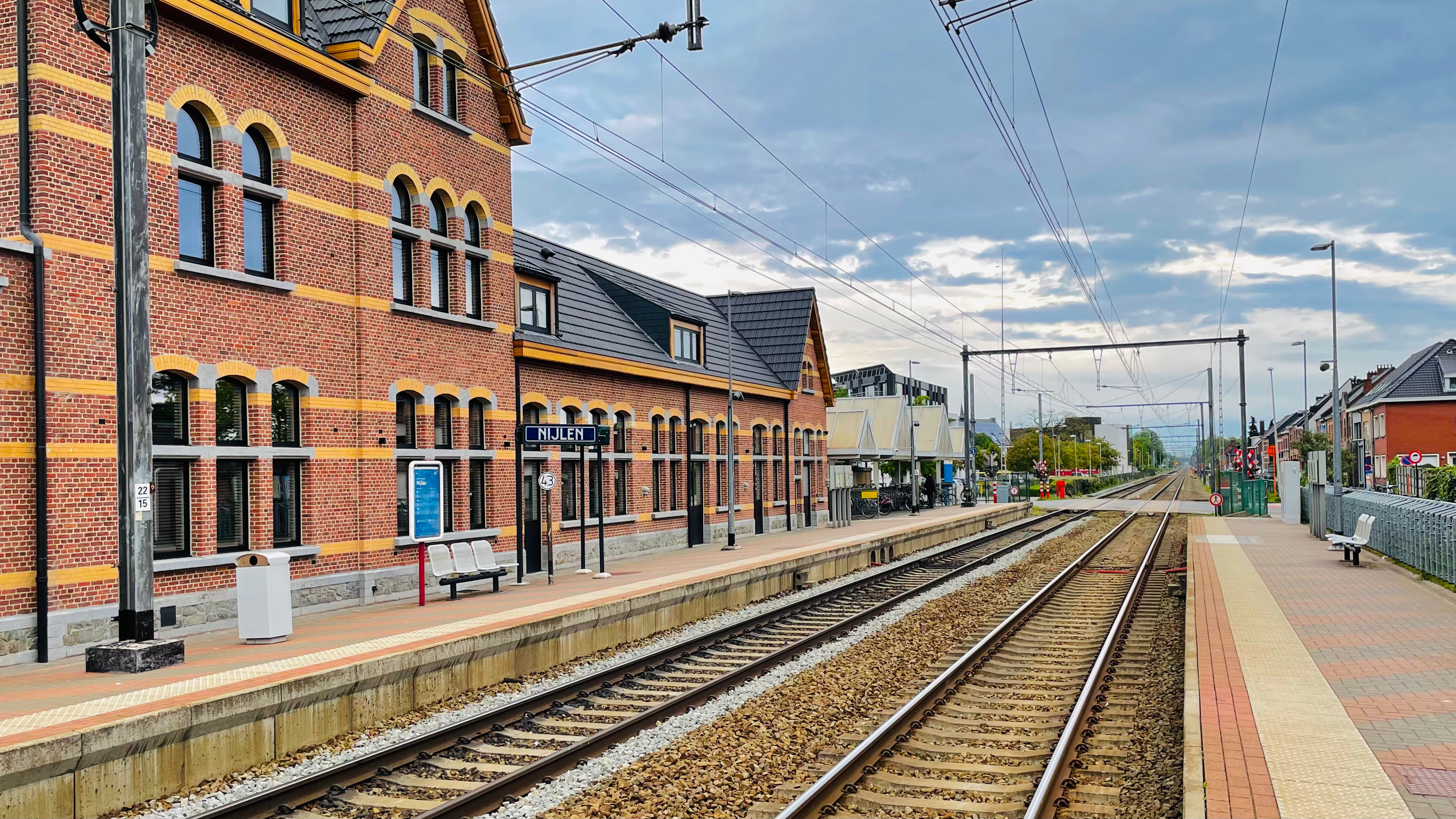
- Nijlen railway station

General information
- Location: Nijlen, Antwerp; Belgium
- Coordinates: 51°09′34″N 4°39′56″E
- System: Railway Station
- Owner: National Railway Company of Belgium
- Line: 15
- Platforms: 2
- Tracks: 2

Other information
- Station code: FJE

History
- Opened: 23 April 1855

Services
Preceding station	NMBS/SNCB	Following station
Kessel towards Antwerpen-Centraal	IC 30 weekends	Bouwel towards Turnhout
Kessel towards Antwerpen-Centraal	L 24 weekdays	Bouwel towards Mol
Location

Nijlen is a railway station in Nijlen, Antwerp, Belgium. The station opened in 1855 on the Line 15.

== Train services ==
The following services currently the serve the station:

- Intercity services (IC-30) Antwerp - Herentals - Turnhout (weekends)
- Local services (L-24) Antwerp - Herentals - Mol (weekdays)

== Bus services ==
The following bus services call at the station. They are operated by De Lijn.

- 150 (Lier - Kessel - Nijlen - Bouwel - Herentals)
- 151 (Lier - Kessel - Nijlen - Bevel - Herenthout)
- 152 (Lier - Kessel - Nijlen - Bouwel - Grobbendonk)
- 153 (Lier - Kessel - Nijlen, Sint Paulus)
