= Wolfstee railway station =

Railway station in Antwerp, Belgium

Wolfstee
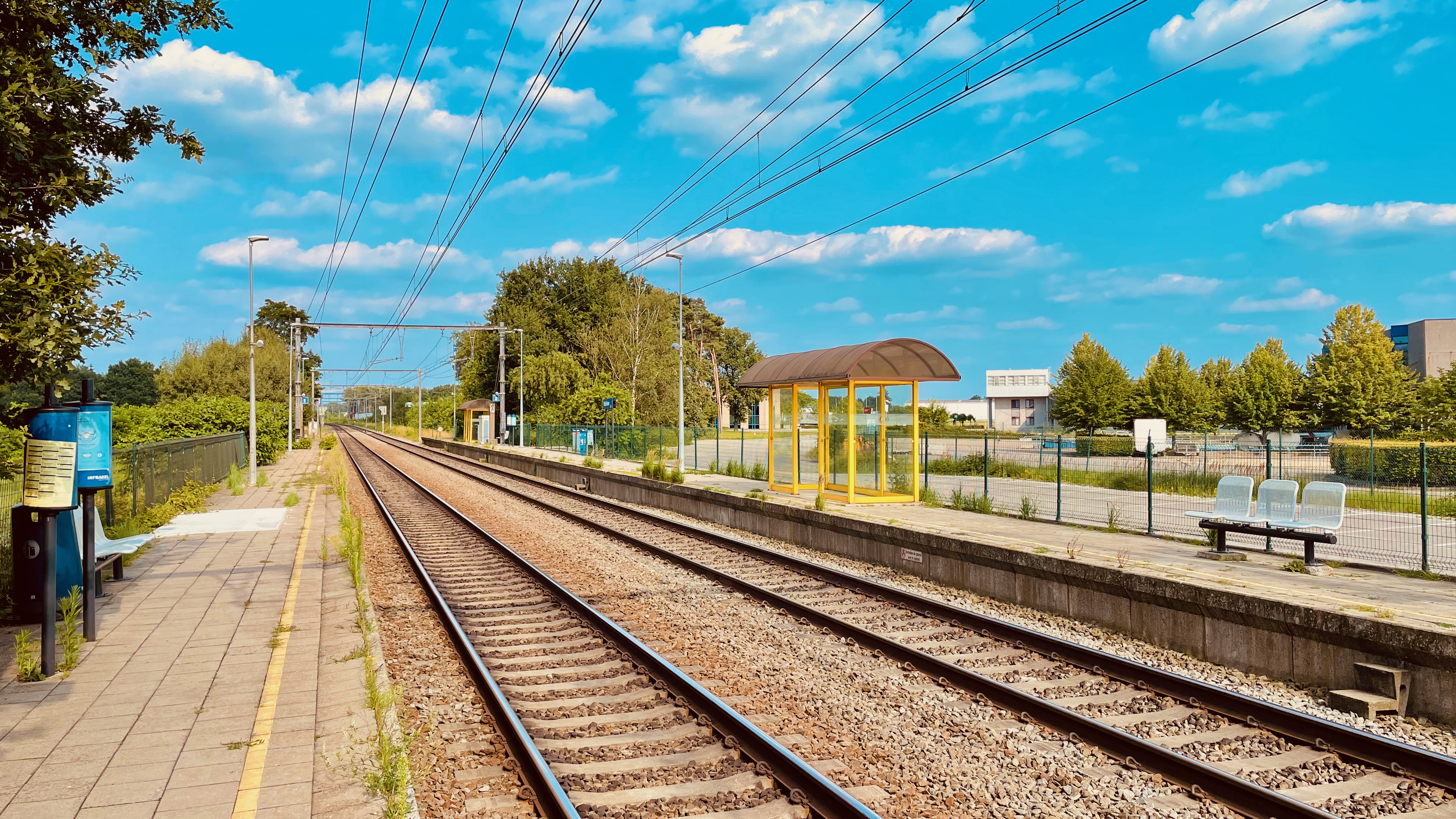
- Wolfstee railway station

General information
- Location: Herentals, Antwerp, Belgium
- Coordinates: 51°10′06″N 4°47′05″E
- System: Railway Station
- Owner: National Railway Company of Belgium
- Line: 15
- Platforms: 2
- Tracks: 2

History
- Opened: 2004

Services
Preceding station	NMBS/SNCB	Following station
Bouwel towards Antwerpen-Centraal	S 33 weekdays	Herentals towards Mol
Location

Wolfstee is a railway station in Herentals, Antwerp, Belgium. The station opened in 2004 on the Line 15. The station was built to reduce the amount of car traffic heading to Antwerp while there was work completed on the Antwerp-Ring. The station bridge over the tracks was moved from Antwerpen-Berchem railway station to Wolfstee station.

== Train services ==
The following services currently the serve the station:

- S-train services (S33) Antwerp - Lier - Herentals - Mol (weekdays)

The station is closed at the weekend.

== Bus services ==
The following bus services call at the station. They are operated by De Lijn.

- 159 (Herentals Industrie – Herentals)
