= Boechout railway station =

Railway station in Antwerp, Belgium

Boechout
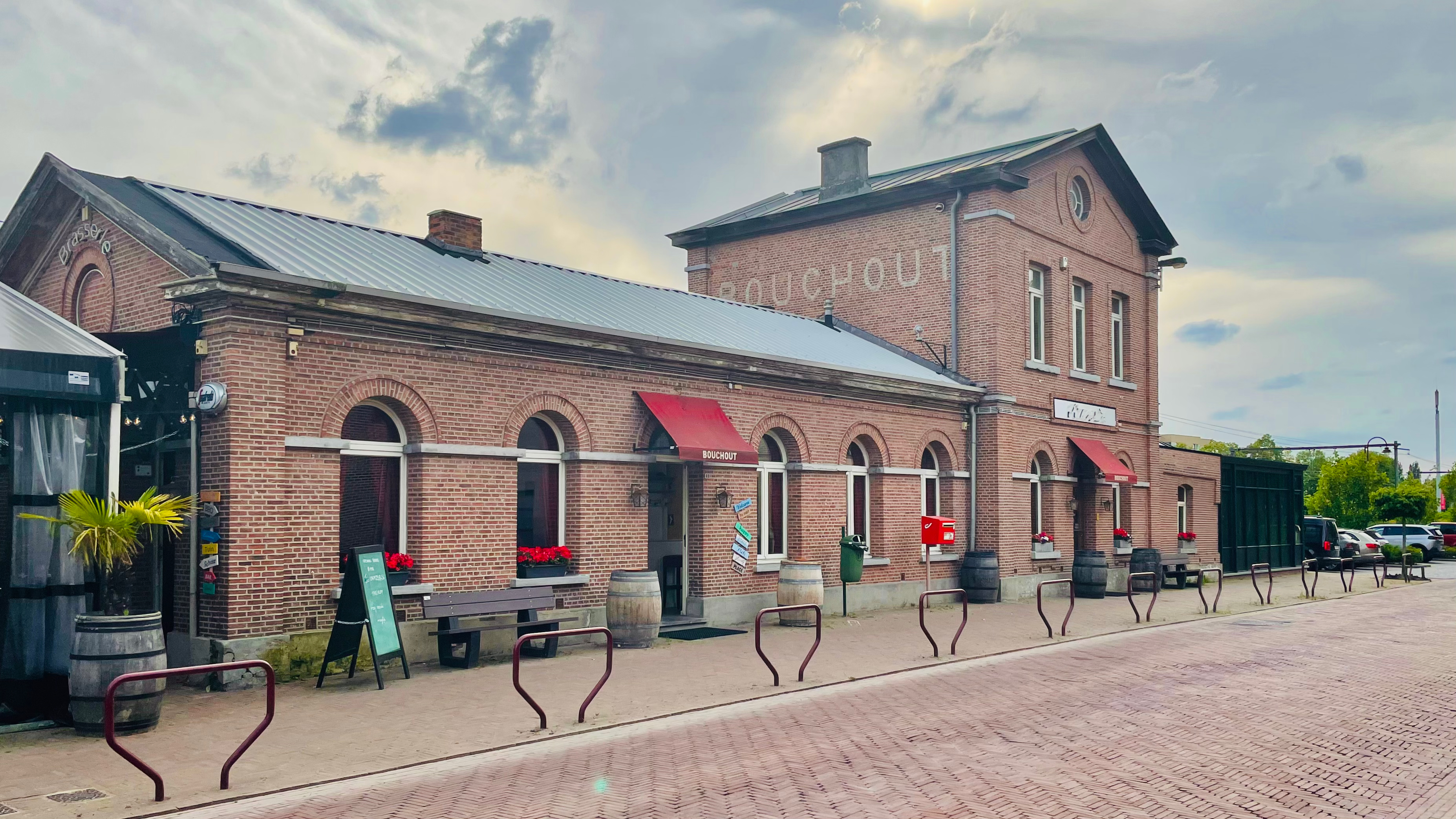
- Boechout railway station

General information
- Location: Frans Segersstraat 3, Boechout, Antwerp, Belgium
- Coordinates: 51°09′47″N 4°29′43″E
- System: Railway Station
- Owner: National Railway Company of Belgium
- Line: 15
- Platforms: 2
- Tracks: 2

History
- Opened: 10 June 1864

Services
Preceding station	NMBS/SNCB	Following station
Mortsel towards Antwerpen-Centraal	L 23	Lier towards Leuven
Mortsel towards Antwerpen-Centraal	L 24 weekdays	Lier towards Mol
Location

Boechout is a railway station in Boechout, Antwerp, Belgium. The station opened in 1864 on the Line 15.

== Train services ==
The following services currently the serve the station:

- Local services (L-23) Antwerp - Aarschot - Leuven
- Local services (L-24) Antwerp - Herentals - Mol (weekdays)

== Bus services ==
These bus services depart from the Gemeentehuis, 100m east of the station. They are operated by De Lijn.

- 51 (Vremde - Boechout - Hove - Mortsel - Mortsel Station - Antwerp Airport - Berchem)
- 90 (Berchem - Mortsel - Boechout - Lier Veemarkt)
- 243 - Broechem - Boechout - Hove - Kontich scholen
