= Libera Carlier =

Seaman

Libera Carlier (19 January 1926 in Nijlen – 25 April 2007 in Ekeren) was a Belgian seaman and writer. He attended the Hogere Zeevaartschool (E: higher seagoing school) and was a member of the resistance during World War II. When sixteen years old he ran away from home during the war and tried to reach the United Kingdom, but only got to France and was sent back. He was married to Joanna Pairoux and has 3 sons: Guy, Robert and Mark.

Being a captain and river pilot, his tales and novels are mainly related to the sea and the sailors. He made his debut with De zondagsslepers (E: The Sunday haulers) in 1957. Well-known works by him are Tussen wal en schip (E: between rampart and ship) (1977), about the inland shipping, and Langs de kade (E: along the quay) (1987) with the port police force in the head role. Both were made into TV series. Libera has written the screen play for several series including Geschiedenis mijner jeugd (E: Memories of my Youth) based on the work of Hendrik Conscience.

He was nominated for an Emmy Award for the script of de blijde dag by Stijn Streuvels.

His work has been translated into both French and Russian.

== Works ==
- De zondagsslepers (1957)
- Duel met de tanker (1957)
- Action Station Go (1958)
- Piraten (1960)
- Het kanaal (1961)
- De vlucht (1962)
- Teder als trotyl (1963)
- De kleine reder (1965) (verhaal uit "Dietsche Warande en Belfort") (In "Vlaamse verhalen van deze tijd")
- Het oosten is rood (1967)
- De luipaard, en andere verhalen (1968)
- Het geheim van Altamare (1969)
- De kikvorsman (1969)
- De grote wedstrijd (1969)
- Varen in ballast (1970)
- Even be-westen Quessant (1974)
- Tussen wal en schip (1977)
- Het koperen schip (1980)
- Geschiedenis mijner jeugd : faction naar Hendrik Conscience (1983)
- Het yacht Bernard (1984)
- Langs de kade (1987)

== Awards ==
- 1959 - Arkprijs van het Vrije Woord

== See also ==
- Flemish literature

== Sources ==
- Libera Carlier
- Libera Carlier
