= Tielen railway station =

Railway station in Antwerp, Belgium

Tielen
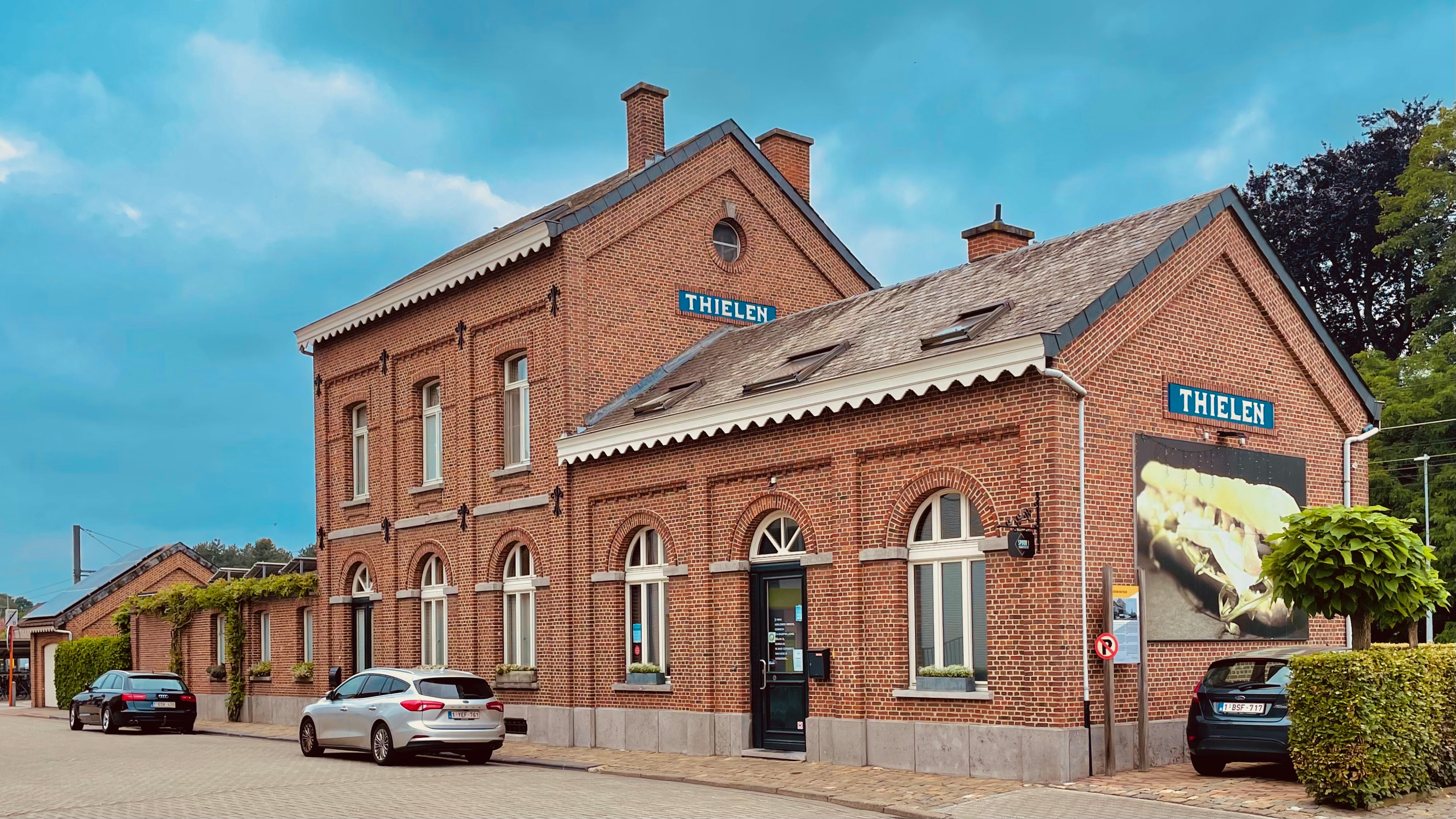
- Tielen railway station

General information
- Location: Tielen, Antwerp, Belgium
- Coordinates: 51°14′28″N 4°53′37″E
- System: Railway Station
- Owner: National Railway Company of Belgium
- Line: 29
- Platforms: 2
- Tracks: 2

History
- Opened: 23 May 1855

Services
Preceding station	NMBS/SNCB	Following station
Herentals towards Binche	IC 11 weekdays	Turnhout Terminus
Herentals towards Antwerpen-Centraal	IC 30	Turnhout Terminus
Location

Tielen is a railway station in Tielen, Antwerp, Belgium. The station opened in 1855 and is located on Line 29.

== Train services ==
The station is served by the following services:

- Intercity services (IC-11) Binche - Braine-le-Comte - Halle - Brussels - Mechelen - Turnhout (weekdays)
- Intercity services (IC-30) Antwerp - Herentals - Turnhout

== Bus services ==
The following bus services stop near the station. They are operated by De Lijn.

- 200 (Turnhout – Vosselaar – Tielen – Kasterlee)
- 212 (Turnhout – Gierle – Lichtaart – Herentals)
- 493 (Geel – Lichtaart – Gierle)
