= Grobbendonk =

- Municipality
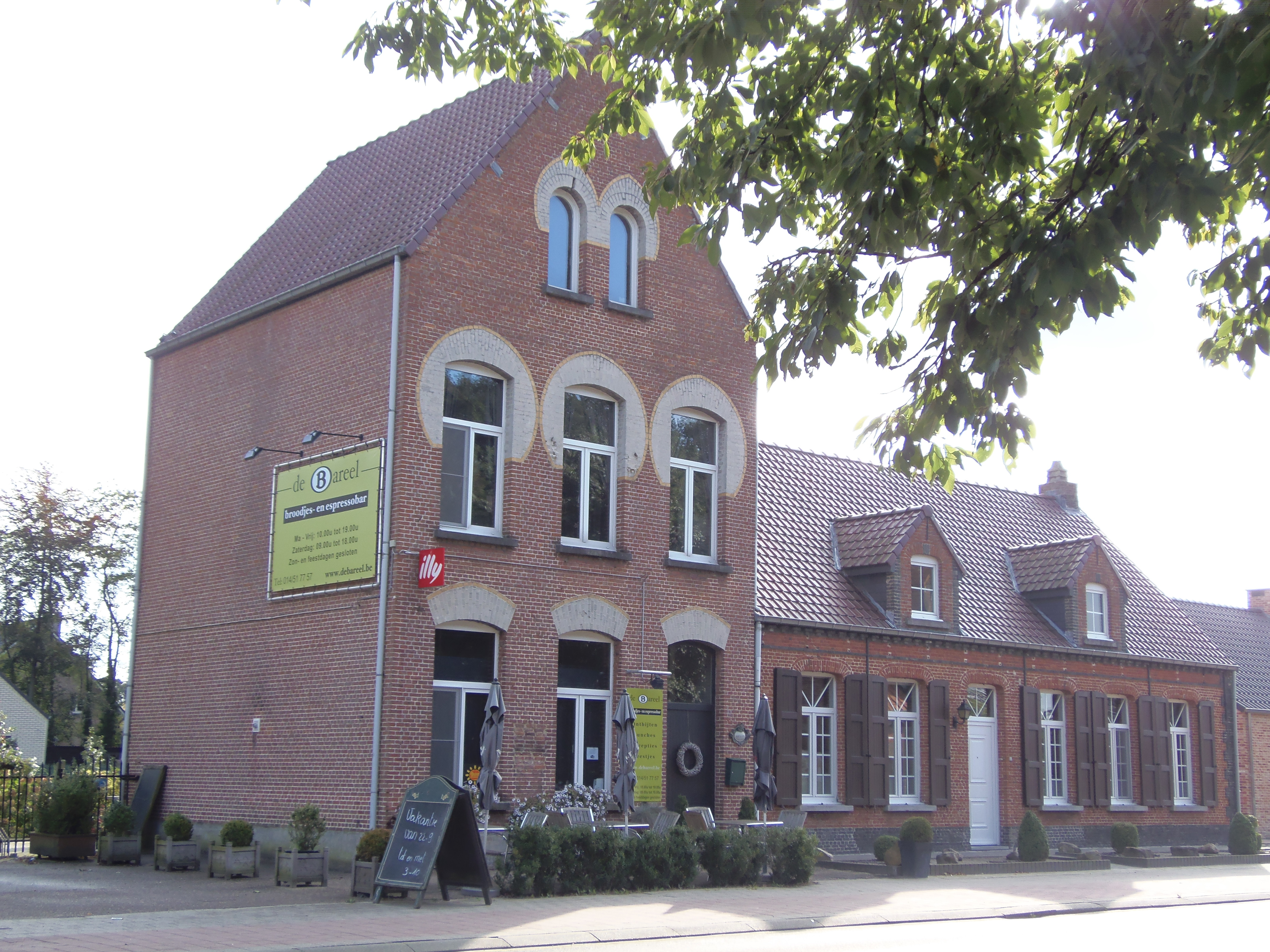

- Flag Coat of arms

- Location of Grobbendonk in the province of Antwerp
- Interactive map of Grobbendonk
- Location in Belgium
- Coordinates: 51°12′N 04°43′E
- Country: Belgium
- Community: Flemish Community
- Region: Flemish Region
- Province: Antwerp
- Arrondissement: Turnhout

Government
  - Mayor: Marianne Verhaert (GiB)
  - Governing parties: Gib (local Open VLD), N-VA

Area
  - Total: 28.37 km^{2} (10.95 sq mi)

Population (2020-01-01)
  - Total: 11,172
  - Density: 393.8/km^{2} (1,020/sq mi)
- Postal codes: 2280, 2288
- NIS code: 13010
- Area codes: 014, 03
- Website: www.grobbendonk.be

Grobbendonk (Dutch pronunciation: [ˈɣrɔbə(n)dɔŋk]) is a municipality located in the Belgian province of Antwerp (Dutch: Antwerpen). The municipality comprises the towns of Bouwel and Grobbendonk proper. In 2021, Grobbendonk had a total population of 11,249. The total area is 28.36 km^{2}.

The official flag of Grobbendonk was adopted in 1989. In terms of heraldry, the flag is quartered, I and IV argent, three hills vert, a bird sable (specifically a raven), II and III gules three fleur-de-lis argent.

== History ==
=== Lordship Grobbendonk ===
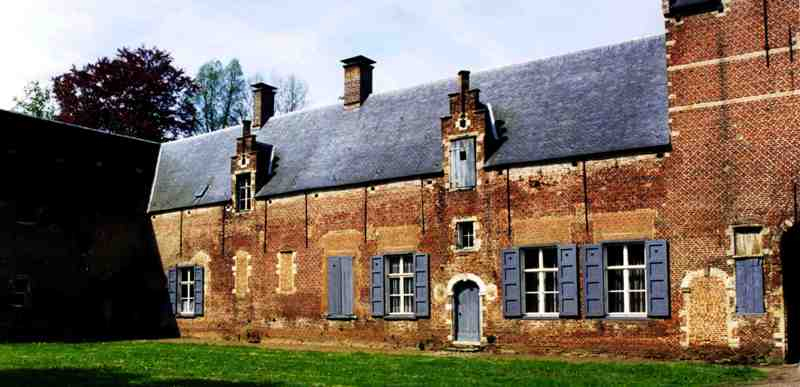
Outer bailey of Grobbendonk Castle

Grobbendonk was known as Ouwen till it was renamed Grobbendonk in about the mid 18th century. This was the name of the Lordship (Heerlijkheid) Grobbendonk, centered on Grobbendonk Castle. In 1545 Erasmus II Schetz became Lord of Grobbendonk. In 1602, his grandson Anthonie II Schetz became the first Baron of Grobbendonck. In 1637, the lords of Grobbendonk became counts of Grobbendonk. In 1726, the dukes of Ursel also became hereditary Count of Grobbendonk.

The French Revolution cancelled the feudal system. It made that in most cases a Heerlijkheid became an almost insignificant title. One of the later lords of Grobbendonk was Marie Joseph Charles, 6th Duke d'Ursel (1848-1903). The head of the house of Ursel is still lord of Grobbendonk.

== Famous inhabitants ==
- Rik Van Looy, cyclist, twice World Cycling Champion
- Herman Van Springel, cyclist, finished second in the Tour de France

== Gallery ==
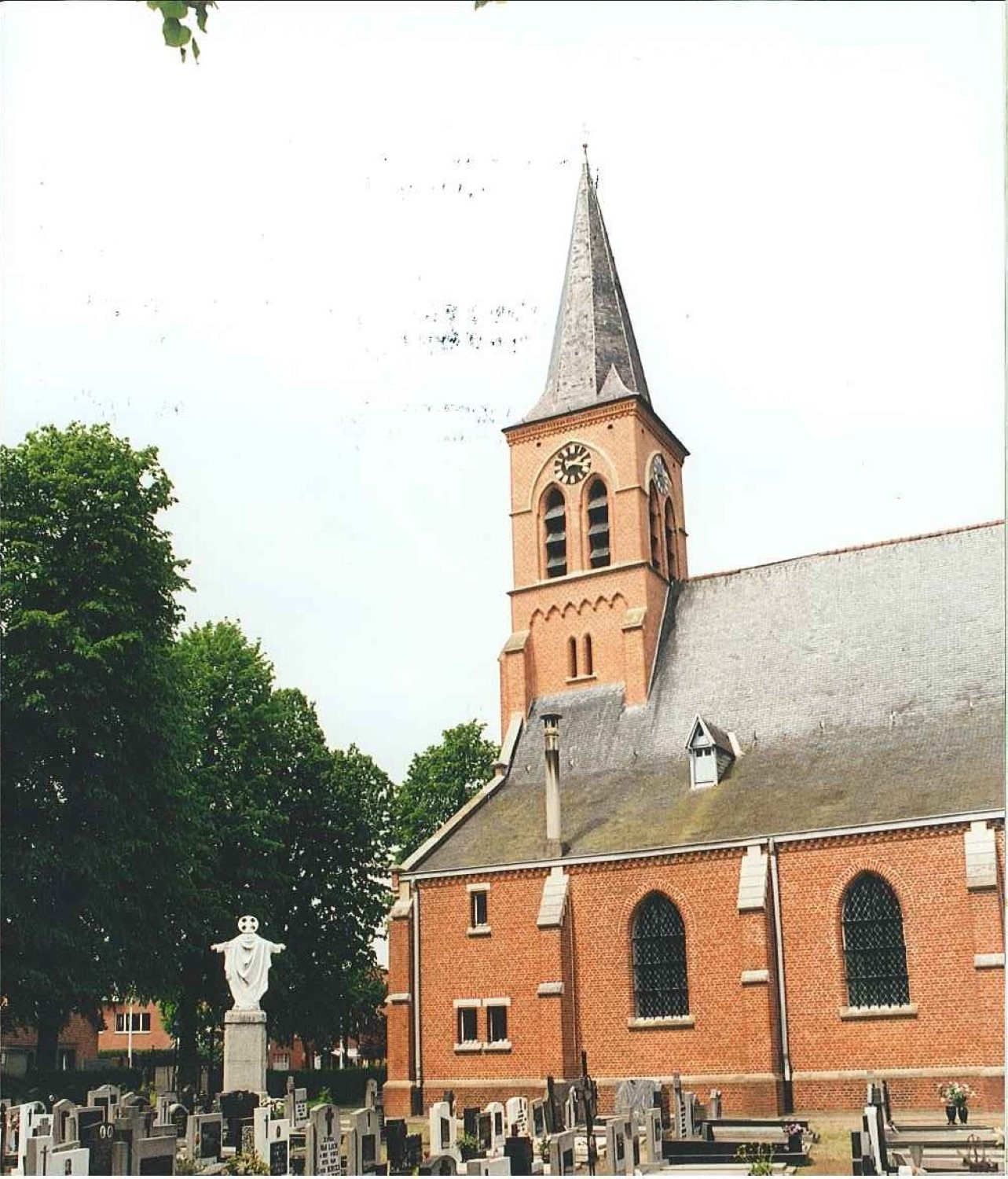
Assumption of Mary Church in Bouwel

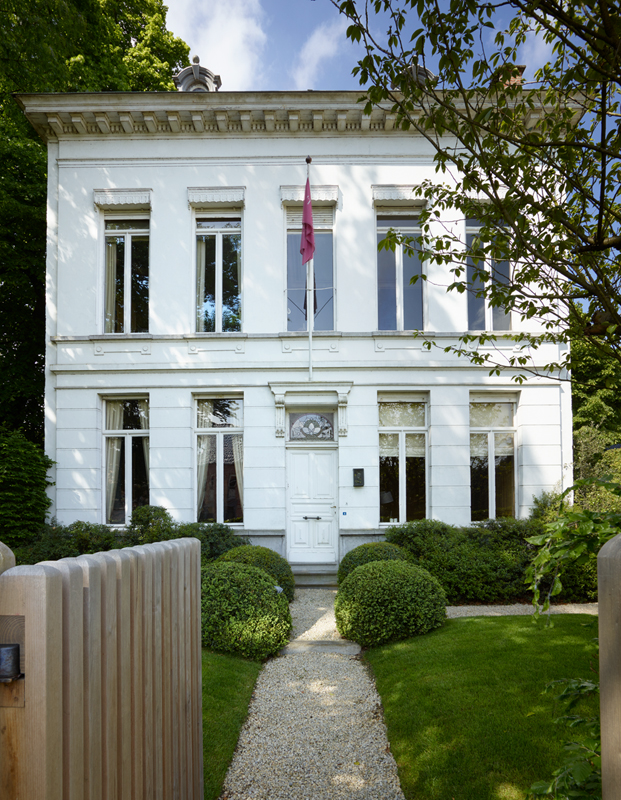
Villa 't Wit Huys

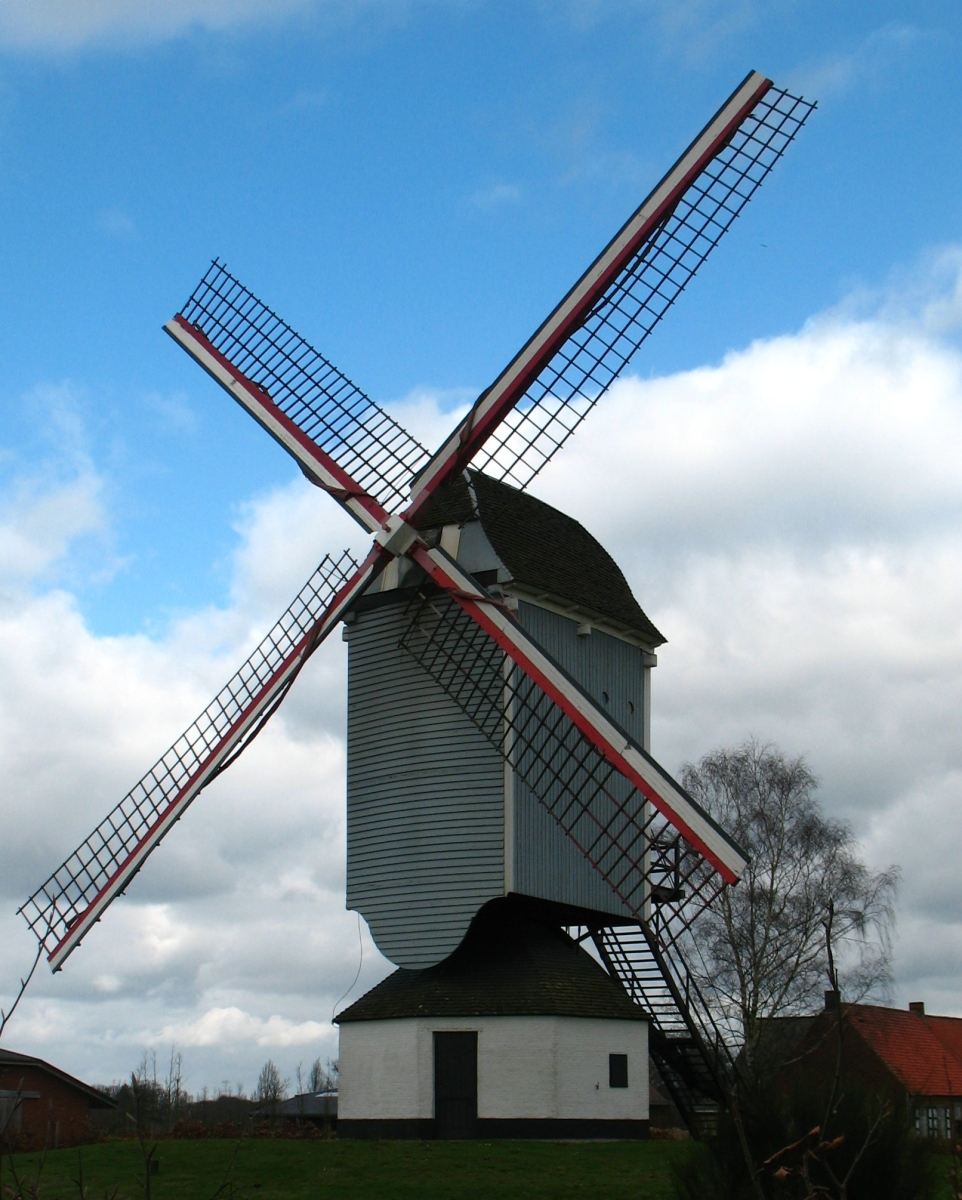
Windmill Molen van Bouwel

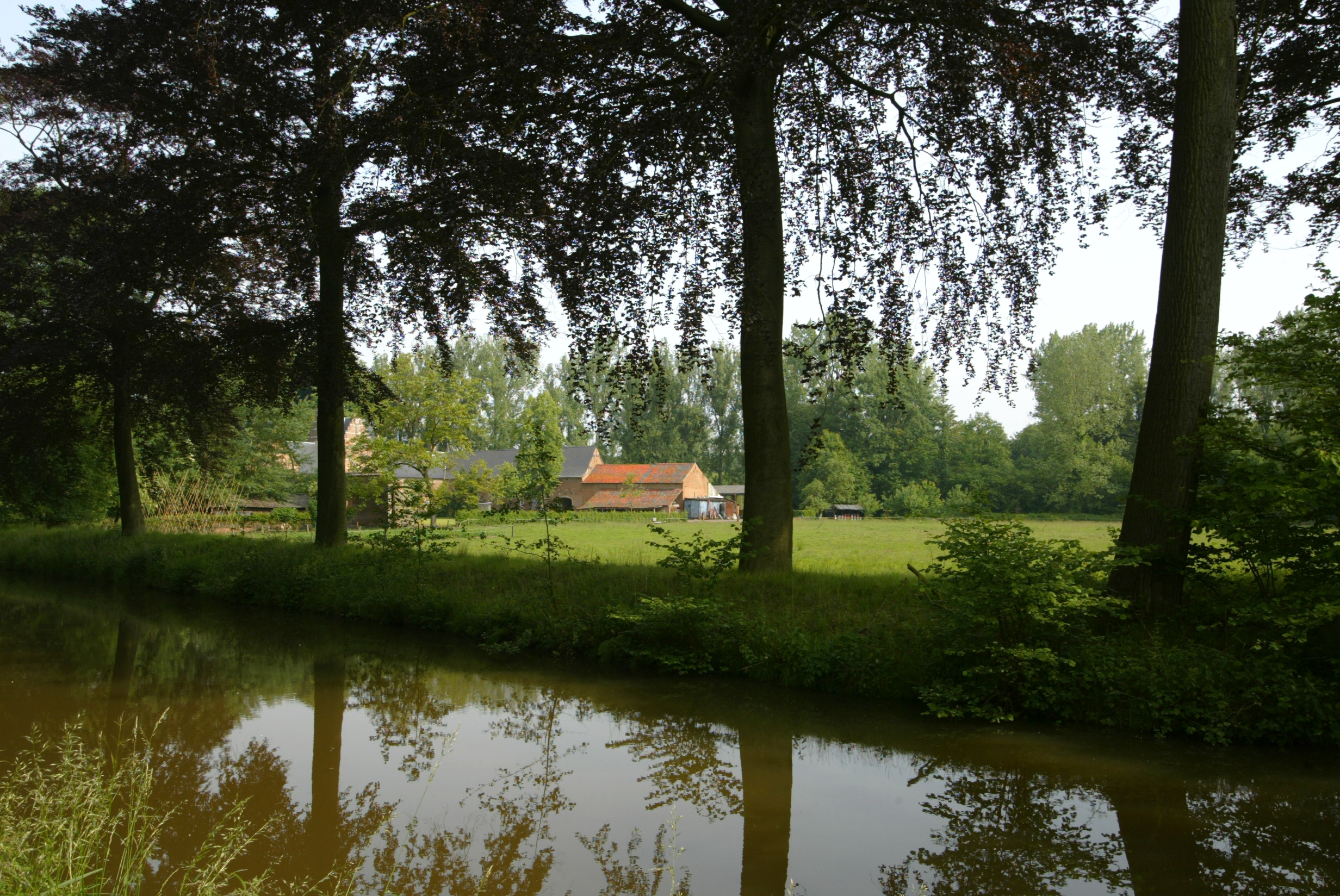
Landscape near Grobbendonk

== Climate ==
Climate data for Grobbendonk (1991−2020 normals)
Month	Jan	Feb	Mar	Apr	May	Jun	Jul	Aug	Sep	Oct	Nov	Dec	Year
Mean daily maximum °C (°F)	6.7 (44.1)	7.7 (45.9)	11.3 (52.3)	15.7 (60.3)	19.3 (66.7)	22.0 (71.6)	24.0 (75.2)	23.8 (74.8)	20.2 (68.4)	15.5 (59.9)	10.4 (50.7)	7.0 (44.6)	15.3 (59.5)
Daily mean °C (°F)	3.8 (38.8)	4.3 (39.7)	7.0 (44.6)	10.3 (50.5)	14.1 (57.4)	17.0 (62.6)	19.0 (66.2)	18.6 (65.5)	15.3 (59.5)	11.4 (52.5)	7.2 (45.0)	4.4 (39.9)	11.1 (52.0)
Mean daily minimum °C (°F)	1.0 (33.8)	0.9 (33.6)	2.7 (36.9)	4.9 (40.8)	8.9 (48.0)	12.0 (53.6)	14.0 (57.2)	13.3 (55.9)	10.4 (50.7)	7.3 (45.1)	4.1 (39.4)	1.7 (35.1)	6.8 (44.2)
Average precipitation mm (inches)	76.0 (2.99)	67.3 (2.65)	59.3 (2.33)	45.9 (1.81)	58.2 (2.29)	75.1 (2.96)	81.3 (3.20)	82.4 (3.24)	72.9 (2.87)	68.0 (2.68)	82.2 (3.24)	96.1 (3.78)	864.9 (34.05)
Average precipitation days (≥ 1.0 mm)	12.8	12.1	11.2	8.8	9.8	10.2	11.0	10.9	10.1	11.1	13.2	14.8	135.9
Mean monthly sunshine hours	60	77	133	187	216	216	221	208	161	116	66	50	1,712
Source: Royal Meteorological Institute
