= Nijlen =

- Municipality
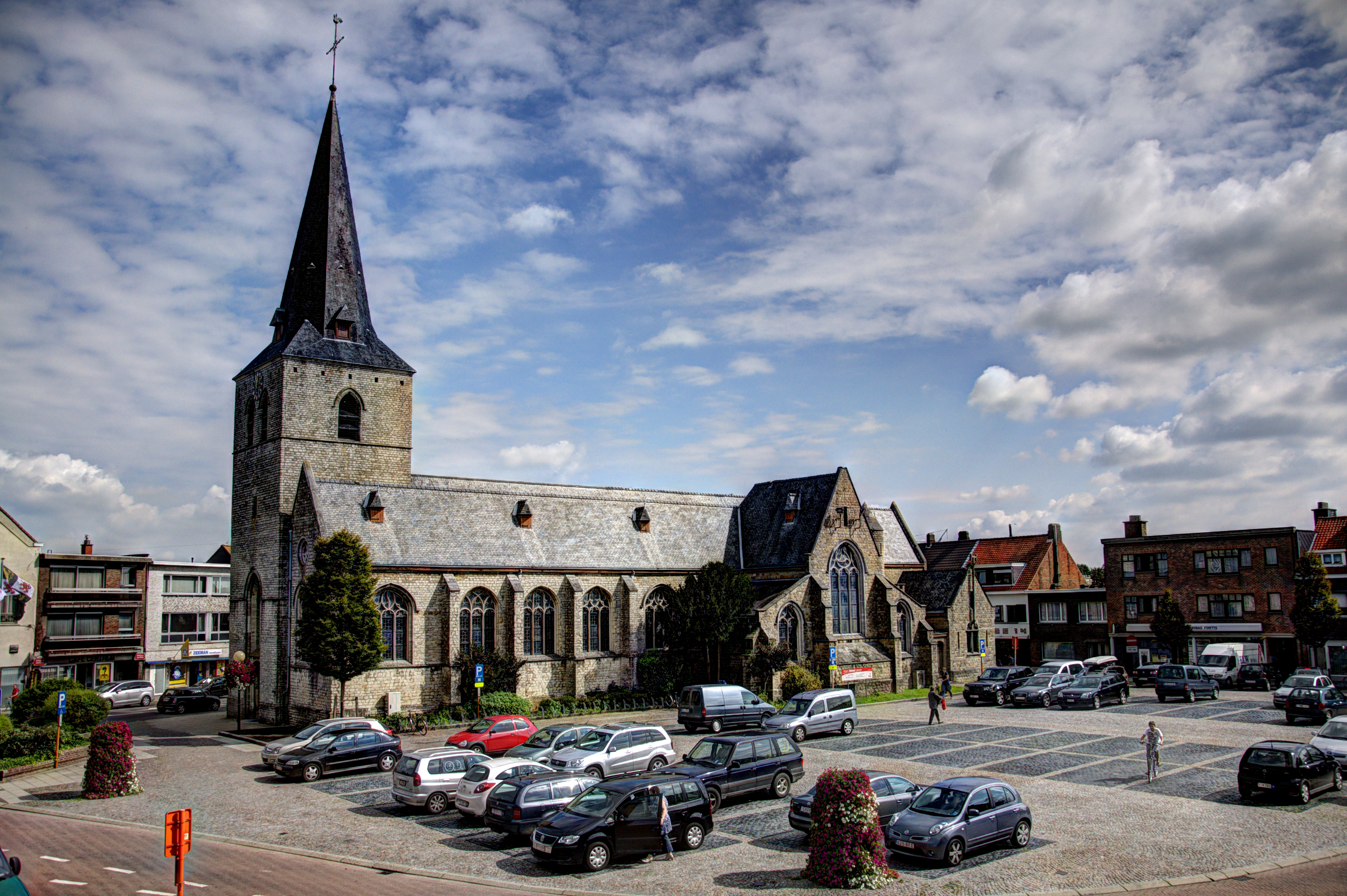

- Flag Coat of arms

- Location of Nijlen in the province of Antwerp
- Interactive map of Nijlen
- Location in Belgium
- Coordinates: 51°10′N 04°39′E
- Country: Belgium
- Community: Flemish Community
- Region: Flemish Region
- Province: Antwerp
- Arrondissement: Mechelen

Government
  - Mayor: Paul Verbeeck (CD&V)
  - Governing parties: CD&V, N&U, Groen, Open-VLD NVA]]

Area
  - Total: 39.2 km^{2} (15.1 sq mi)

Population (2020-01-01)
  - Total: 22,936
  - Density: 585/km^{2} (1,520/sq mi)
- Postal codes: 2560
- NIS code: 12026
- Area codes: 03, 014
- Website: www.nijlen.be

Nijlen (Dutch pronunciation: [ˈnɛilə(n)]) is a municipality located in the Belgian province of Antwerp. The municipality comprises the towns of Bevel, Kessel and Nijlen proper. In 2021, Nijlen had a total population of 22,985. The total area is 39.09 km^{2}.

== History ==
In 1770, a hoard of golden coins dating from Julius Caesar to Titus Flavius Domitianus was discovered. Nijlen was first mentioned in 1146 as having possessions of Tongerlo Abbey. The village was damaged during the Reformation and nearly depopulated. In the 18th century, there was a population increase which accelerated after the railway station on the line from Antwerp to Herentals opened in 1853. Around 1875, diamond industry started in Nijlen which became the second most importance centre for diamonds after Antwerp in Belgium.

== Notable inhabitants ==
- Libera Carlier (b. Nijlen, 19 January 1926 – 25 April 2007)
- Jozef Van Hove (b. Berchem, 16 November 1919 - 2 May 2014)

== Gallery ==
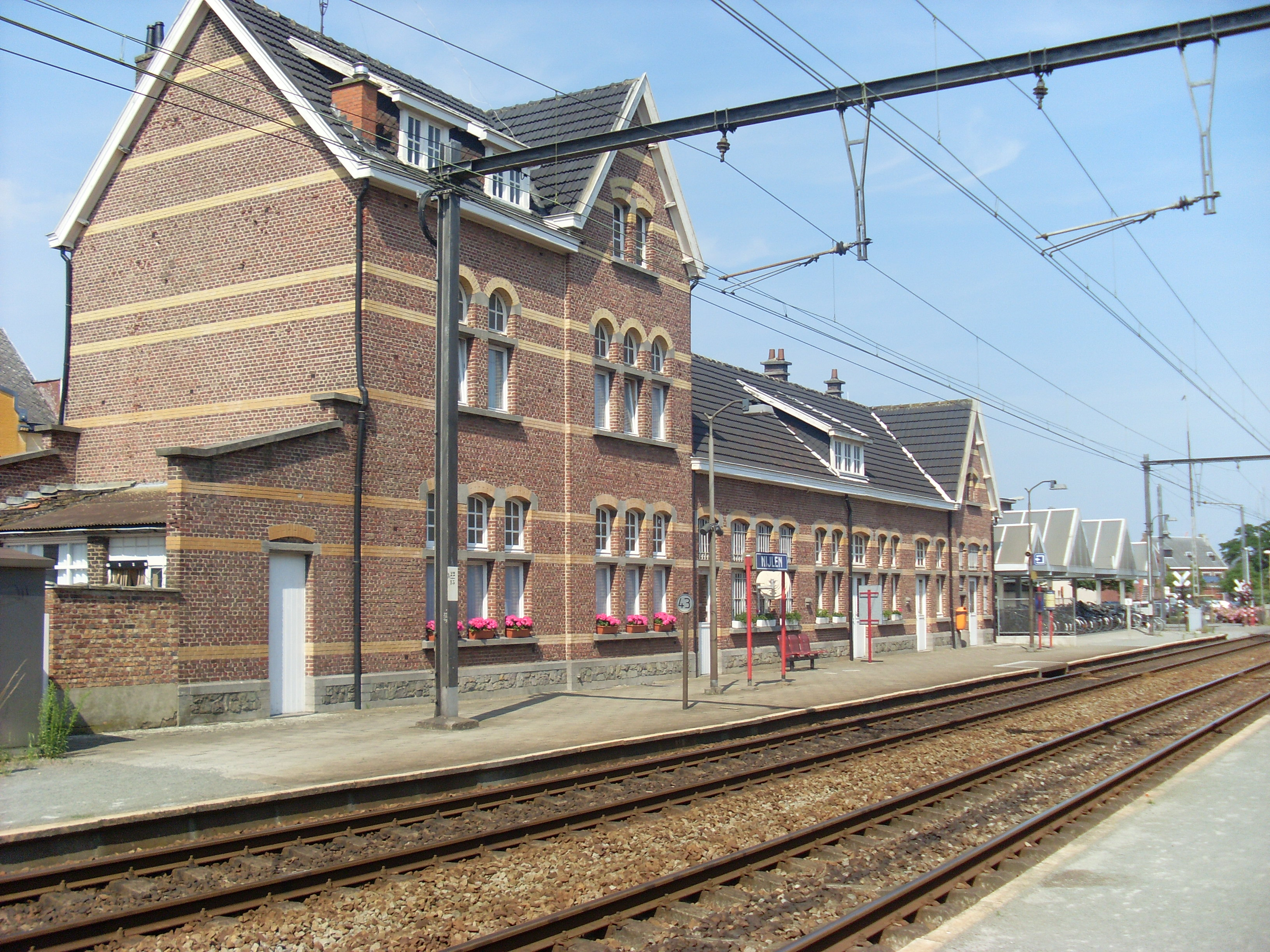
Railway station Nijlen

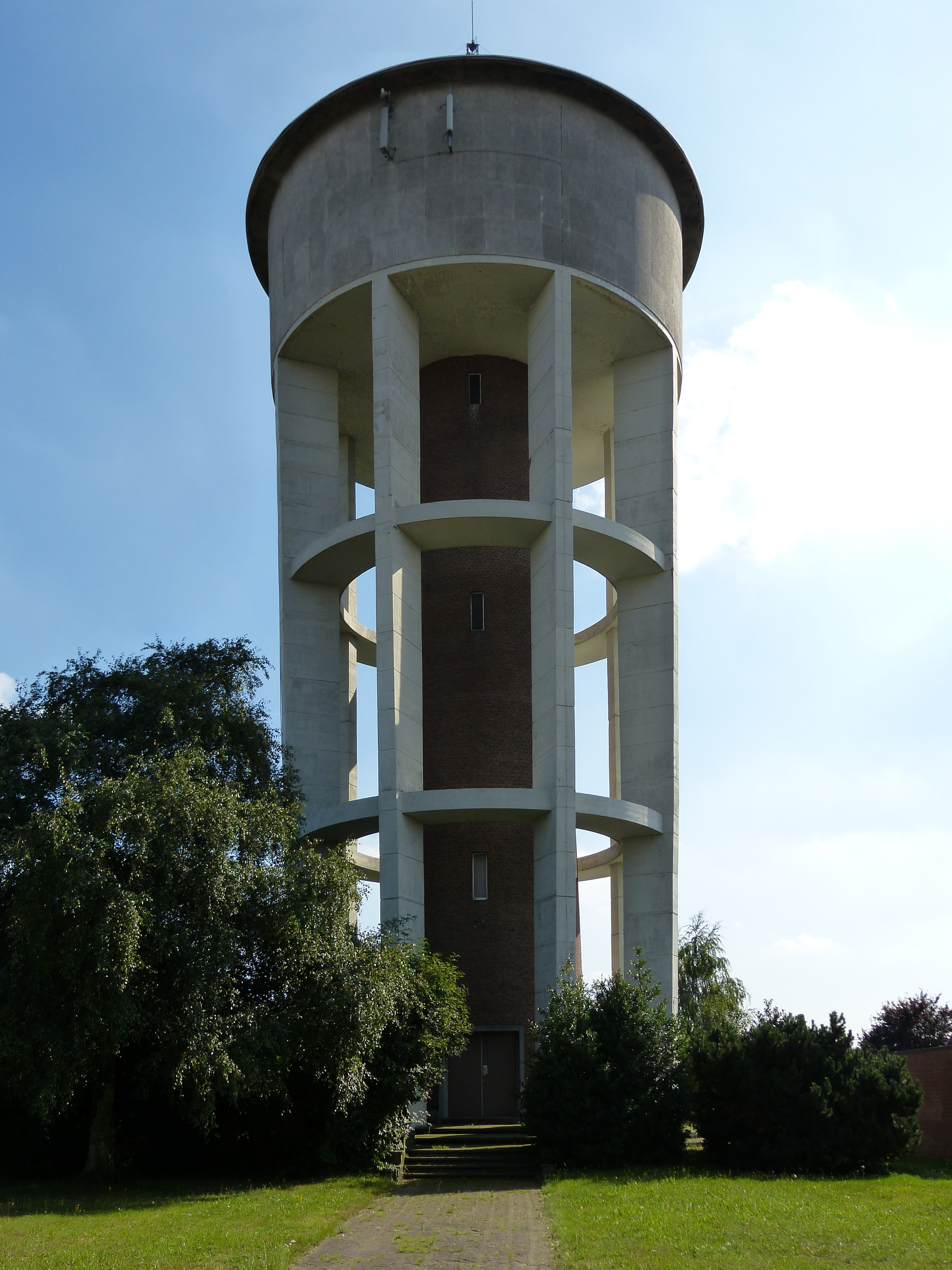
Water tower

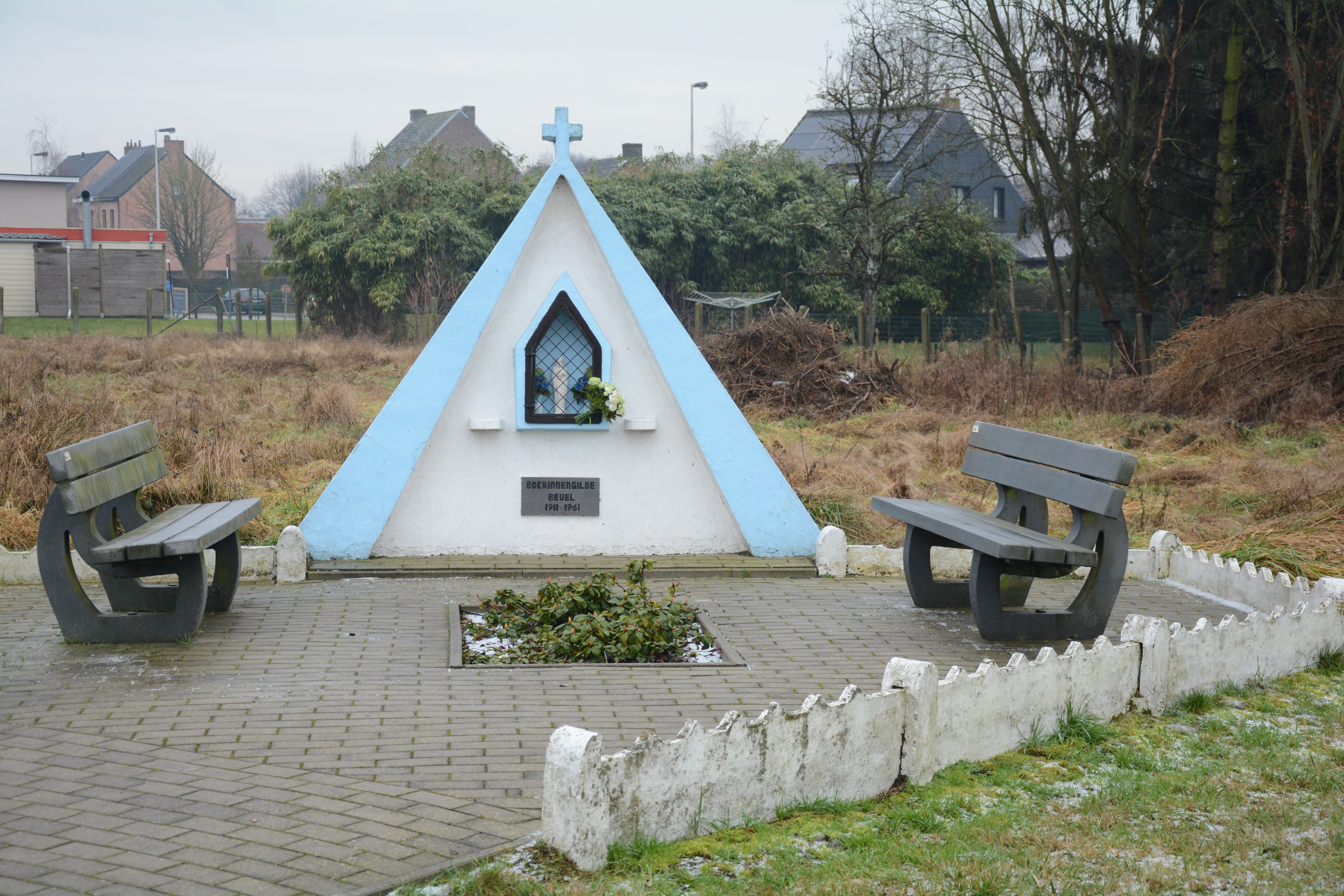
Boerinnengilde Chapel in Bevel

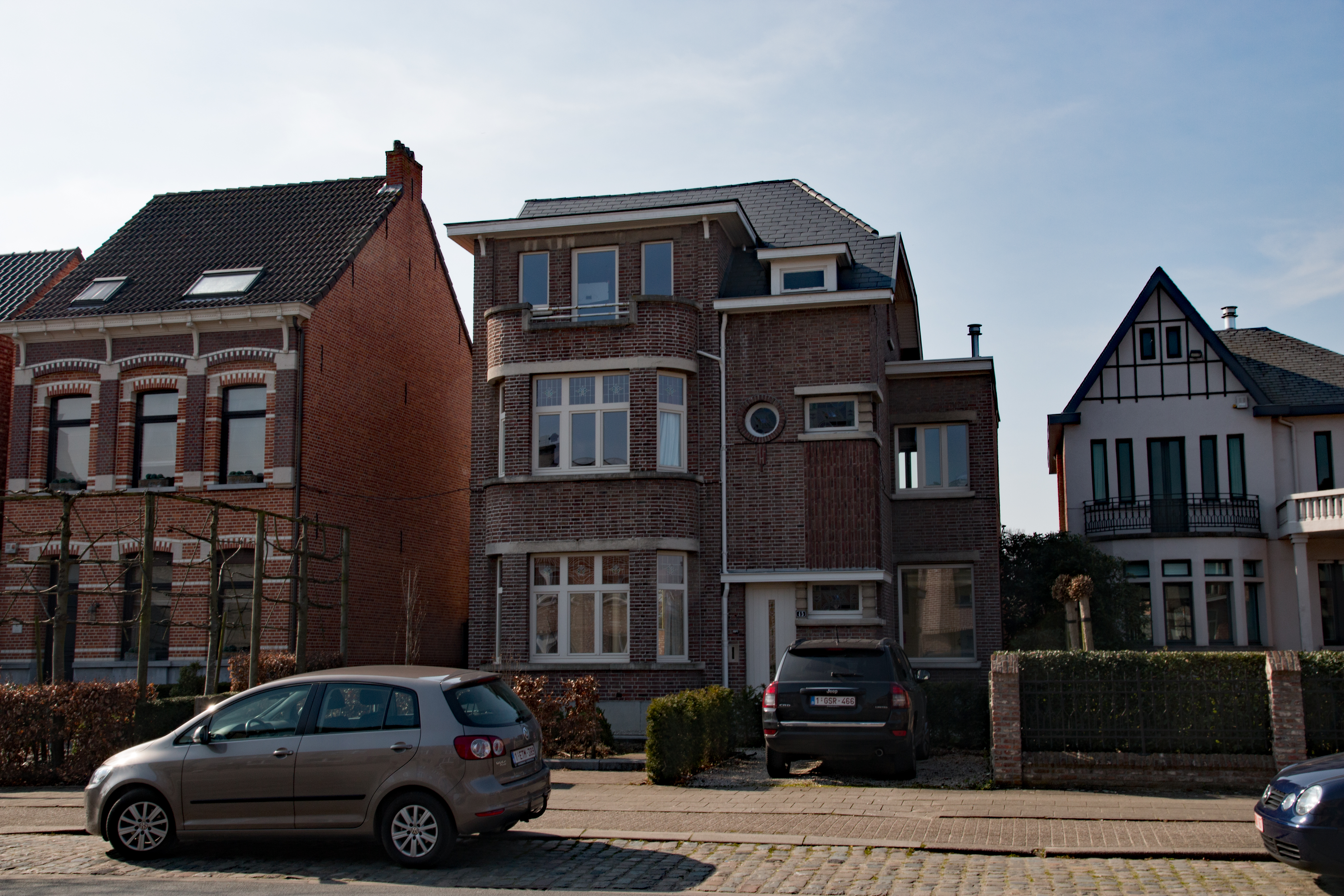
Houses in Nijlen
