= Kessel, Belgium =

Kessel
- Town
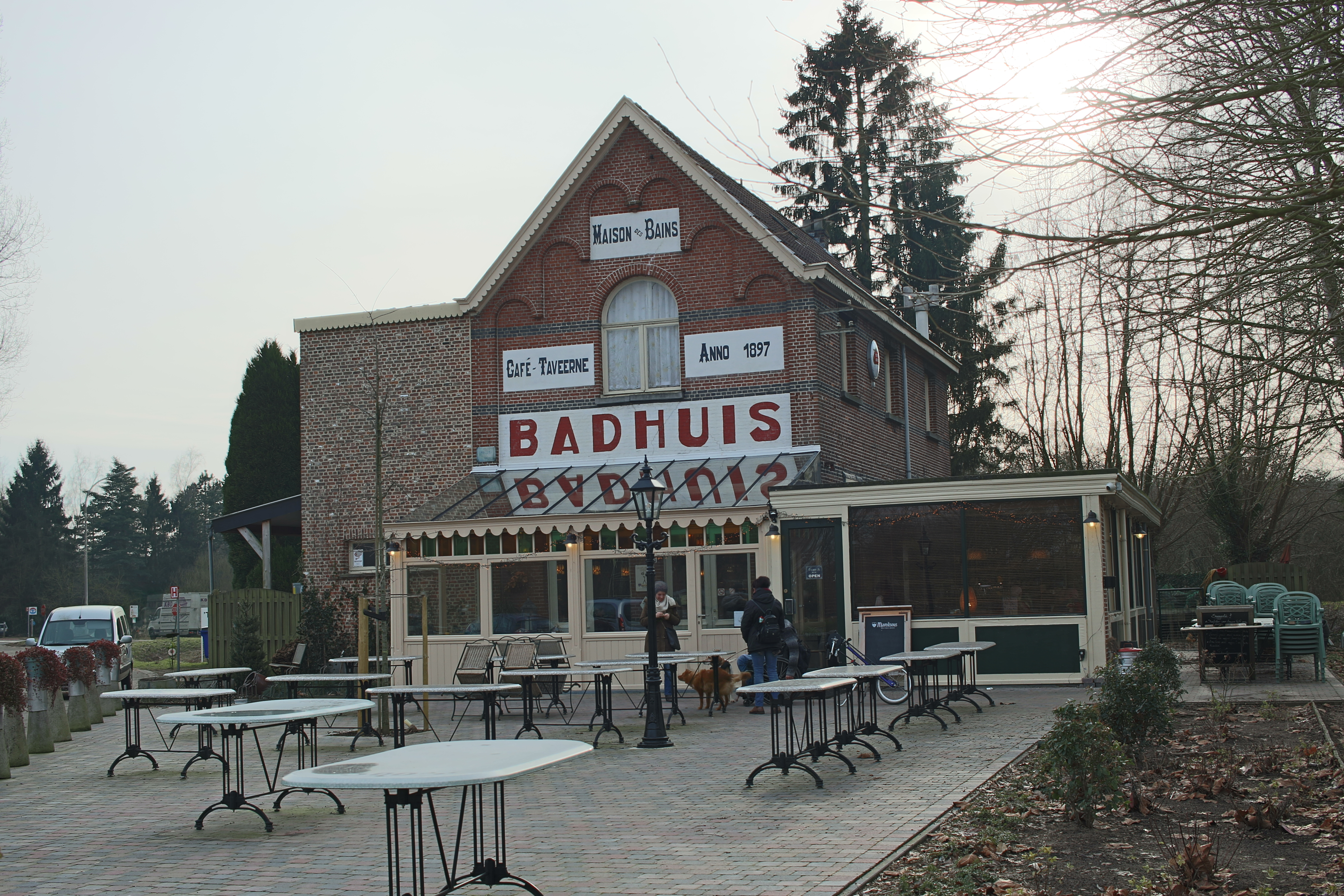
- Pub The Bath House

- Location in Belgium
- Coordinates: 51.1387°N 4.62876°E
- Country: Belgium
- Region: Flemish Region
- Province: Antwerp
- Municipality: Nijlen

Area
  - Total: 14.87 km^{2} (5.74 sq mi)

Population (2021)
  - Total: 700,485
  - Density: 47,110/km^{2} (122,000/sq mi)
- Time zone: CET

Kessel ([ˈkɛs.əl]) is a town in the municipality of Nijlen in the province of Antwerp in Belgium. In 2006, the population was 7,207 inhabitants. Kessel is known for its tourist attractions, such as "de Kesselse Heide" (a nature reserve) and "Fort Kessel" (a fortress built for World War I).

Kessel lies between two rivers: the Kleine Nete in the north and the Grote Nete in the south. It borders with Emblem, Nijlen, Bevel, Berlaar and Lier. Although Kessel is a fairly small town, it has 2 separate town centres, Kessel-Dorp, which is built up around the town square, and Kessel-station, which is built up around the train station.

The name Kessel comes from the Latin word Castellum (fortress), indicating that Kessel might have been the location for an old Roman camp. In 1912, another Fortress was built, in order to withstand a German invasion. During World War I, German artillery fire from Berlaar made the fort useless, though it still stands until this day and was given the status of Protected Monument by the Belgian government.

== Sports ==
The Kessel-Fort is a September cyclo-cross competition.

== Gallery ==
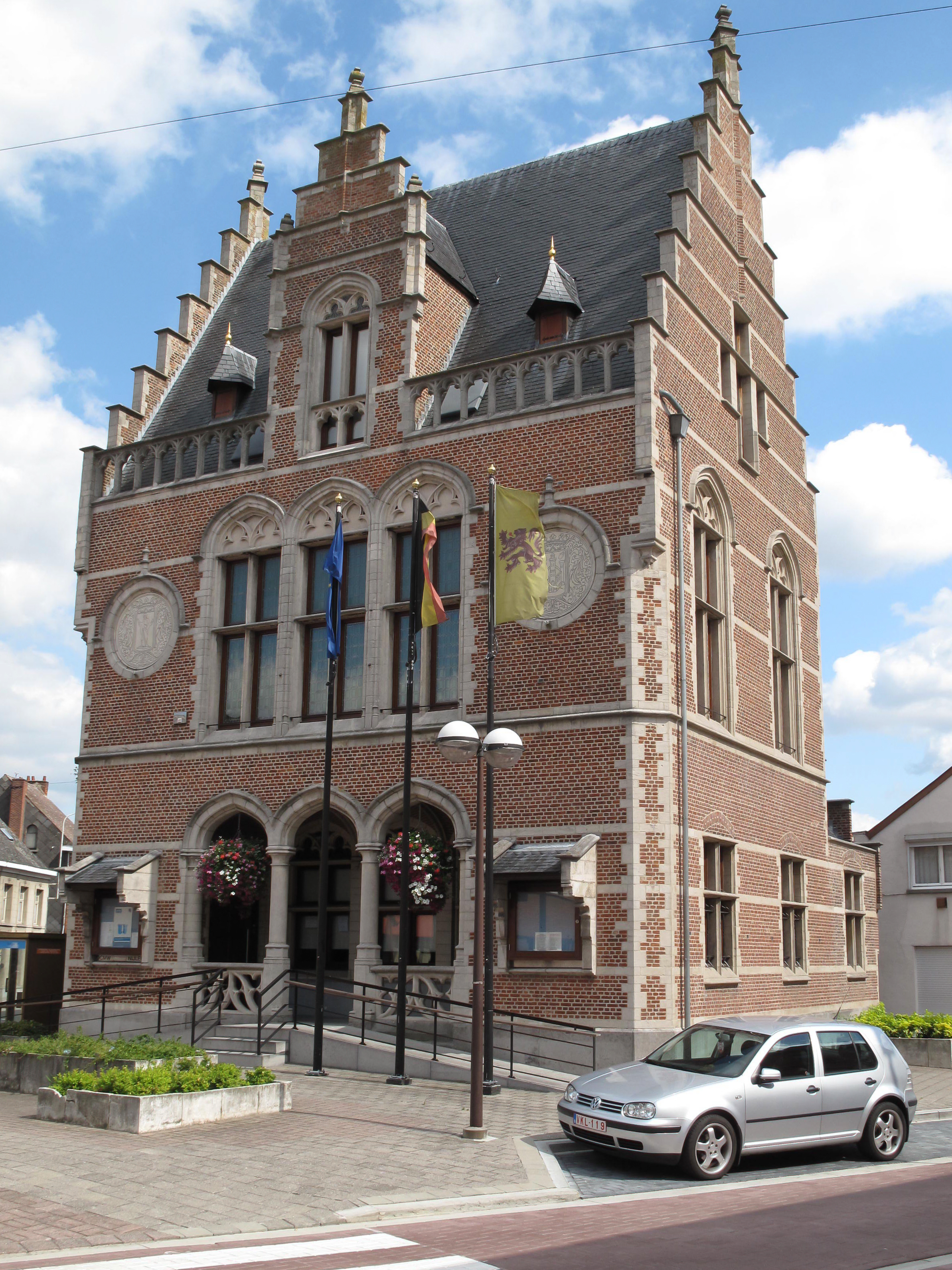
Old city hall

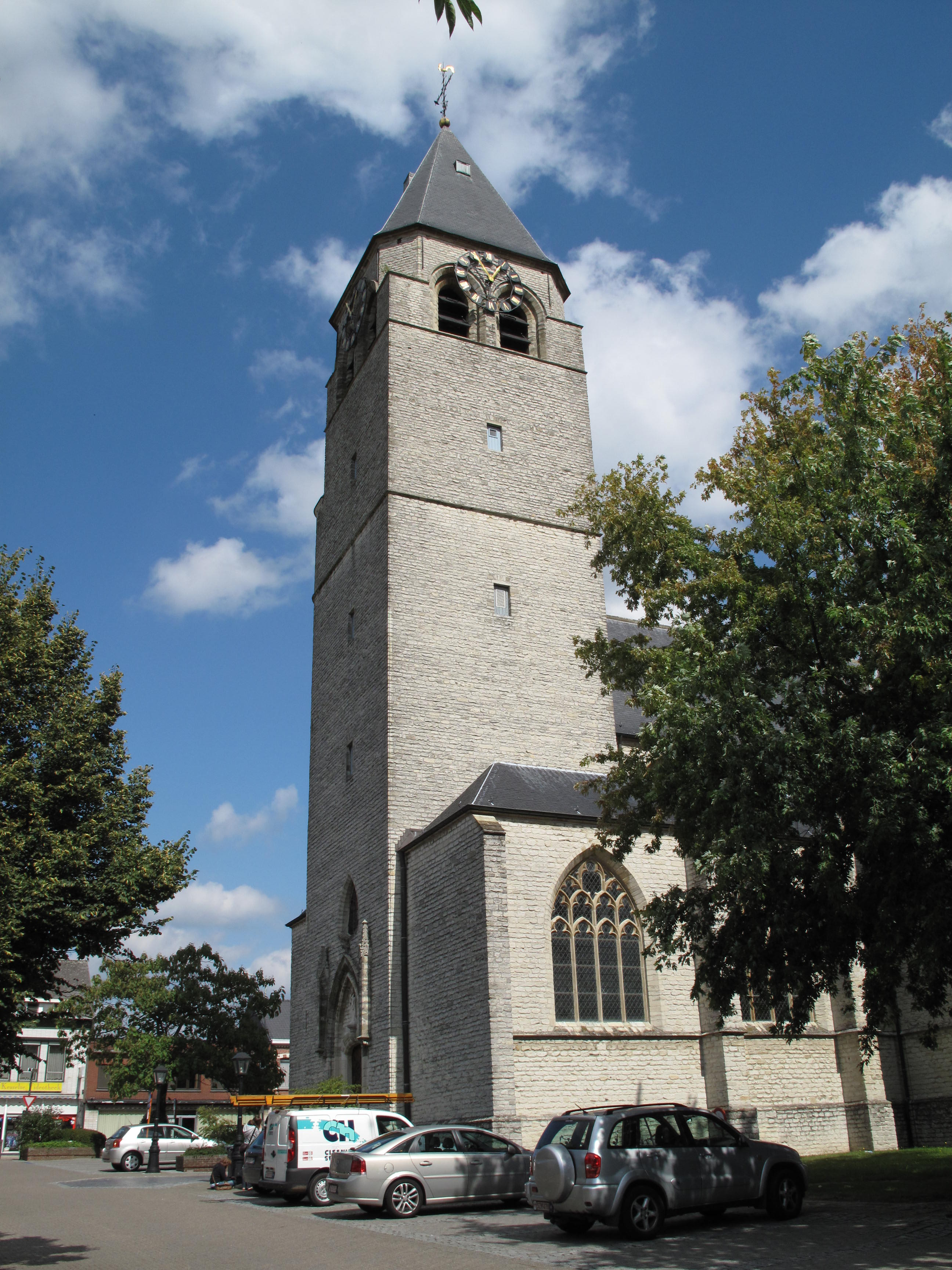
Sint-Lambertus church

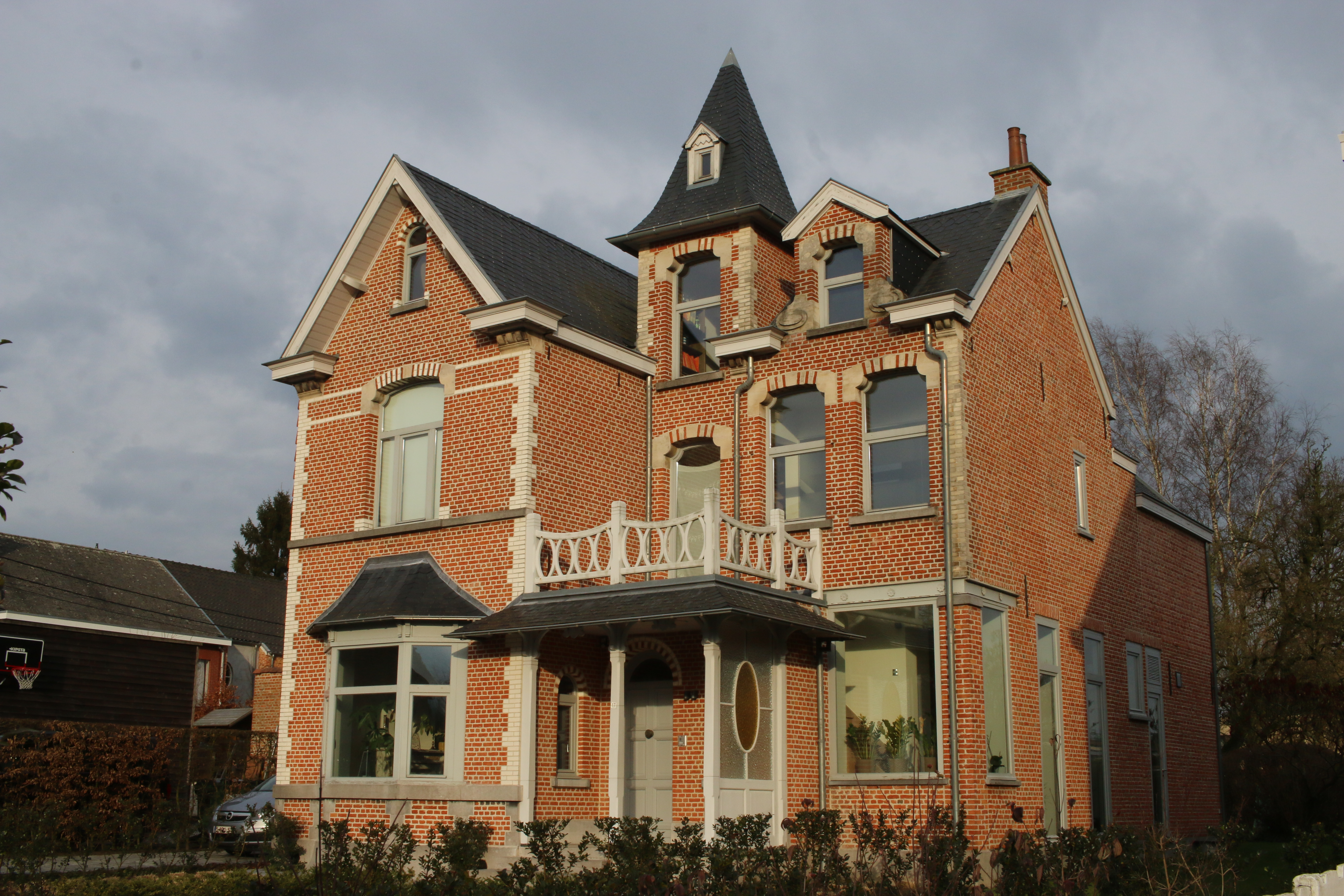
Villa in Kessel
