= Bouwel =

- Village
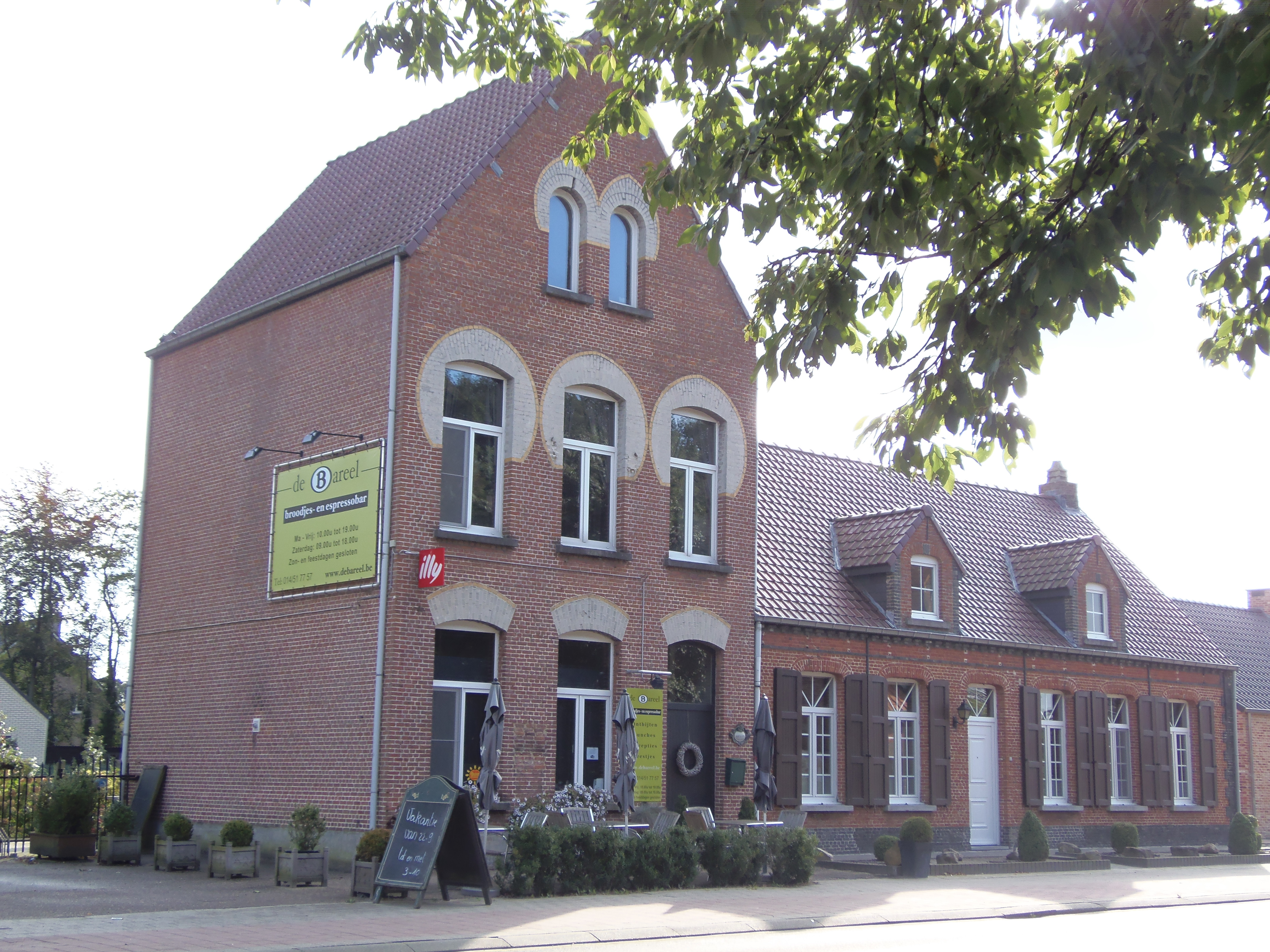
- Old post office, Bouwel

- Location in Belgium
- Country: Belgium
- Region: Flemish Region
- Province: Antwerp
- Municipality: Grobbendonk

Area
  - Total: 6.49 km^{2} (2.51 sq mi)

Population (2021)
  - Total: 3,067
  - Density: 473/km^{2} (1,220/sq mi)
- Time zone: CET

Bouwel is a deelgemeente in the Belgian province of Antwerp; it is attached to the municipality of Grobbendonk.

The village was first mentioned in 994 or 997 as Odlobolo. Bouwel used to be owned by the Lords of Grobbendonk until 1487, when it became an independent heerlijkheid. The domain of the Bouwelhof Castle covered the northern eastern part of Bouwel.

Bouwel was an independent municipality until 1977 when it became part of Grobbendonk.

The grist mill Molen van Bouwen is a wooden windmill. The first windmill was built between 1789 and 1791, but set on fire in October 1914. In 1925, a new windmill was built. In November 1940, a sail was lost in a storm, and no longer in service after the war. In 1973, it was restored. Even though it is used as a holiday home, the wind mill is regularly in service and grinds grain.

== Gallery ==
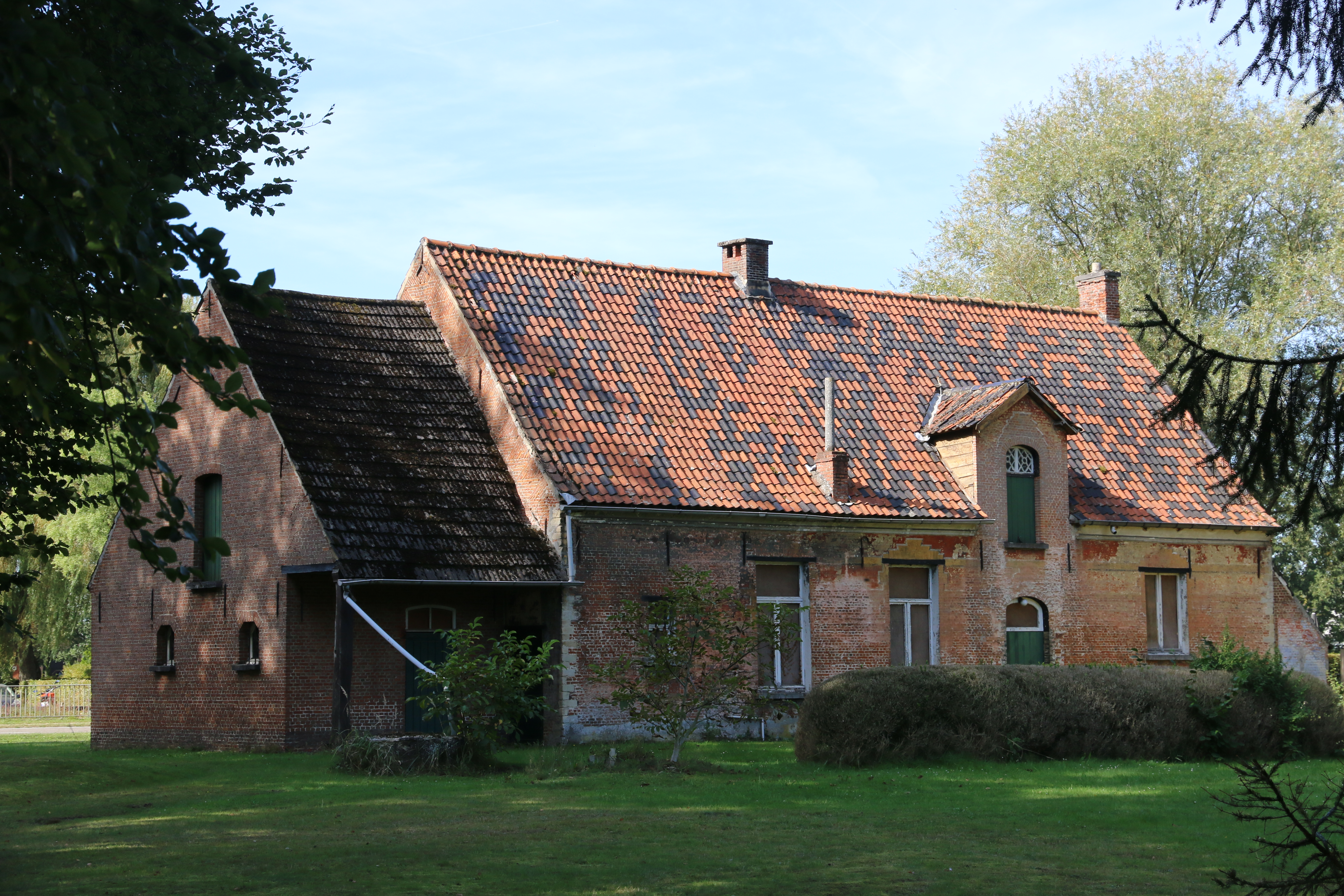
Land agent residence

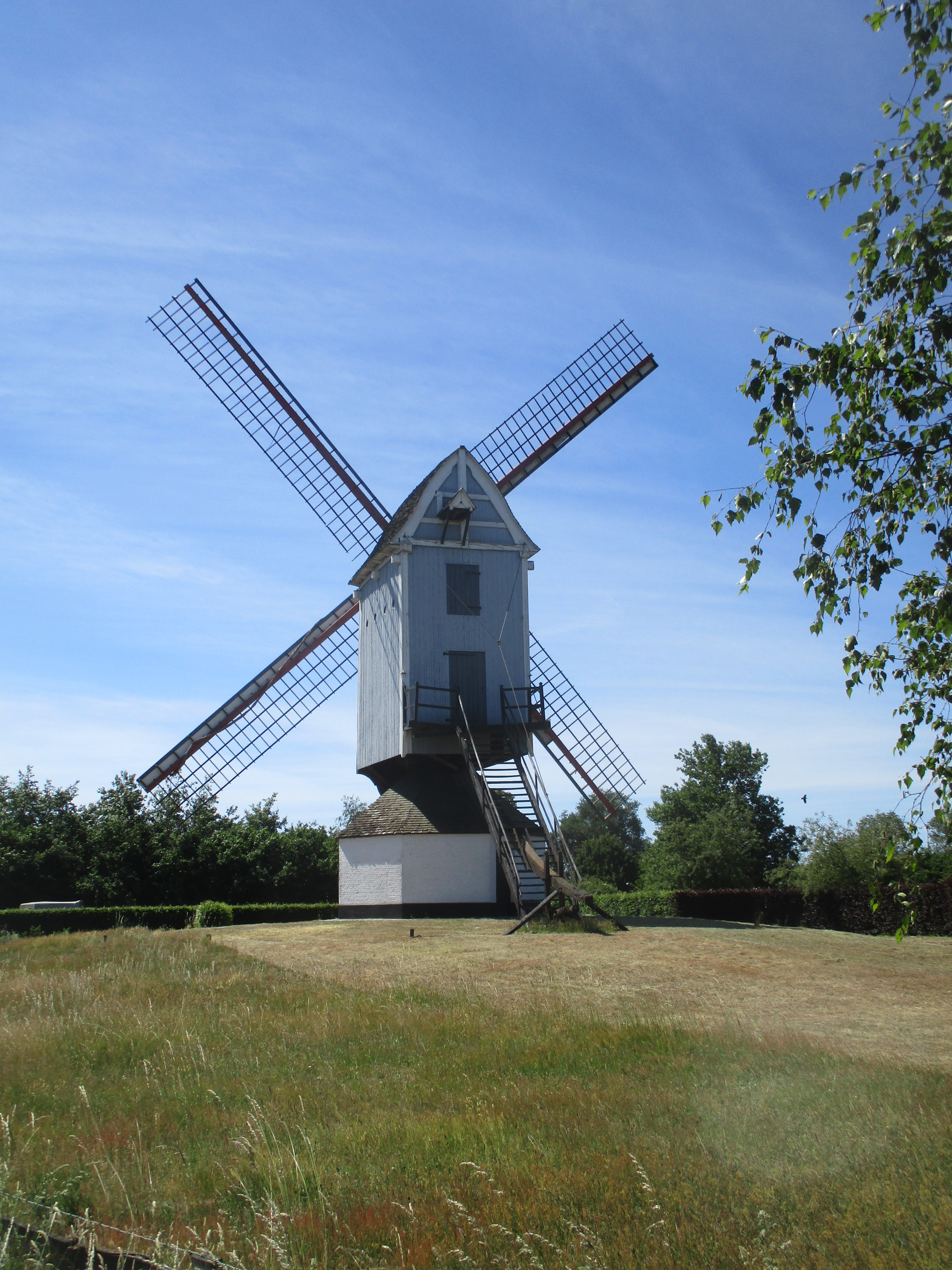
Windmill Molen van Bouwen

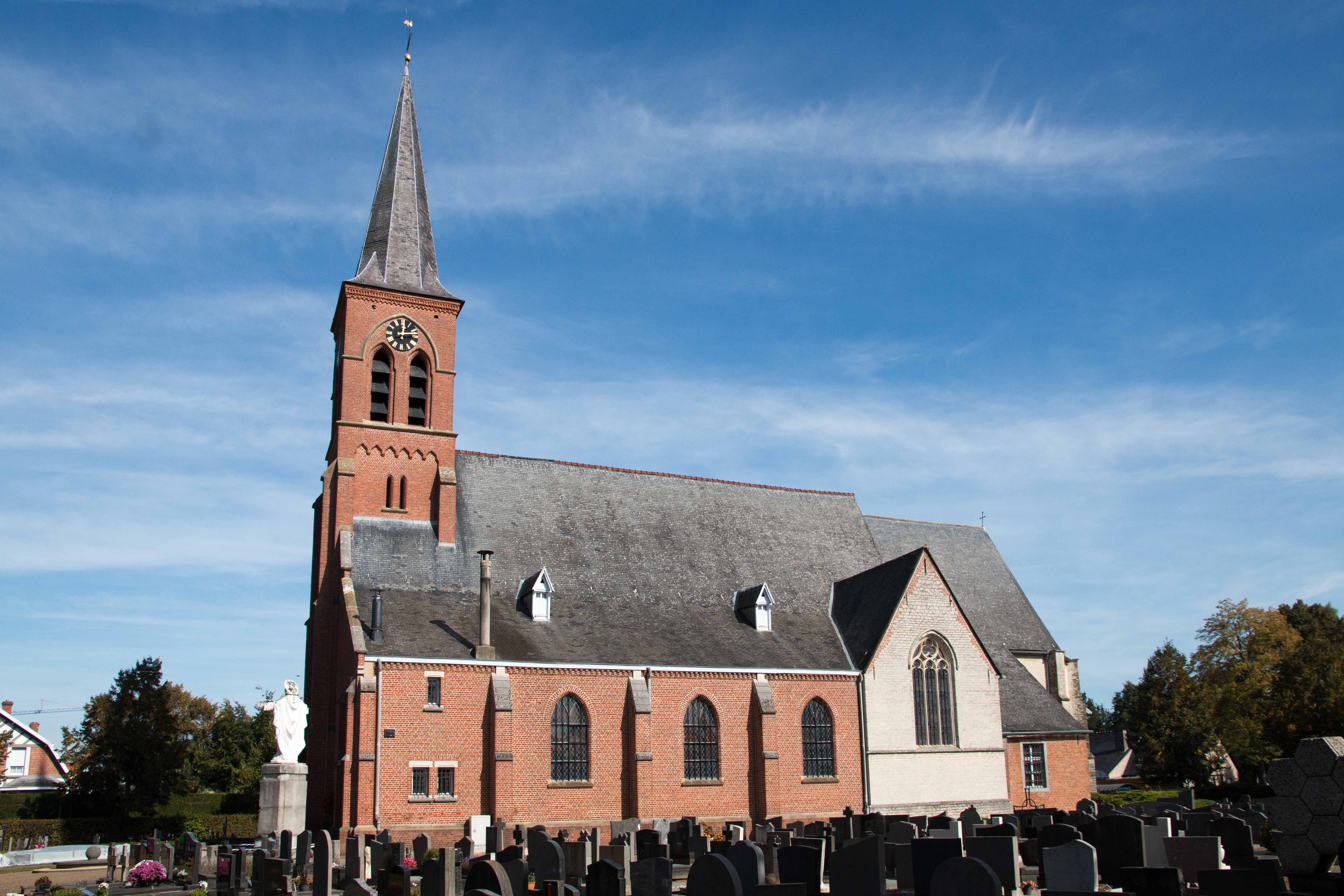
Assumption of Mary Church

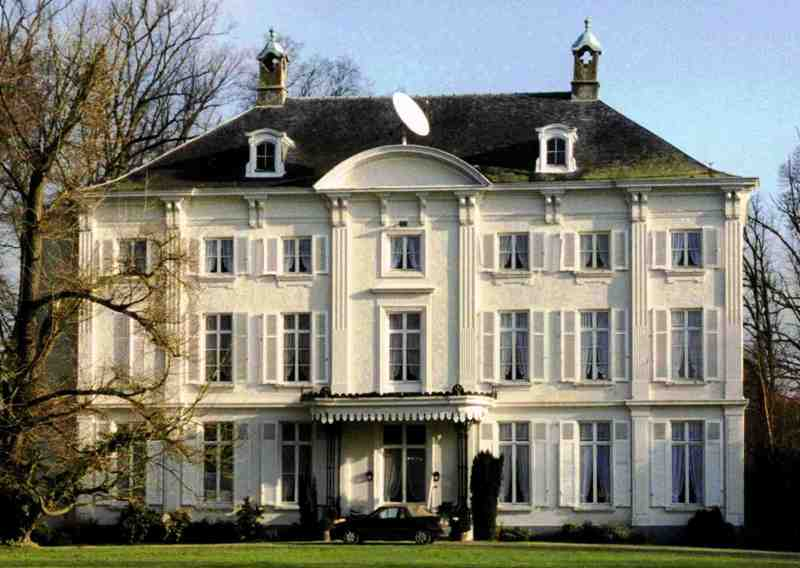
Bouwelhof Castle
