= Turnhout railway station =

Railway station in Antwerp, Belgium

Turnhout
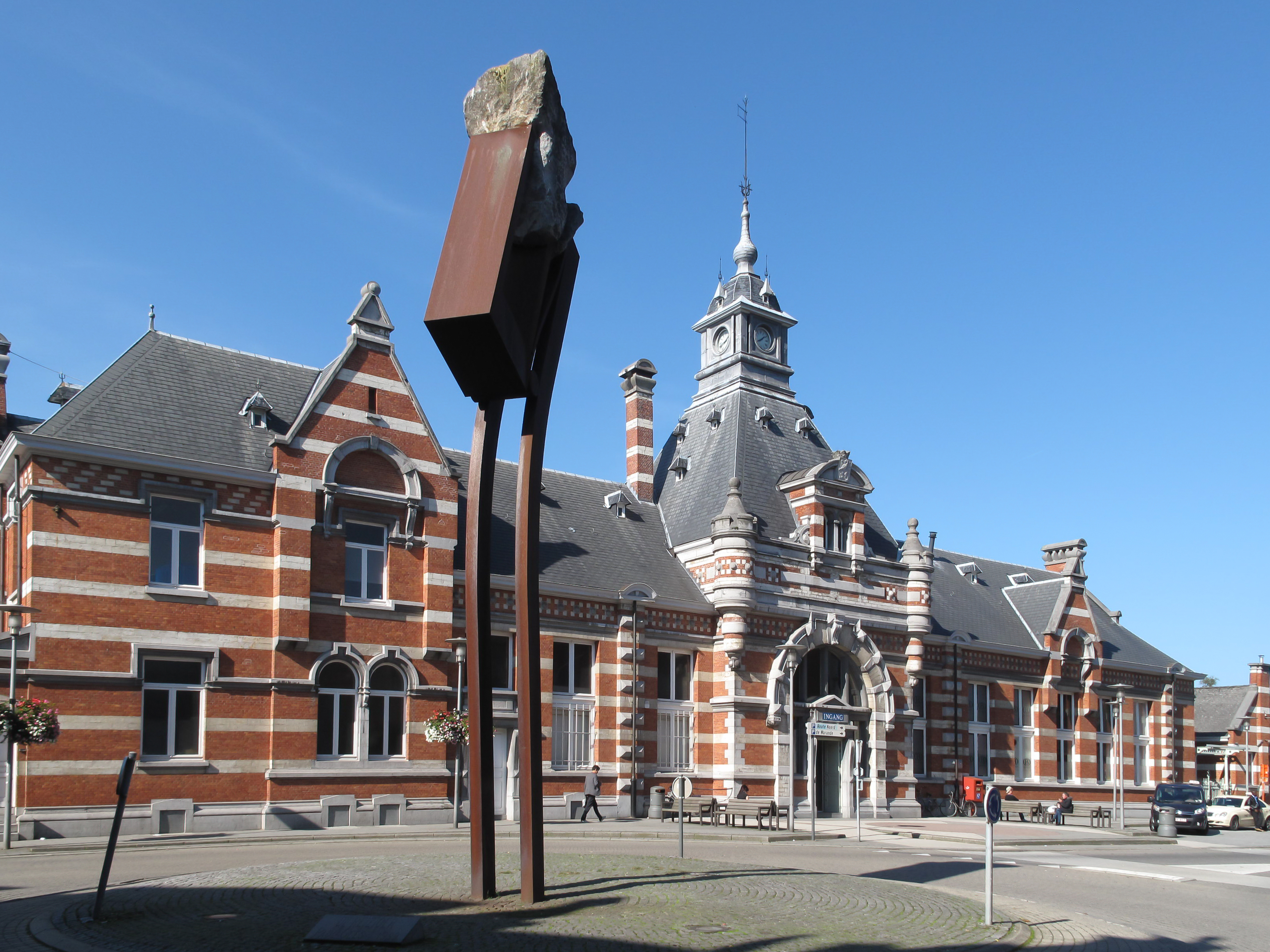
- Turnhout railway station

General information
- Location: Turnhout, Antwerp; Belgium
- Coordinates: 51°19′20″N 4°56′20″E
- System: Railway Station
- Owner: NMBS/SNCB
- Operator: NMBS/SNCB
- Line: 29
- Platforms: 2
- Tracks: 2

History
- Opened: 23 April 1855; 171 years ago
Location
- Location within Belgium Location within Europe

Turnhout railway station (Dutch: Station Turnhout; French: Gare de Turnhout) (Note: Officially Turnhout) is a railway station in Turnhout, Antwerp, Belgium. The station opened on 23 April 1855 and is located on railway line 29. The train services are operated by the National Railway Company of Belgium (NMBS/SNCB).

The station is located at the intersection of Stationstraat and Merodelei streets. The exterior and the interior of the station building preserve most of the original features from 1896, the construction year, and the building is listed as protected.

== History ==
The station was opened in 1855 as part of the railway Turnhout — Herentals — Lier. The first station building was made of wood. It is not known who the architect was, and not a single photograph survived; only verbal descriptions and one lithograph made in 1888 exist. In 1862 a connection from Herentals to Leuven was opened, followed by a connection across the Dutch border to Tilburg (Bels Lijntje), and the old station building was judged too small to process the increased passenger traffic.

In 1896, the current building was constructed in the eclectic style, consisting of a Renaissance Revival external facade and a neoclassicist tracks side, from red bricks and limestone. The architect was E. de Rudder. The deck was moved here from Antwerpen Oost station.

The opening of the station lead to the development of the surrounding area catering to tourists and travellers. In particular, a hotel, Grand Monarque, was built opposite to the station. It was eventually demolished in 1979.

The line to Tilburg lost the competition with bus companies. The passenger traffic stopped in 1934, and the line was closed in 1973. It was demolished and replaced by a bicycle path.

== Train services ==
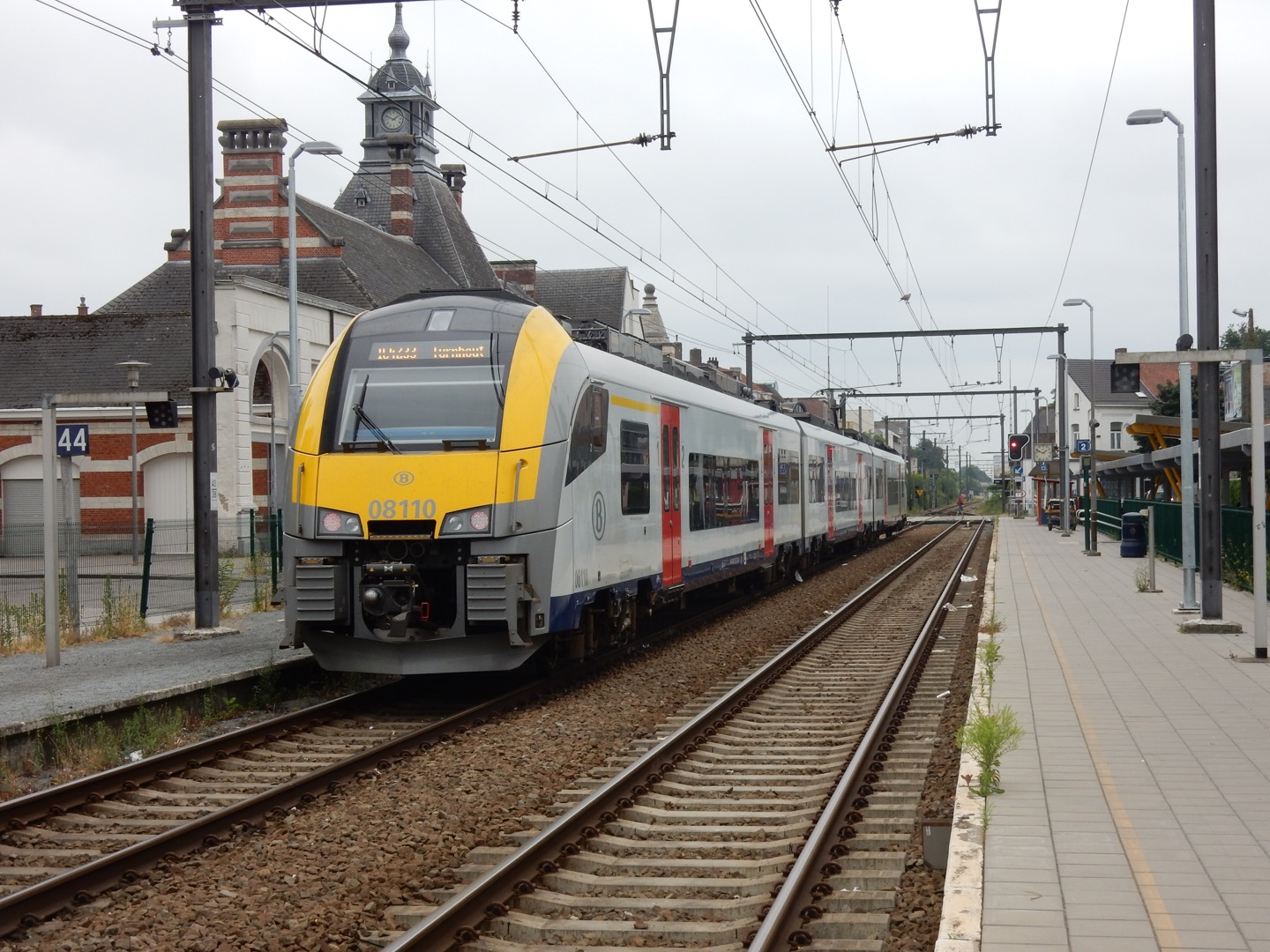
MS08 trainset at Turnhout station

The station is served by the following services:

- Intercity services (IC-11) Binche - Braine-le-Comte - Halle - Brussels - Mechelen - Turnhout (weekdays)
- Intercity services (IC-30) Antwerp - Herentals - Turnhout

Preceding station	NMBS/SNCB	Following station
Tielen towards Binche	IC 11 weekdays	Terminus
Tielen towards Antwerpen-Centraal	IC 30	Terminus

== Bus services ==
The following bus services stop near the station. They are operated by De Lijn.

- 1 (Zevendonk – Markt – Vosselaar – Beerse)
- 2 (Boomgaardplein – Markt – Station – Parkwijk)
- 200 (Turnhout – Vosselaar – Tielen – Kasterlee)
- 210 (Turnhout – Lille – Herentals)
- 212 (Turnhout – Gierle – Lichtaart – Herentals)
- 213 (Turnhout – Lille – Vorselaar – Grobbendonk)
- 305 (Turnhout – Herentals – Herselt – Aarschot – Leuven)
- 410 (Turnhout – Malle – Antwerpen)
- 415 (Turnhout – Beerse – Antwerpen) Express
- 416 (Turnhout – Wechelderzaande – Antwerpen) Express
- 417 (Turnhout – Zoersel – Antwerpen) Express
- 419 (Turnhout – Malle – Sint-Antonius – Zandhoven)
- 430 (Meersel-dreef – Hoogstraaten – Turnhout – Mol)
- 431 (Oud-Turnhout – Turnhout – Beerse – Rijkevorsel – Oostmalle)
- 432 (Oud-Turnhout – Turnhout – Merksplas – Rijkevorsel – Brecht)
- 433 (Turnhout – Beerse – Rijkevorsel – Hoogstraten)
- 434 (Turnhout – Beerse – Merksplas – Hoogstraten)
- 435 (Turnhout industrie – Beerse – Rijkevorsel – Hoogstraten)
- 436 (Turnhout – Retie – Donk – Achterbos – Mol)
- 437 (Turnhout – Retie – Achterbos – Mol via Boeretang)
- 450 (Turnhout – Poppel – Tilburg)
- 451 (Turnhout – Weelde Stenenbrug – Poppel)
- 460 (Turnhout – Baarle-Hertog)
- 480 (Turnhout AZ Sint-Jozef – Arendonk – Reusel)
- 490 (Turnhout – Geel – Westerlo – Herselt – Aarschot)
- 492 (Turnhout – Geel – Westerlo – Blauberg – Herselt – Aarschot)
- 942 (Belbus Turnhout – Oud-Turnhout – Vosselaar – Beerse)

== See also ==
- List of railway stations in Belgium
- Rail transport in Belgium
