= Belgian railway line 15 =

Railway line in Belgium

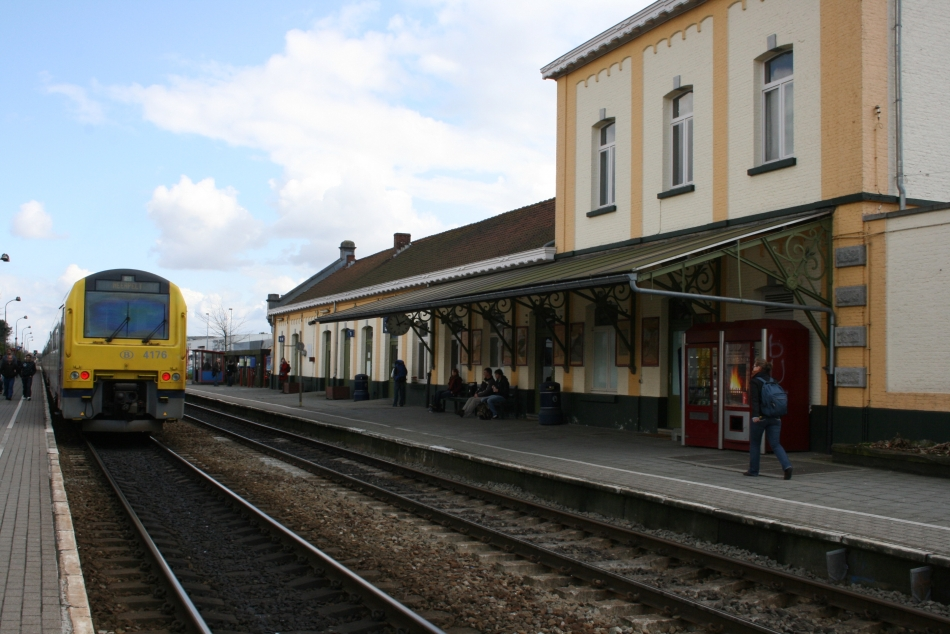
- A train at Geel station in 2009

Overview
- Status: Operational
- Owner: Infrabel
- Locale: Belgium
- Termini: Antwerpen-Berchem railway station; Hasselt railway station

Service
- System: TBL1+
- Operator(s): National Railway Company of Belgium

History
- Opened: 1855-1925

Technical
- Line length: 92 km (57 mi)
- Number of tracks: double track
- Track gauge: 1,435 mm (4 ft 8 1/2 in) standard gauge
- Electrification: 3 kV DC (Antwerp–Mol)
- Operating speed: 120 km/h (75 mph)
Route map
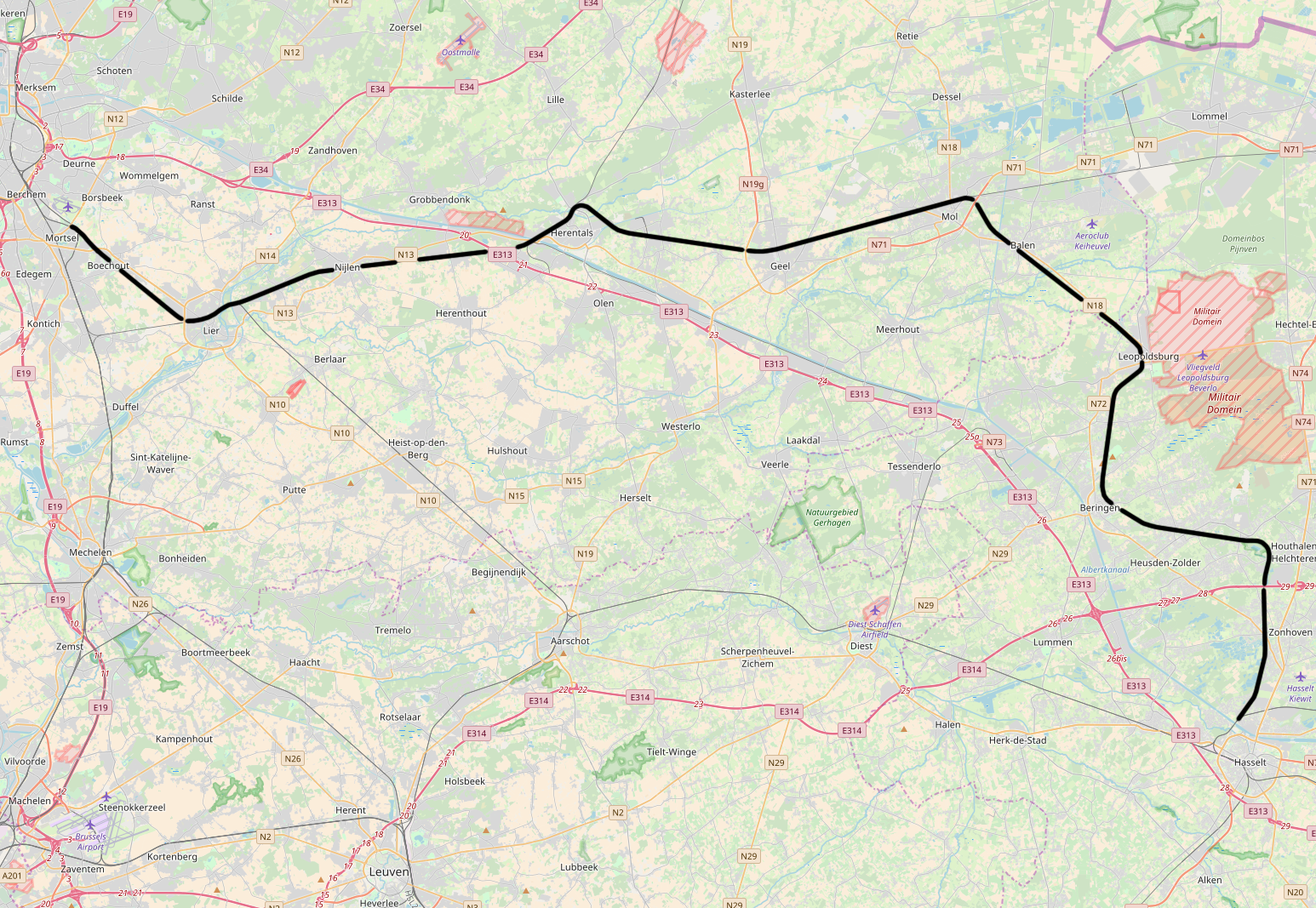

The Belgian railway line 15 is a railway line in Belgium connecting Antwerp with Hasselt. It was opened between 1855 and 1925. The total length of the line between the Drabstraat junction (between Berchem and Mortsel) and the Zonhoven junction (north of Hasselt) is 92.1 km. Line 15 is not the shortest or fastest connection between Antwerp and Hasselt: the faster trains take the 14 km shorter route through Lier, Aarschot and Diest (lines 16 and 35).

== Stations ==
The main interchange stations on line 15 are:

- Antwerpen-Berchem: to Antwerp, Roosendaal, Ghent and Brussels
- Lier: to Mechelen and Aarschot
- Herentals: to Turnhout - Line 29
- Mol: to Neerpelt - Line 19
- Hasselt: to Aarschot, Genk, Landen and Liège
