= Aalter railway station =

Railway station in East Flanders, Belgium

Aalter
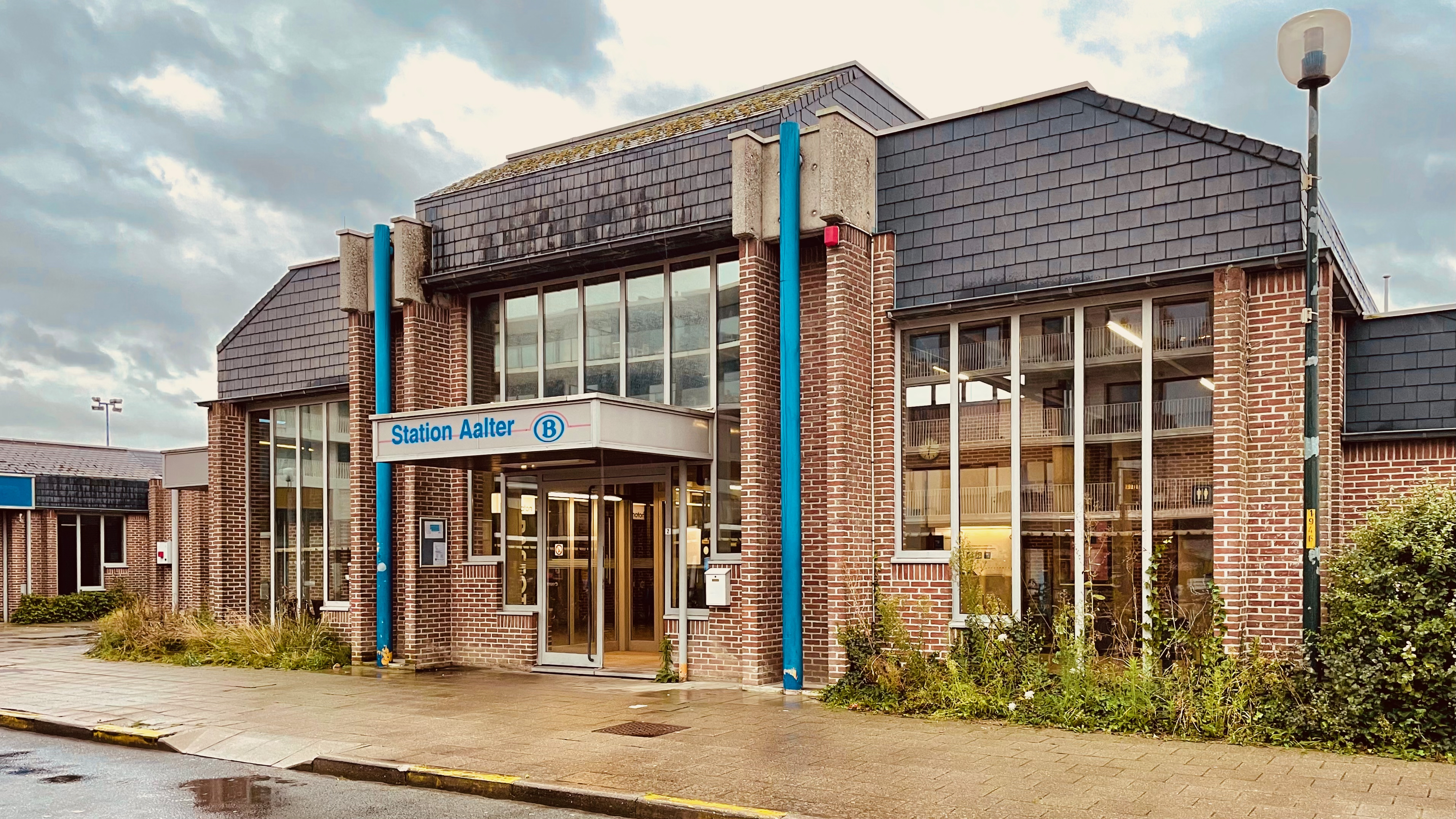
- Aalter railway station

General information
- Location: Stationsplein 2, Aalter
- Coordinates: 51°5′31″N 3°26′55″E
- System: Railway Station
- Owner: National Railway Company of Belgium
- Line: 50A
- Platforms: 2 island platforms
- Tracks: 4

Other information
- Station code: FLT

History
- Opened: 12 August 1838
- Rebuilt: 1984

Passengers
- 2009: 610116
Location
- Location within Belgium

Aalter is a railway station in Aalter, East Flanders, Belgium. The station opened on 12 August 1838 on the Line 50A. The train services are operated by NMBS/SNCB.

The current building was built in 1984 by architect Jacques Devincke.

== Train services ==
The station is served by the following services:

- Intercity services (IC-03) Knokke/Blankenberge - Bruges - Gent - Brussels - Leuven - Genk
- Intercity services (IC-23A) Bruges - Gent - Brussels - Brussels Airport (weekdays)
- Local services (L-02) Zeebrugge - Bruges - Gent - Dendermonde - Mechelen (weekdays)
- Local services (L-02) Zeebrugge - Bruges - Gent (weekends)

Preceding station	NMBS/SNCB	Following station
Brugge towards Blankenberge or Knokke	IC 03	Gent-Sint-Pieters towards Genk
Brugge Terminus	IC 23A	Gent-Sint-Pieters towards Brussels National Airport
Maria-Aalter towards Zeebrugge-Dorp	L 02 weekdays	Bellem towards Mechelen
Maria-Aalter towards Zeebrugge-Strand	L 02 weekends	Bellem towards Gent-Sint-Pieters
