= Kiewit railway station =

Railway station in Limburg, Belgium

Kiewit
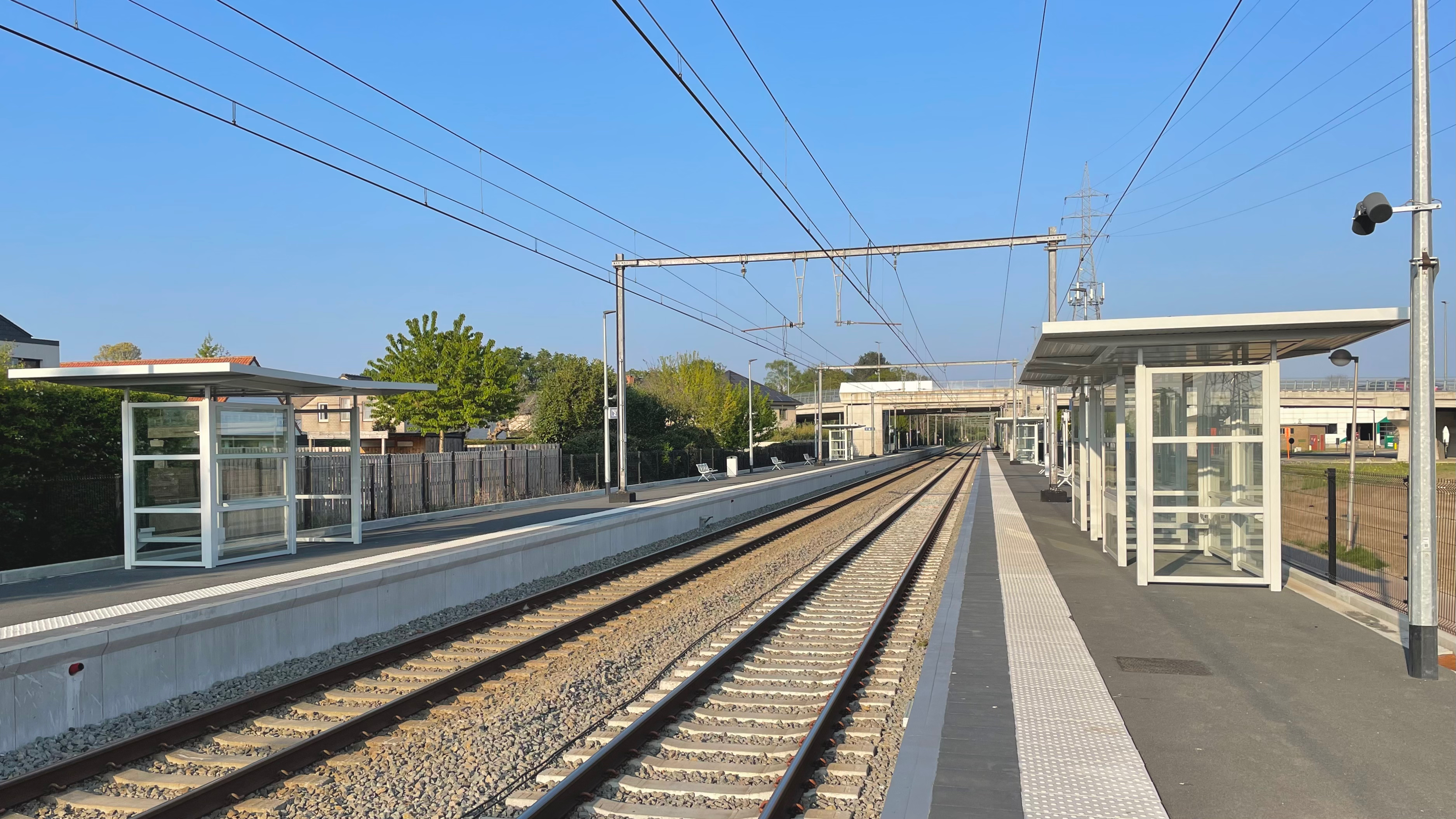
- Kiewit railway station

General information
- Location: Kiewit, Limburg; Belgium
- Coordinates: 50°57′16″N 5°21′01″E
- System: Railway Station
- Owner: Infrabel
- Operator: National Railway Company of Belgium
- Line: 21A
- Platforms: 2

History
- Opened: 28 May 1972; 54 years ago reopened 28 May 1989; 37 years ago
- Closed: 3 June 1984; 42 years ago

Passengers
- 2014: 635 per day
Location

Kiewit is a railway station in Kiewit, close to the city of Hasselt, Limburg, Belgium. The station opened on 28 May 1974 and is located on line 21A. The station was closed on 3 June 1984 and reopened on 28 May 1989. The train services are operated by National Railway Company of Belgium (NMBS).

The station was opened close to the location of the Philips factory in an attempt to reduce the congestion caused by people travelling to work at the factory by car. The station is also used by students travelling to nearby schools and people travelling to the Pukkelpop music festival.

== Train services ==
The station is served by the following services:

- Intercity services (IC-03) Blankeberge/Knokke - Bruges - Ghent - Brussels - Leuven - Hasselt - Genk

Preceding station	NMBS/SNCB	Following station
Hasselt towards Blankenberge or Knokke	IC 03	Bokrijk towards Genk

== See also ==
- List of railway stations in Belgium
