= Heist railway station =

Railway station in West Flanders, Belgium

Heist
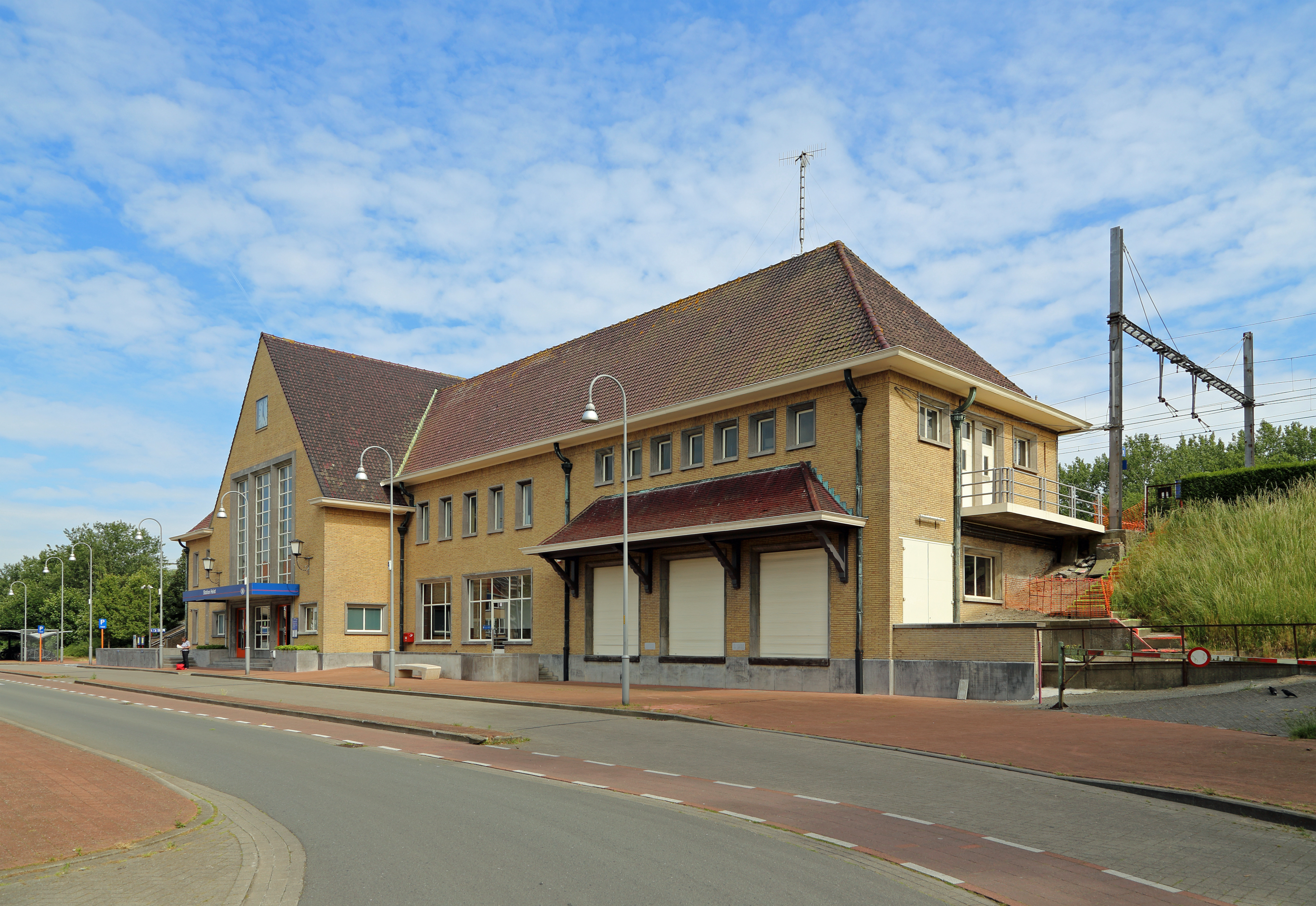
- Heist railway station

General information
- Location: Knokke-Heist, West Flanders; Belgium
- Coordinates: 51°20′03″N 3°14′25″E
- System: Railway Station
- Owner: Infrabel
- Operator: National Railway Company of Belgium
- Line: 51B
- Platforms: 2

Other information
- Station code: FHI

History
- Opened: 22 July 1868; 158 years ago

Passengers
- 2014: 431 per day

Services
Preceding station	NMBS/SNCB	Following station
Duinbergen towards Knokke	IC 03	Brugge towards Genk
Location

Heist is a railway station in the town of Knokke-Heist, West Flanders, Belgium. The station opened on 29 June 1920 and is located on line 51B. The train services are operated by National Railway Company of Belgium (NMBS).

== Train services ==
The station is served by the following services:

- Intercity services (IC-03) Knokke - Bruges - Ghent - Brussels - Leuven - Hasselt - Genk

== See also ==
- List of railway stations in Belgium
