= FKY =

FKY may refer to:

- Bokrijk railway station (station code), a railway station in Limburg, Belgium
- Yogyakarta Art Festival, an annual arts festivals held in Yogyakarta, Indonesia
