= Bokrijk railway station =

Railway station in Limburg, Belgium

Bokrijk
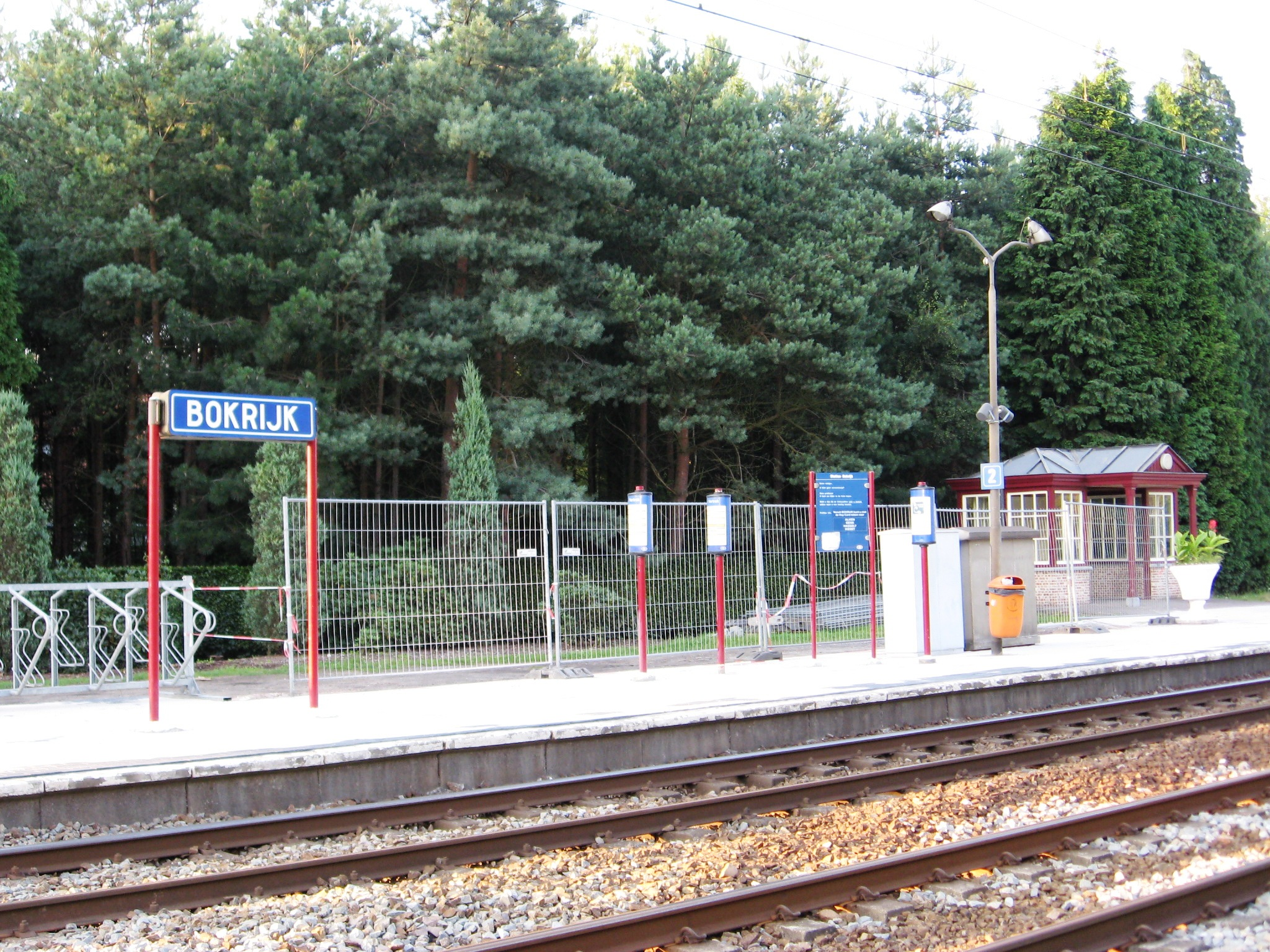
- Bokrijk railway station

General information
- Location: Bokrijk, Limburg; Belgium
- Coordinates: 50°57′20″N 5°24′31″E
- System: Railway Station
- Owner: Infrabel
- Operator: National Railway Company of Belgium
- Line: 21A
- Platforms: 2

Other information
- Station code: FKY

History
- Opened: 3 March 1874; 152 years ago reopened 26 May 1979; 47 years ago
- Closed: 2 October 1949; 76 years ago

Passengers
- 2014: 108 per day
Location

Bokrijk is a railway station in the Bokrijk area close to the town of Genk, Limburg, Belgium. The station opened on 3 March 1874 and is located on line 21A. The station was closed on 2 October 1949 and reopened on 26 May 1979. The train services are operated by National Railway Company of Belgium (NMBS).

== Train services ==
The station is served by the following services:

- Intercity services (IC-03) Blankeberge/Knokke - Bruges - Ghent - Brussels - Leuven - Hasselt - Genk

Preceding station	NMBS/SNCB	Following station
Kiewit towards Blankenberge or Knokke	IC 03	Genk Terminus

== See also ==
- List of railway stations in Belgium
