= Brugge railway station =

Railway station in West Flanders, Belgium

Brugge
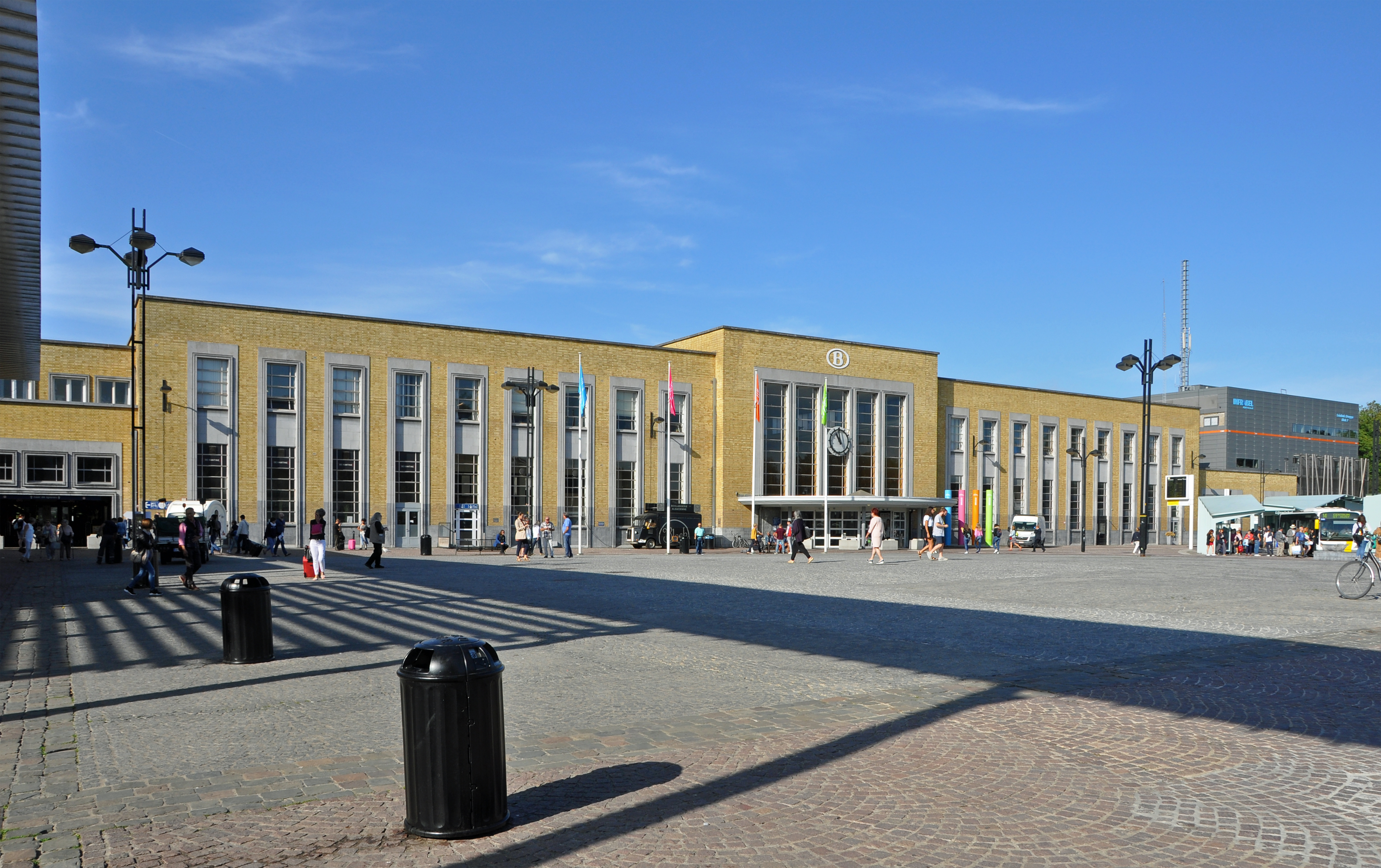
- Brugge railway station

General information
- Location: Stationsplein, 8000 Bruges; Belgium
- Coordinates: 51°11′50″N 3°13′2″E
- System: Railway Station
- Owner: NMBS/SNCB
- Operator: NMBS/SNCB
- Lines: 50A (Brussels-Ostend); 51 (Bruges-Blankenberge); 66 (Bruges-Kortrijk)
- Platforms: 5 island platforms
- Tracks: 12 (1 head track)

Other information
- Station code: FR

History
- Opened: 12 August 1838; 188 years ago

Passengers
- 2014: 18,122 per day
Location
- Location within Belgium Location within Europe

Brugge railway station (Dutch: Station Brugge; French: Gare de Bruges) (Note: Officially Brugge (Dutch: Brugge; French: Bruges)) is the main railway station in Bruges, West Flanders, Belgium. The first station opened on 12 August 1838 on railway lines 50A, 51, and 66. The current building has been in use since 1939. The station is one of the busiest in Belgium. The train services are operated by the National Railway Company of Belgium (NMBS/SNCB).

== History ==
The railway arrived in Bruges in 1838 when the Ghent to Bruges railway was opened, with King Leopold I and Queen Louise-Marie. The line was closer to the city centre than it is today, passing through the large square 't Zand within the medieval walls. A couple of weeks later the Bruges to Ostend railway was opened. In the first 6 years of its existence there was no station building, this opened on 't Zand in 1844, designed by Auguste Payen. The railway to Kortrijk opened in 1846–1857 and lines to Eeklo and Blankenberge in 1863. The result of the success of the railways was that the station was too small. In 1879 the building was demolished and reconstructed at Ronse, where it still stands today. After completion in Ronse, it became apparent that the building had been accidentally rebuilt backwards, causing the front to face to tracks instead of the street. A new station building was completed in 1886, designed by Joseph Schadde.

Work started on the present-day railway alignment outside the city walls in 1910, but it was abandoned during the First World War and not completed until 1936. The current station building, designed in the International Style by the brothers Josse and Maurice Van Kriekinge, opened in 1938. The 1886 station remained, derelict, on 't Zand throughout the Second World War, before its eventual demolition in 1948.

The station was served by a daily Thalys high-speed rail service to Paris between 1998 and 31 March 2015.

== Modernisation ==
In 2007, the station was the 10th busiest station in Belgium and there was a large increase in passengers expected over the coming years. In 2004, a modernisation and expansion of the station started. The tunnel under the platforms was expanded by 12 metres, allowing more space for passengers and small shops. Access to the platforms was improved with new stairs, escalators and lifts. The works were completed in May 2009. Behind the station, an underground car park for 800 cars and 1000 bikes was completed in 2010.

== Train services ==
The station is served by the following services:

- Intercity services (IC-01) Ostend - Bruges - Ghent - Brussels - Leuven - Liege - Eupen
- Intercity services (IC-02) Ostend - Bruges - Ghent - Sint-Niklaas - Antwerpen
- Intercity services (IC-03) Knokke/Blankenberge - Bruges - Ghent - Brussels - Leuven - Genk
- Intercity services (IC-23) Ostend - Bruges - Kortrijk - Zottegem - Brussels - Brussels Airport
- Intercity services (IC-23A) Bruges - Ghent - Brussels - Brussels Airport (weekdays)
- Intercity services (IC-32) Bruges - Roeselare - Kortrijk
- Local services (L-02) Zeebrugge - Bruges – Ghent – Dendermonde – Mechelen (weekdays)
- Local services (L-02) Zeebrugge - Bruges – Ghent (weekends)

Preceding station	NMBS/SNCB	Following station
Oostende Terminus	IC 01	Gent-Sint-Pieters towards Eupen
Oostende Terminus	IC 02	Gent-Sint-Pieters towards Antwerpen-Centraal
Blankenberge Terminus	IC 03	Aalter towards Genk
Heist towards Knokke	IC 03	Aalter towards Genk
Oostende Terminus	IC 23	Zedelgem towards Brussels National Airport
Terminus	IC 23A	Aalter towards Brussels National Airport
Terminus	IC 32	Zedelgem towards Kortrijk
Brugge-Sint-Pieters towards Zeebrugge-Dorp	L 02 weekdays	Oostkamp towards Mechelen
Brugge-Sint-Pieters towards Zeebrugge-Strand	L 02 weekends	Oostkamp towards Gent-Sint-Pieters

== Gallery ==
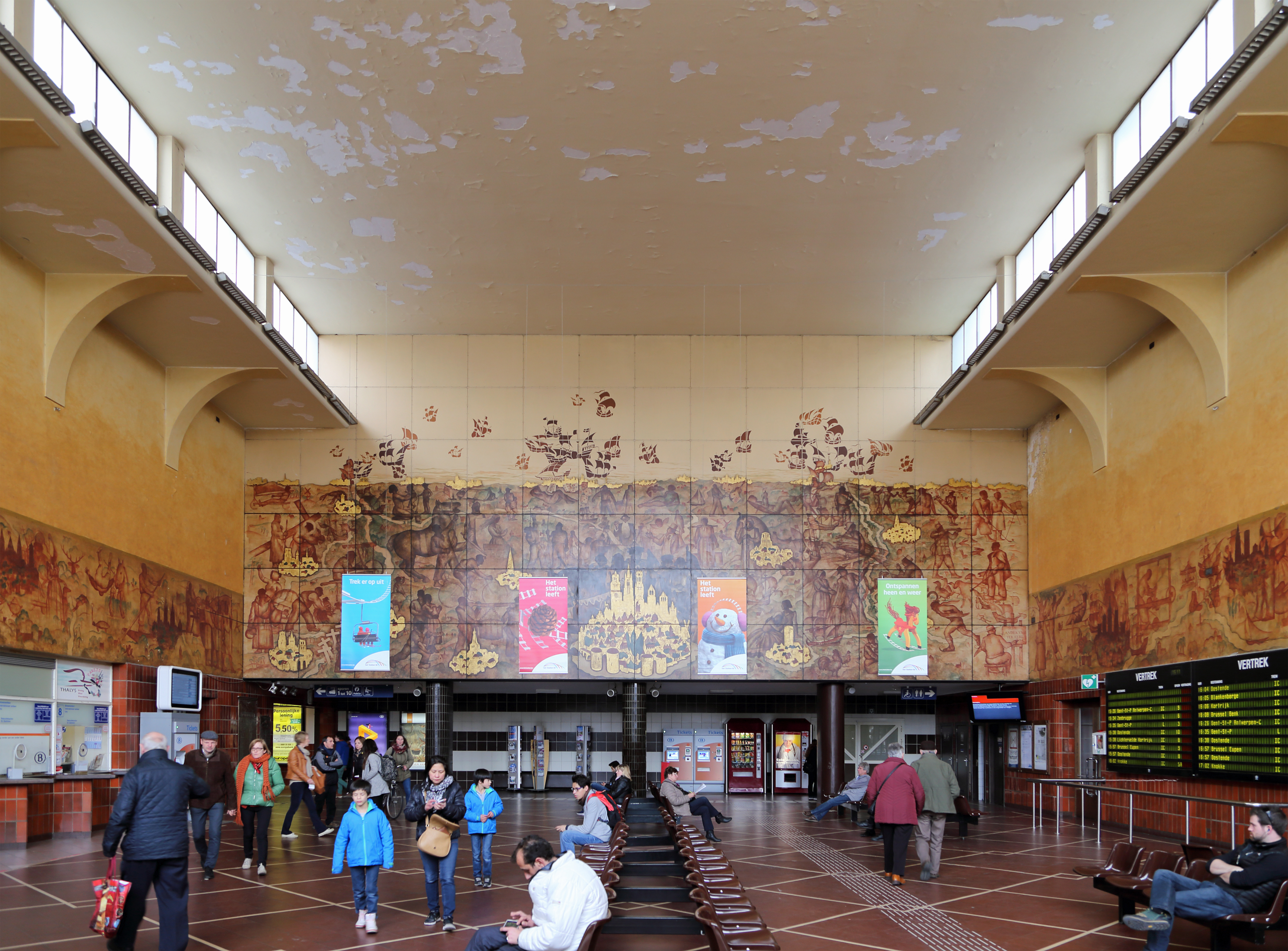
Interior of the station

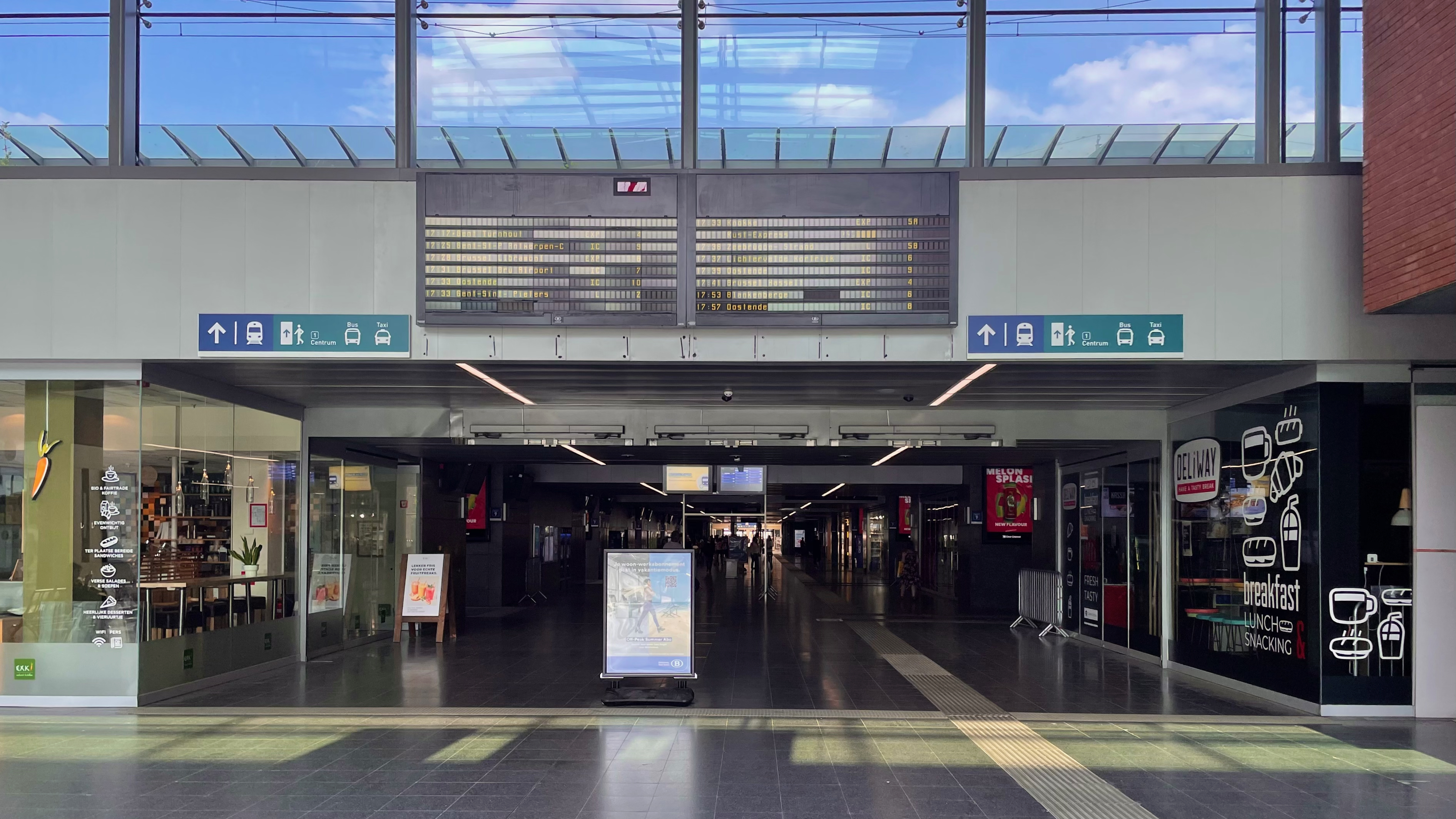
Passage under the tracks

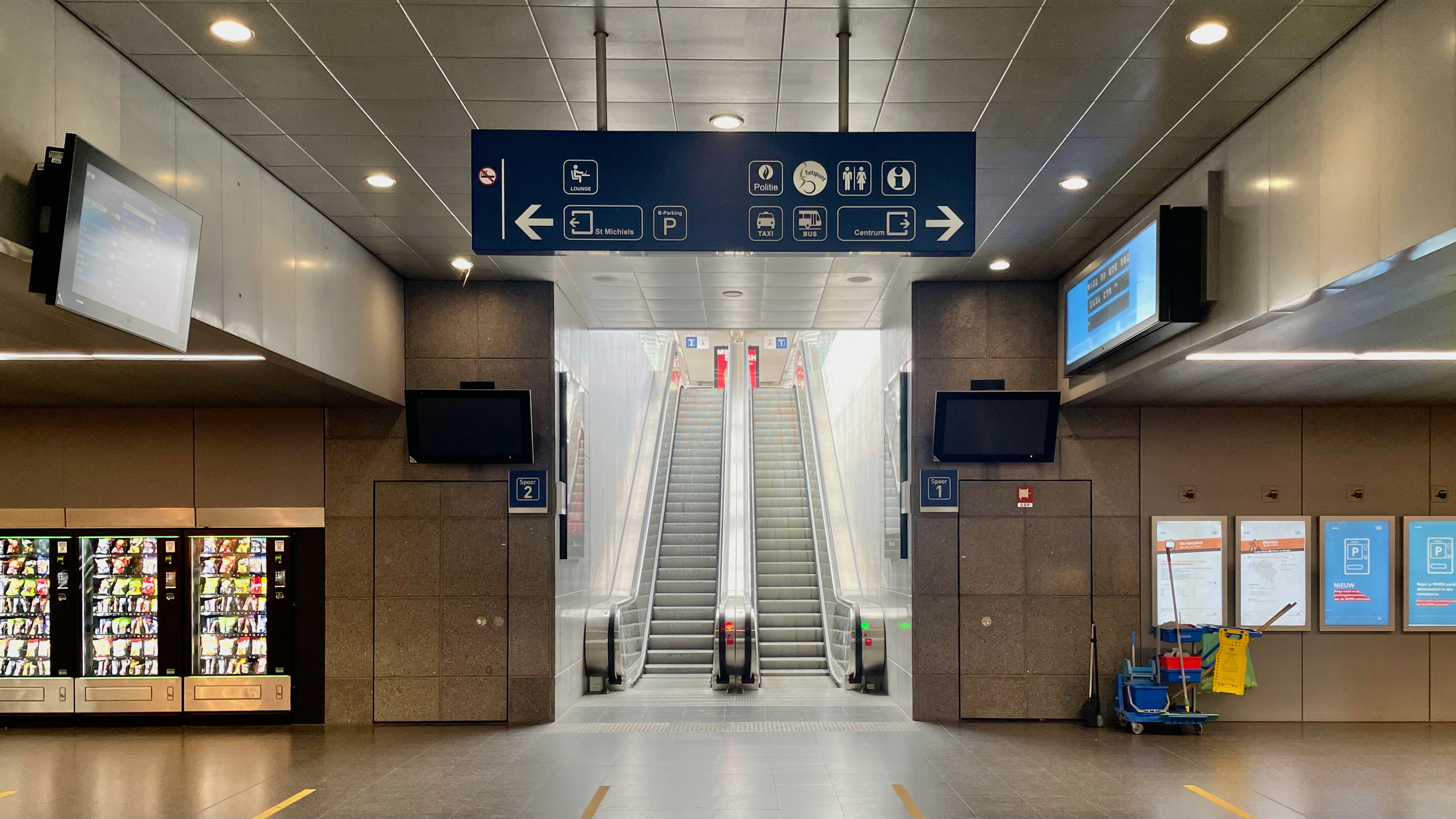
Escalator to the platforms

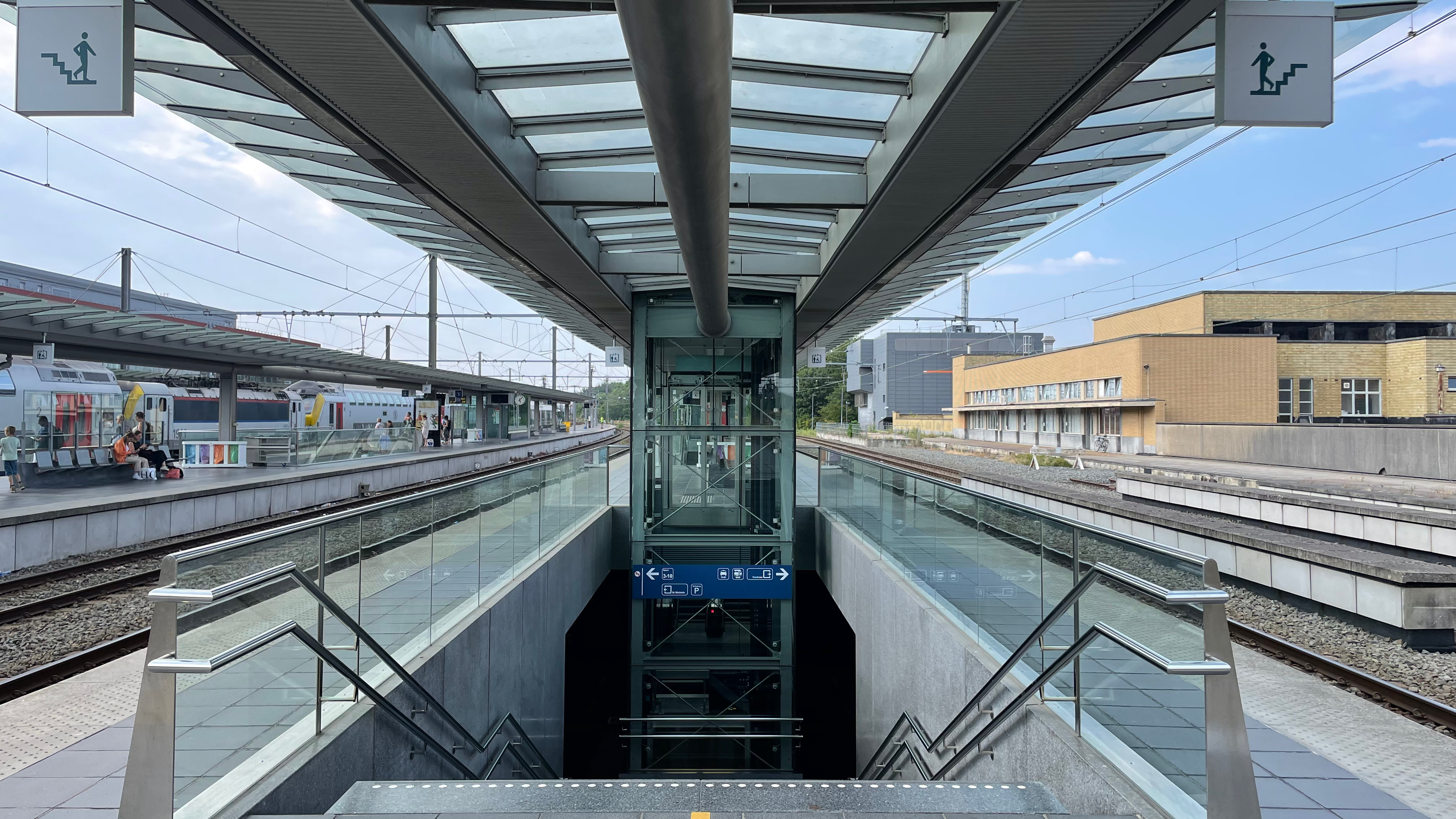
View of the platforms

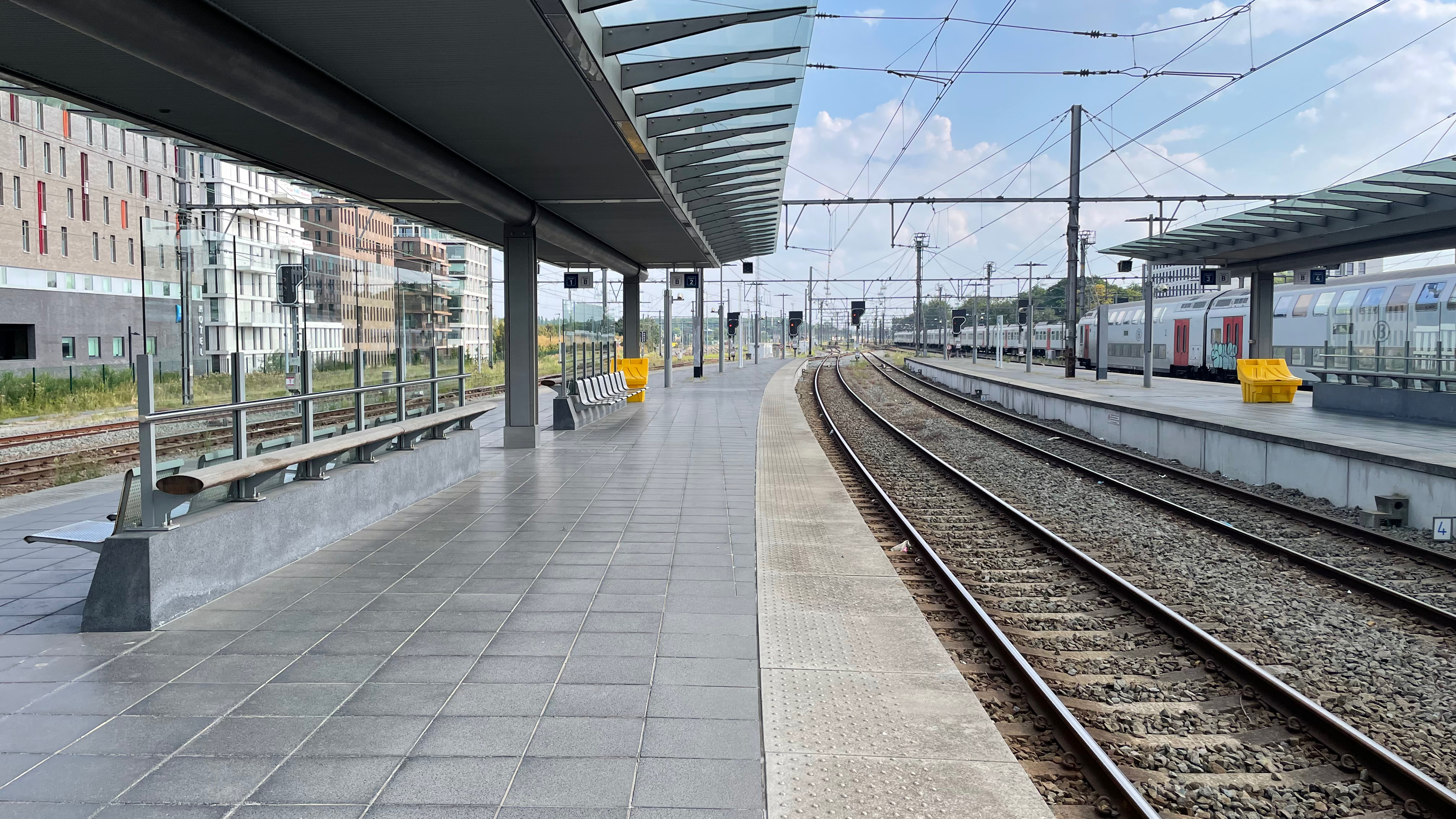
View of the platforms and tracks

== See also ==
- List of railway stations in Belgium
- Rail transport in Belgium
