= Yogyakarta Art Festival =

Annual arts festivals held in Yogyakarta, Indonesia

Yogyakarta Art Festival (Indonesian: Festival Kesenian Yogyakarta / FKY) is an annual arts festivals held in Yogyakarta, Indonesia. FKY was established on July 7, 1989. Previously, all 24 festivals were held near Fort Vredeburg. Since 2013, FKY has relocated to the Ngasem Market complex.
