= Blankenberge railway station =

Railway station in West Flanders, Belgium

Blankenberge
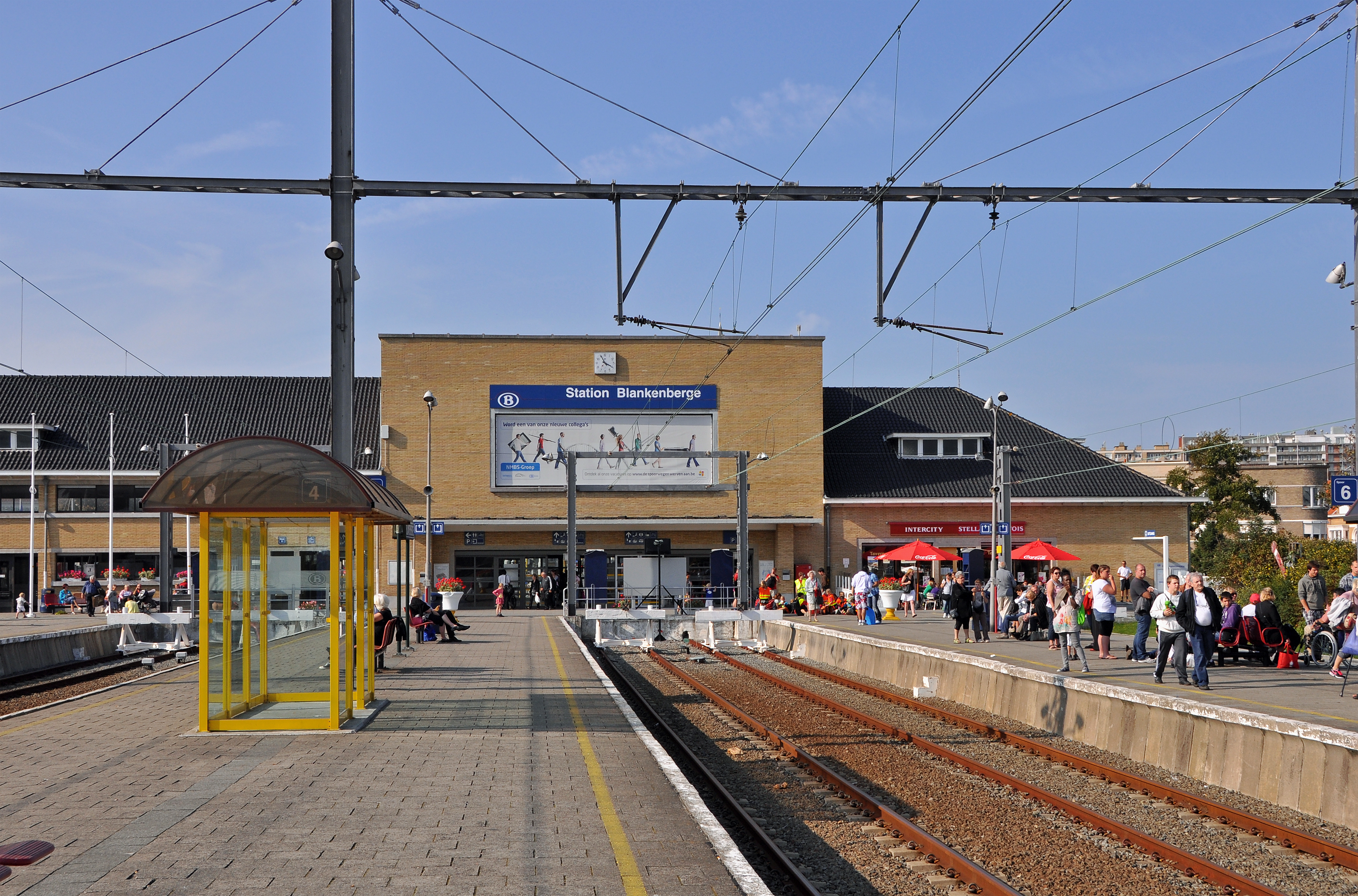
- Blankenberge railway station

General information
- Location: Blankenberge, West Flanders; Belgium
- Coordinates: 51°18′44″N 3°08′00″E
- System: Railway Station
- Owner: NMBS/SNCB
- Operator: NMBS/SNCB
- Lines: 51, Kusttram
- Platforms: 7 NMBS
- Tracks: 7 NMBS

History
- Opened: 16 August 1863; 163 years ago
- Electrified: 3 kV DC overhead on NMBS and 600 V DC overhead on the Kusttram
Location
- Location within Belgium Location within Europe

Blankenberge railway station (Dutch: Station Blankenberge; French: Gare de Blankenberghe) (Note: Officially Blankenberge (Dutch: Blankenberge; French: Blankenberghe)) is a railway station in Blankenberge, West Flanders, Belgium. The station opened on 16 August 1863 on railway line 51. It is run by the National Railway Company of Belgium (NMBS/SNCB) as a terminal station located on the railway line from Brugge and has services to Brussels-South and beyond to Leuven.

== History ==
The railway from Bruges to Blankenberge was first used on Sunday 26 July 1863. The construction of the line took less than a year and the materials for the construction were delivered by ship to Bruges along the Oostendse Vaart canal. At 12 o'clock on that day the first train, formed of 3 or 4 carriages left for Blankenberge, arriving there about 45 minutes later. From 16 August the railway opened to passenger service. On 12 July 1868 the extension to Heist was put into use. This decreased the travel time slightly, as it was estimated to be approximately 30 minutes in 1869.

Since 1890 the Kusttram has served the station and connected the town with Heist and Knokke to the north and Ostend and De Panne to the south. Between Blankenberge and Heist, the railway and tramline ran parallel.

On 1 October 1908 Blankenberge became a terminus when the section to Zeebrugge was closed to allow for the expansion of the port of Zeebrugge. A new railway line was built between Bruges and Zeebrugge, which joined with the line to Heist.

== Train services ==
The station is served by the following service(s):

- Intercity services (IC-03) Blankenberge - Bruges - Ghent - Brussels - Leuven - Genk

Preceding station	NMBS/SNCB	Following station
Terminus	IC 03	Brugge towards Genk
Preceding station	Coast Tram	Following station
Blankenberge Markt towards De Panne		Blankenberge Pier towards Knokke

== Tram services ==
The Kusttram station is located outside the station with trams westbound to Oostende and beyond, and eastbound to Knokke railway station, these are operated by De Lijn.

== Bus services ==
Bus services 33, 38 serve the station, these are operated by De Lijn.

== See also ==
- List of railway stations in Belgium
- Rail transport in Belgium
