= Knokke railway station =

Railway station in West Flanders, Belgium

Knokke
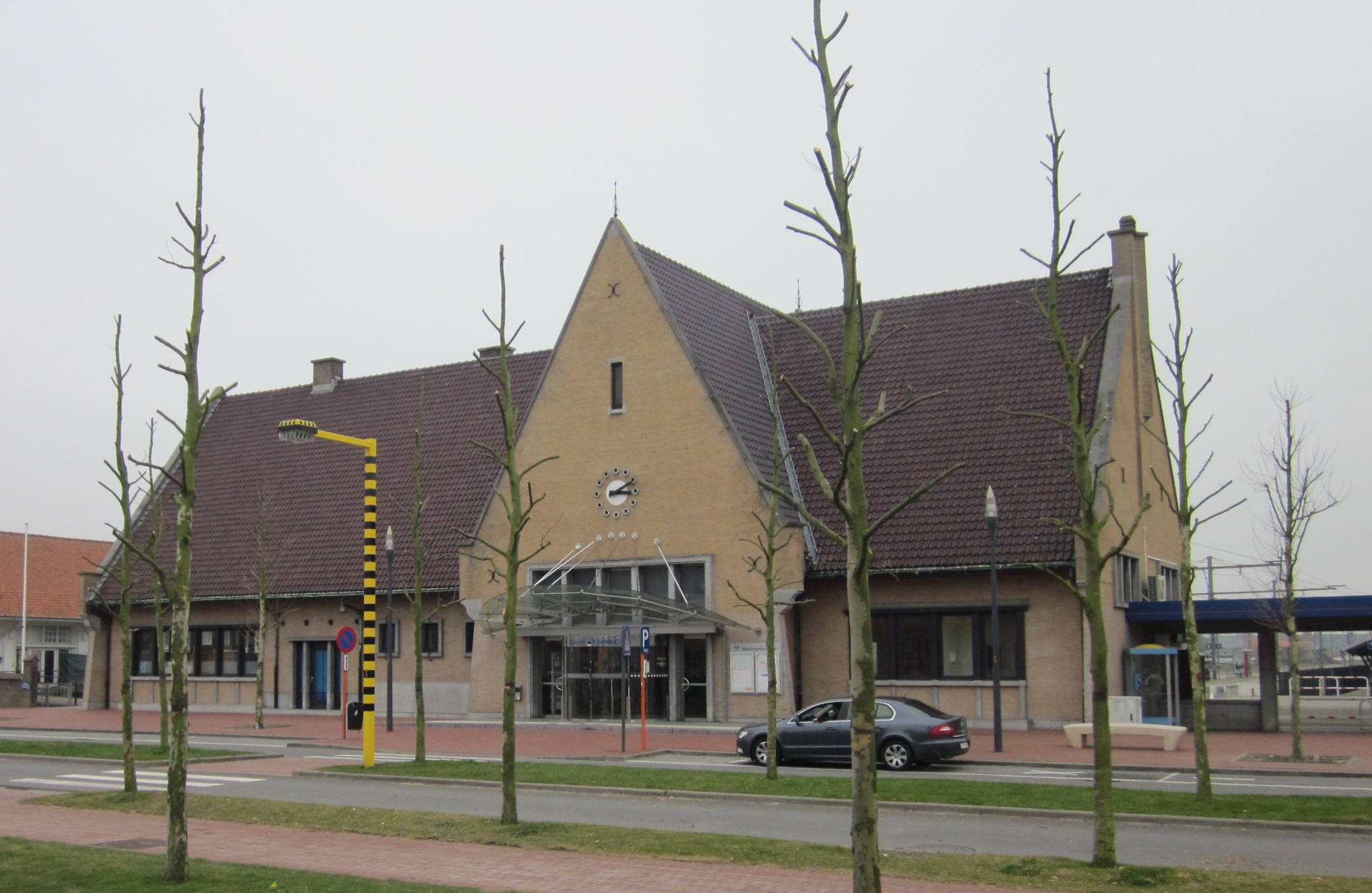
- Knokke railway station

General information
- Location: Knokke, West Flanders; Belgium
- Coordinates: 51°20′23″N 3°17′05″E
- System: Railway Station
- Owner: NMBS/SNCB
- Operator: NMBS/SNCB
- Lines: 51B, Kusttram
- Platforms: 3 NMBS
- Tracks: 3 NMBS

History
- Opened: 1920
- Electrified: 3 kV DC overhead on NMBS and 600 V DC overhead on the Kusttram
Location
- Location within Belgium Location within Europe

Knokke railway station (Dutch: Station Knokke; French: Gare de Knokke) (Note: Officially Knokke) is a railway station serving Knokke-Heist and Knokke, in West Flanders, Belgium. The station was built in 1920. It is run by the National Railway Company of Belgium (NMBS/SNCB) as a terminal station located on the railway line 51B from Brugge and has services to Brussels-South and beyond to Tongeren. The Kusttram terminus is located outside the station with trams to Oostende and beyond.

== Train services ==
The station is served by the following services:

- Intercity services (IC-03) Knokke - Bruges - Ghent - Brussels - Leuven - Genk

Preceding station	NMBS/SNCB	Following station
Terminus	IC 03	Duinbergen towards Genk
Preceding station	Coast Tram	Following station
Duinbergen Watertoren towards De Panne		Terminus

== Gallery ==
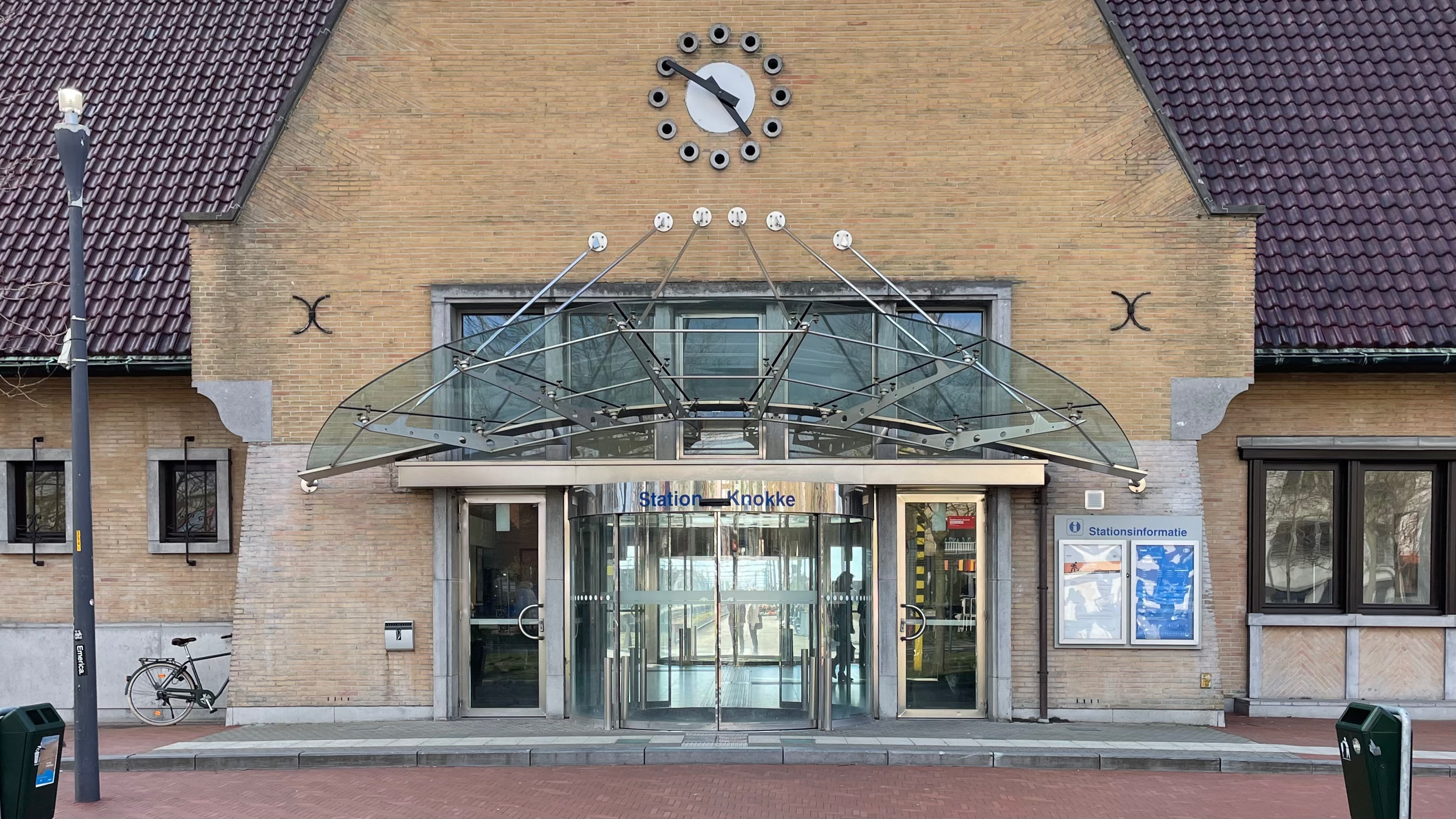
Entrance

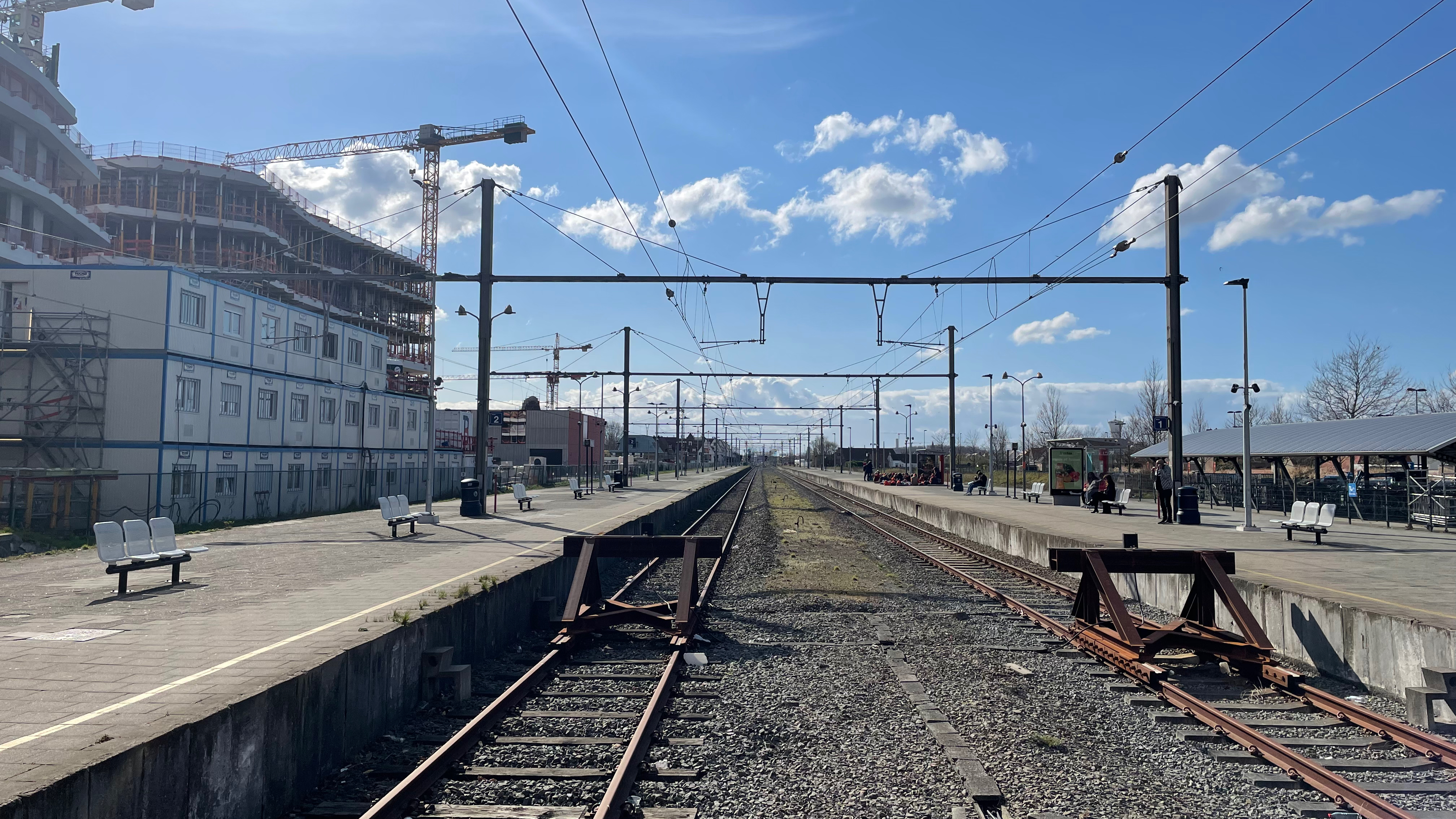
View of the platforms and tracks

== See also ==
- List of railway stations in Belgium
- Rail transport in Belgium
