= Genk railway station =

Railway station in Limburg, Belgium

Genk
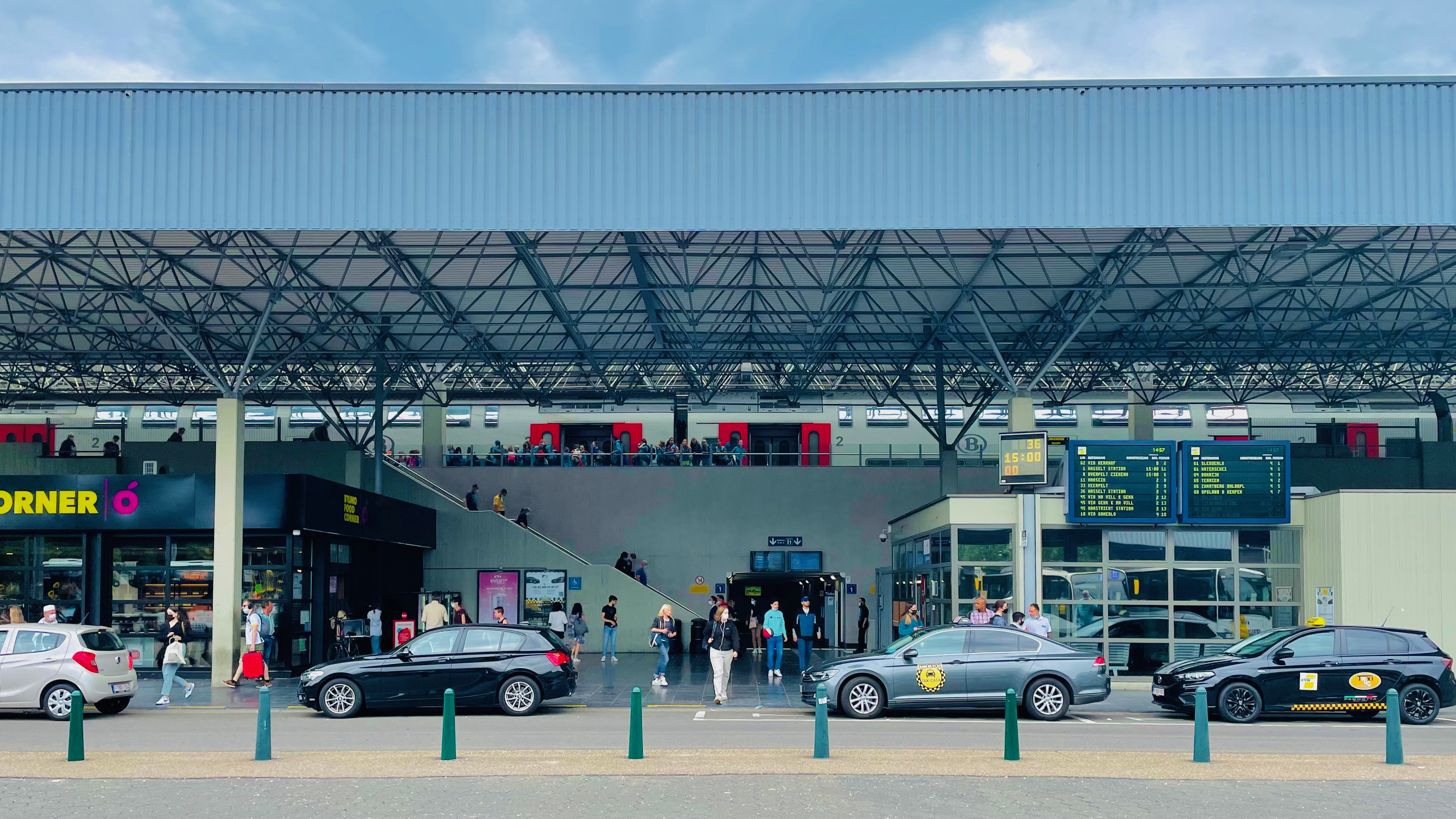
- Genk railway station

General information
- Location: Genk, Limburg; Belgium
- Coordinates: 50°58′01″N 5°29′47″E
- System: Railway Station
- Owner: NMBS/SNCB
- Operator: NMBS/SNCB
- Line: 21D
- Platforms: 3

Other information
- Station code: FKG

History
- Opened: 3 March 1874; 152 years ago
- Closed: 6 October 1941; 84 years ago
- Rebuilt: 26 May 1979; 47 years ago

Passengers
- 2014: 1,081 per day
Location
- Location within Belgium Location within Europe

Genk railway station (Dutch: Station Genk; French: Gare de Genk) (Note: Officially Genk) is a railway station in Genk, Limburg, Belgium. The station opened on 3 March 1874 and is located on railway line 21D. The station was closed on 6 October 1941 and reopened on 26 May 1979. The train services are operated by the National Railway Company of Belgium (NMBS/SNCB).

== Train services ==
The station is served by the following services:

- Intercity services (IC-03) Blankeberge/Knokke - Bruges - Ghent - Brussels - Leuven - Hasselt - Genk

Preceding station	NMBS/SNCB	Following station
Bokrijk towards Blankenberge or Knokke	IC 03	Terminus

- These are complemented by a few peak-hour trains to Hasselt, and beyond to Brussels, departing in the early morning and returning in late afternoon.

== Gallery ==
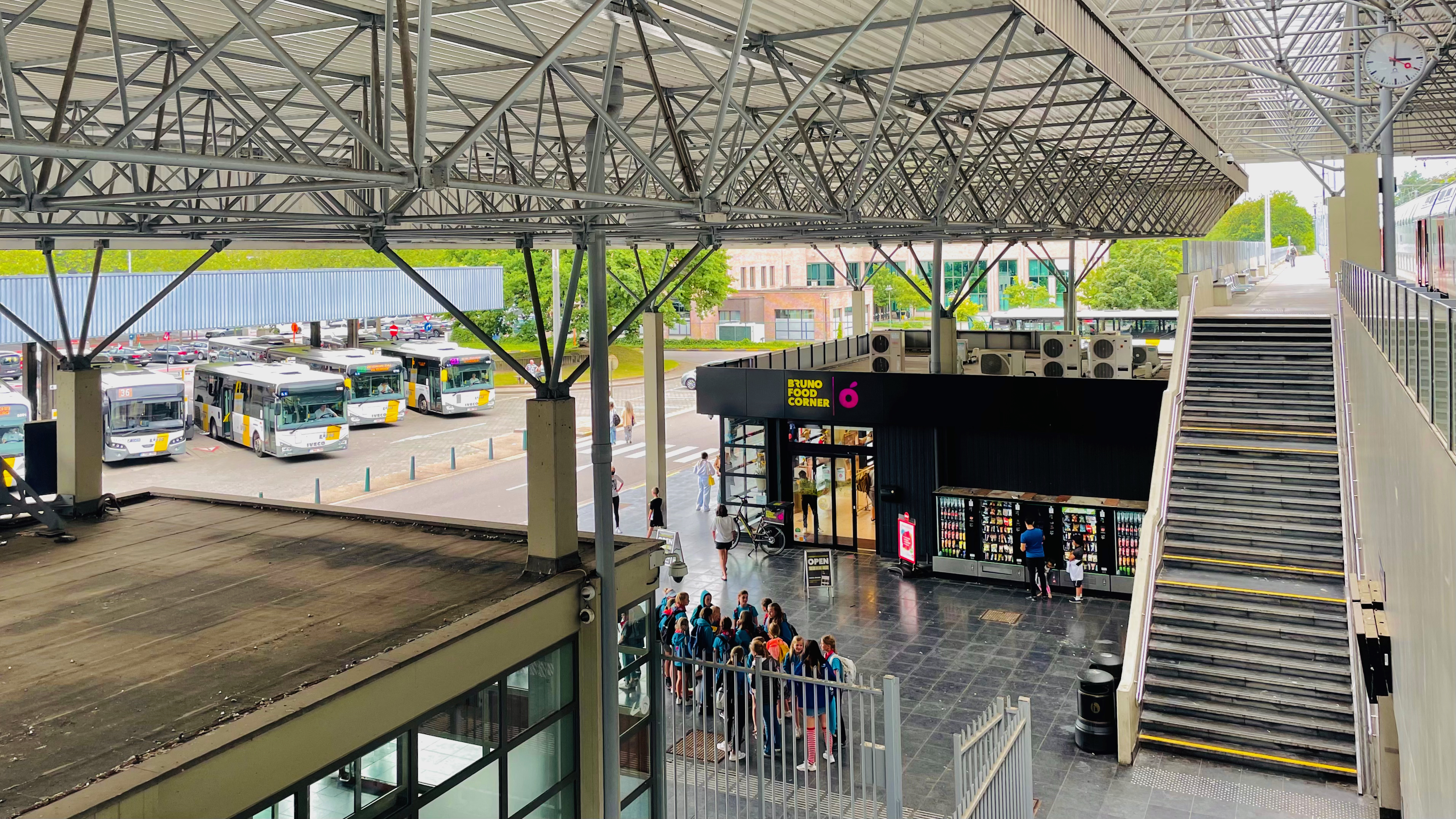
Entrance

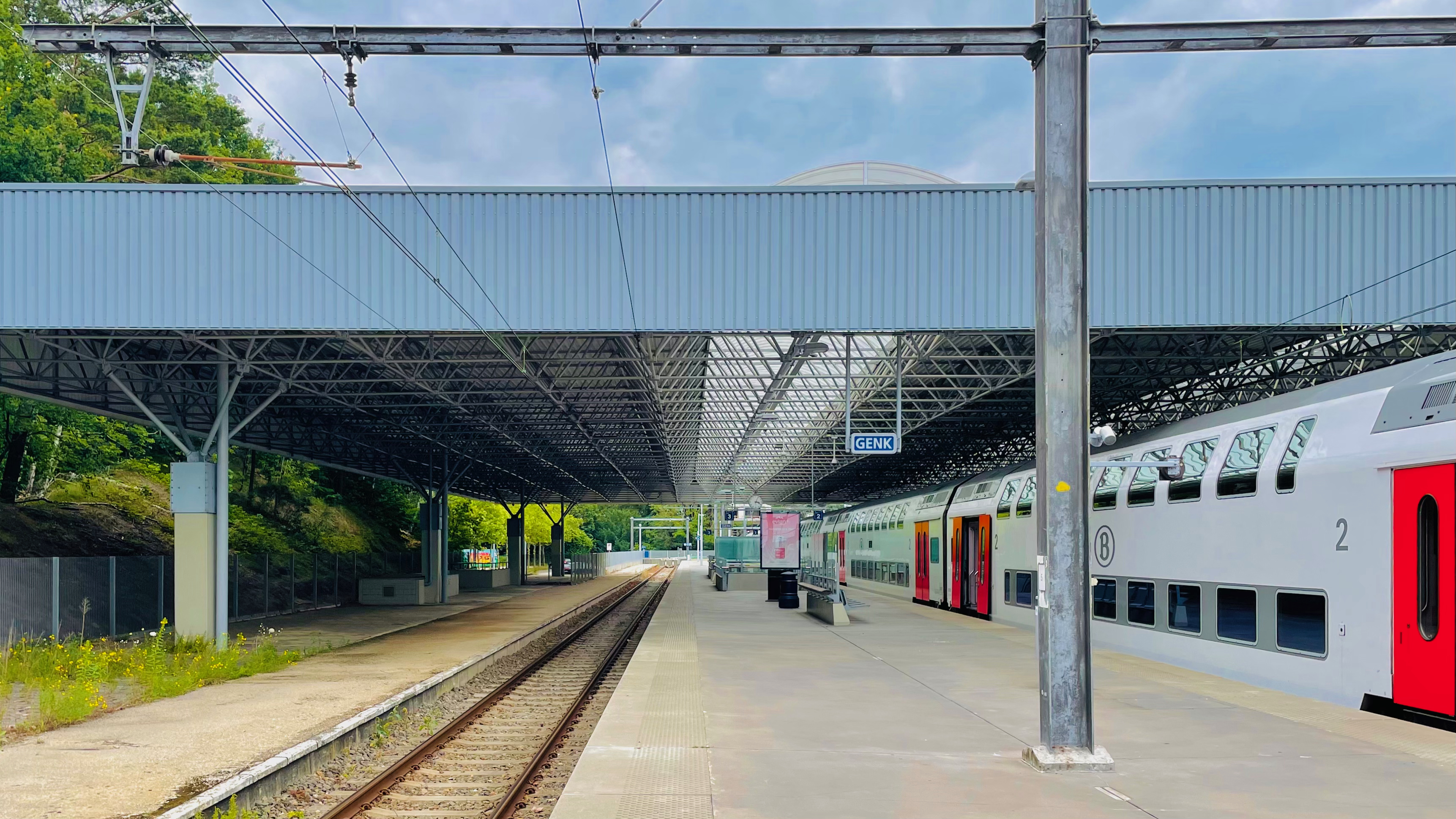
View of the platforms

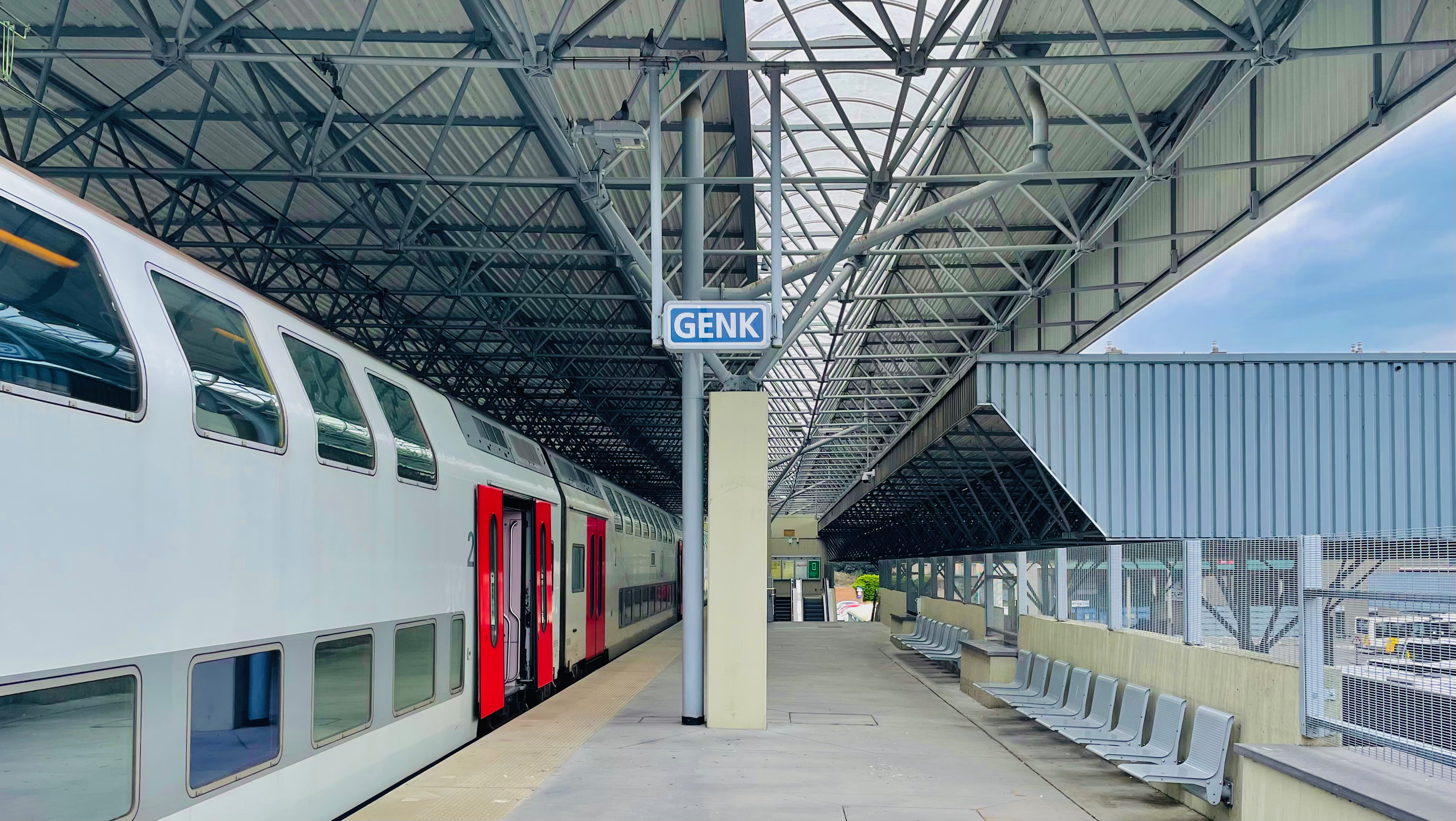
Place name sign on a platform

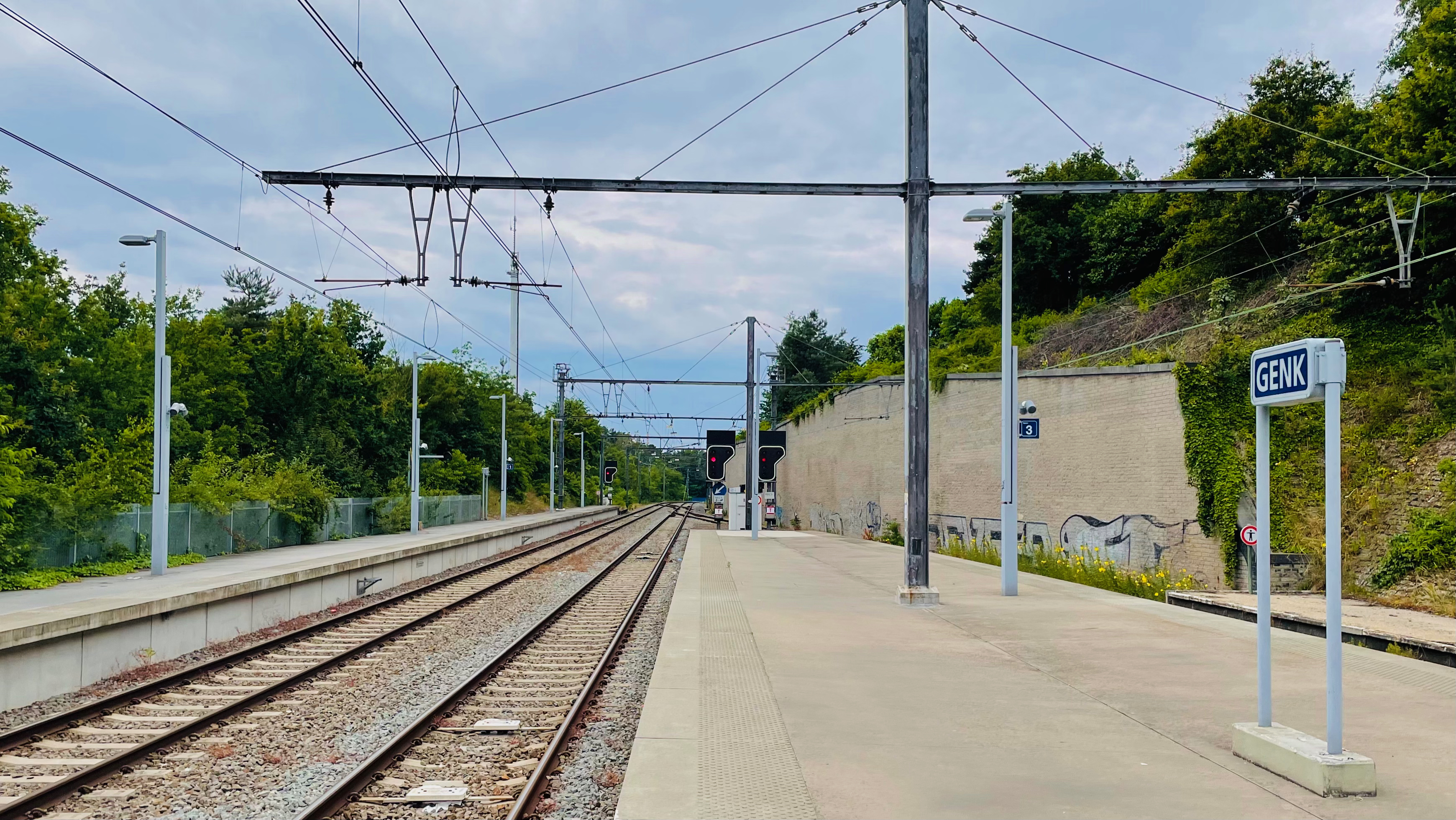
View of the platforms and tracks

== See also ==
- List of railway stations in Belgium
- Rail transport in Belgium
