= National Railway Company of Belgium =

Western European state-owned transportation provider

- Trade name: NMBS/SNCB
- Native name: Dutch: Nationale Maatschappij der Belgische Spoorwegen; French: Société nationale des chemins de fer belges German: Nationale Gesellschaft der Belgischen Eisenbahnen
- Type: Statutory corporation
- Industry: Rail transportation
- Founded: 1926
- Founder: Government of Belgium
- Headquarters: Avenue de la Porte de Hal/Hallepoortlaan 40, 1060 Brussels, Belgium
- Revenue: ▲€2.72 billion (2023)
- Net income: ▲€67.1 million (2023)
- Number of employees: 16 864 (2023)
- Subsidiaries: BeNe Rail; Eurogare (defunct); Train World; SNCB YPTO
- Website: belgiantrain.be

The National Railway Company of Belgium (Dutch: Nationale Maatschappij der Belgische Spoorwegen, NMBS; (Note: Flemish pronunciation: [nɑsjoːˈnaːlə ˌmaːtsxɑˈpɛi dɛr ˈbɛlɣisə ˈspoːrˌʋeːɣən] and [ɛnɛmbeːˈʔɛs].) French: Société nationale des chemins de fer belges, SNCB; (Note: French pronunciation: [sɔsjete nɑsjɔnal de ʃ(ə)mɛ̃ də fɛʁ bɛlʒ] and [ɛsɛnsebe].) German: Nationale Gesellschaft der Belgischen Eisenbahnen) (Note: German pronunciation: [ˌnatsi̯oˈnaːlə ɡəˈzɛlʃaft deːɐ̯ ˈbɛlɡɪʃn̩ ˈaɪ̯zn̩ˌbaːnən].) is the national railway company of Belgium. The company formally styles itself using the Dutch and French abbreviations NMBS/SNCB. The corporate logo designed in 1936 by Henry van de Velde consists of the linguistically neutral letter B in a horizontal oval.

== History ==
NMBS/SNCB is an autonomous government company, formed in 1926 as successor to the Belgian State Railways. In 1935, the country and its system embarked on the process of electrification (changing a system to run on electricity). In the present, only a few of its lines run on diesel. From 1942 to 1944, amid Nazi Germany's occupation of Belgium, the company was paid 51 million Belgian francs by the Nazi Germany to send 28 trains carrying 25,843 Jews and Roma people to Auschwitz where only 1,195 survived. The company also sent 16,000 political prisoners to concentration camps.

The company's logo was designed by Antwerp-born Art Nouveau pioneer Henry van de Velde, who served as SNCB's artistic advisor from 1932 to 1939. He sought to improve the use of materials without compromising comfort and aesthetics. He also provided expert advice on issue from design of rolling stock to the introduction of electrification in 1935.

In 1980, SNCB merged with SNCV, the national bus and light rail company.

In 2005, the company was split up into three parts: Infrabel, which manages the railway infrastructure, network operations, and network access, the public railway operator NMBS/SNCB itself to manage the freight (B-Cargo) and passenger services, and NMBS/SNCB-Holding, which owns both public companies and supervises the collaboration between them. Essentially, this was a move to facilitate future liberalisation of railway freight and passenger services in agreement with European regulations. Several freight operators have since received access permissions for the Belgian network. In February 2011, NMBS/SNCB Logistics began operating as a separate business.

Faced with rising losses, in June 2012, the Belgian transport minister announced further reform: NMBS/SNCB Holding would be split up, so NMBS/SNCB (the train operator) would be separate from Infrabel (the infrastructure owner). Unions opposed the reform.

NMBS/SNCB-Holding was merged into NMBS/SNCB in 2014 in order to simplify the structure of the Belgian railways.

NMBS/SNCB holds a Royal Warrant from the Court of Belgium.

== Operations ==
Route map

In 2008, NMBS/SNCB carried 207 million passengers a total of 8,676 million passenger-kilometres over a network of 3,536 kilometres (2,197 mi) (of which 2,950 km (1,833 mi) are electrified, mainly at 3,000 V DC and 351 km (218 mi) at 25 kV 50 Hz AC). In 2024, that number rose to 245 million passengers carried. The rail network has expanded to 3,733 km (2,320 mi) of which 3,286 km (2,042 mi) are electrified.

The network currently includes four high speed lines suitable for 300 km/h (190 mph) traffic: HSL 1 runs from just south of Brussels to the French border, where it continues to a triangular junction with LGV Nord for Paris Nord and Lille Flandres (and London beyond that), HSL 2 runs from Leuven to Ans and onward to Liège-Guillemins, HSL 3 runs from Liège to the German border near Aachen and HSL 4 connects with HSL-Zuid in the Netherlands to allow services to run from Antwerpen-Centraal to Rotterdam Centraal.

== National enforcement body ==
If passengers are not satisfied with the answer of railway companies or do not receive any answer in one month, they can seek the assistance of the Federal Public Service Mobility and Transport. Ombudsrail, the ombudsman service for rail passengers, acts as an mediator if you are unable to resolve an issue with the rail operator.

== Modern ticket system ==
First demo train ticket on 9 March 1992

The System for Automation of Domestic and International Traffic (SABIN) is the NMBS/SNCB ticket sales system for domestic and international train travel in Belgium released on 8 December 1992. It was developed in 1991–1992 by Digital Equipment Belgium for the Belgian Railways. The ticket office system exists alongside the online system (internet and app) and ticket machines.

On 8 December 1992 the first train ticket was sold at the Brussels Leopold Station. Other pilot stations were Charleroi-Sud en Sint-Niklaas. From 1 February 1993 till end September the system was deployed in another 255 train stations. 63 smaller train stations were not admitted to the system. It was the largest project of Digital Equipment Belgium, and a major IT investment program for the national Belgian railway company. In 2026, 34 years after its conception, the system was still in use.

It replaced a smaller standalone Prodata ticket sales system, which in turn replaced the 19th century lead plate system in the 1980s.

It originally ran on VAX/VMS, with a central VAXcluster and remote MicroVAX client systems. It was later migrated to OpenVMS on Itanium. The central computer administers the fares, the season tickets, the topology of the train network, including all distances between all stations. This reference data is made available to the various points of sale. Each train station has a local client system that can process most transactions independently. In 2009, the system was expanded with Lisa. Where there is no station, there are unattended ticket machines, or passengers can purchase an electronic ticket using the app or via the website.

The system is quite complex, due to the multitude of fare formulas and the countless discounts that travellers can obtain, group travel, or combination tickets with museums, zoos, or other events. For the customer, this means an improvement in the service provided: season tickets are delivered immediately rather than after a four-day waiting period. Errors by staff are avoided thanks to automatic checks on the validity of the route, the journey times, and the scheduling of train stations and tourist events. The tickets have a uniform format (ATB, automatic ticketing and boarding). Fifty stations also sell international train tickets. Transactions are reported to the accounts department and are also used for statistical analysis and auditing. In accordance with Belgian language legislation, the central sales report is printed alternately in French or Dutch, depending on whether the date is an odd or even number.

The system was developed by around thirty engineers, analysts and programmers. The platform runs on TDMS and DECnet. The database is VAX/Rdb. VAXset, Pascal, COBOL and some MACRO assembler modules are used as development tools. VAX/Document, based on TeX, is used for documentation. The initial investment amounted to 686 million BEF, including infrastructure, software development and implementation. It was installed in 258 stations. The NADIA-network of the NMBS/SNCB interconnects all domestic systems, and the international booking systems.

== Gallery ==
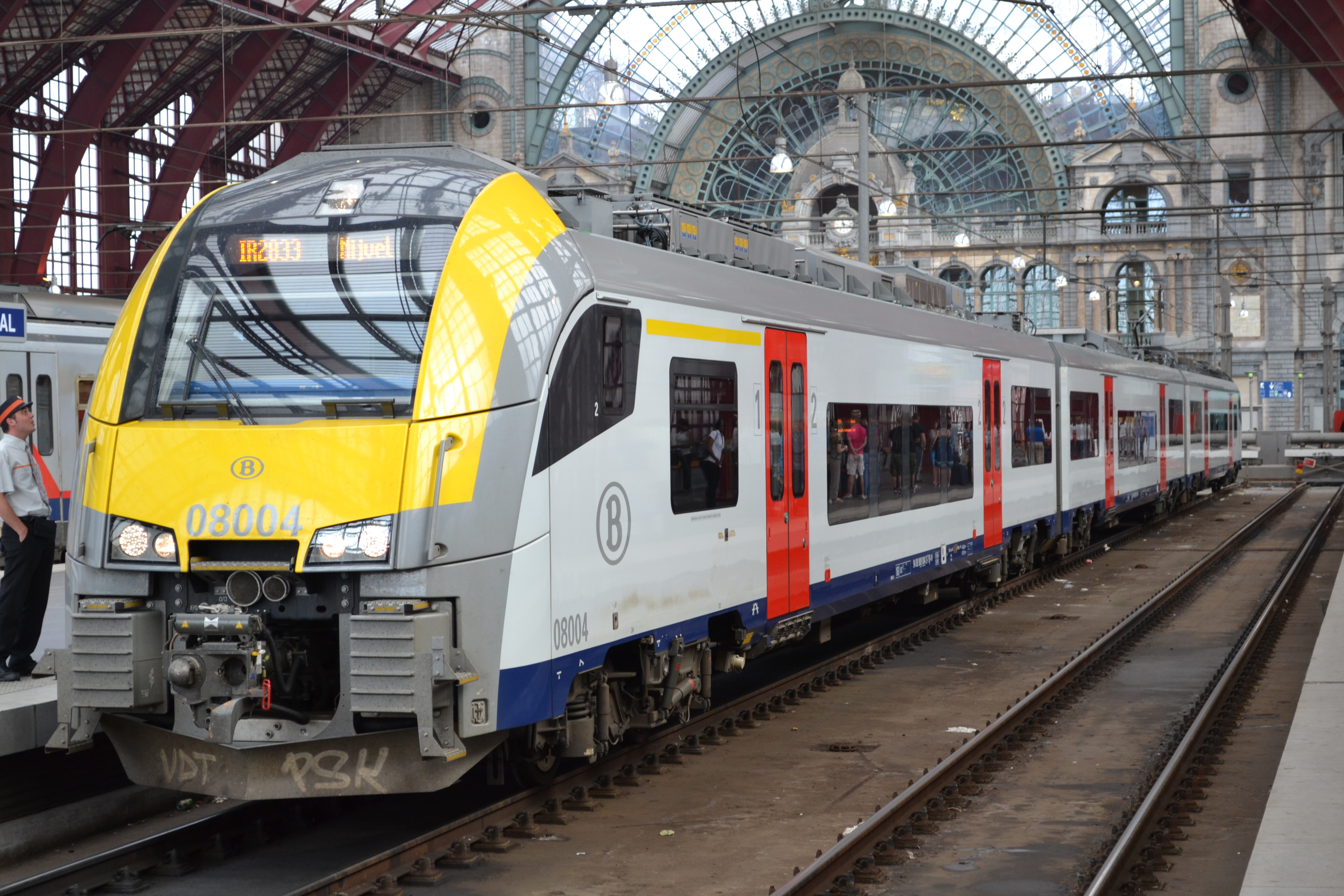
NMBS/SNCB MS08/AM08 Desiro train in Antwerp-Central station

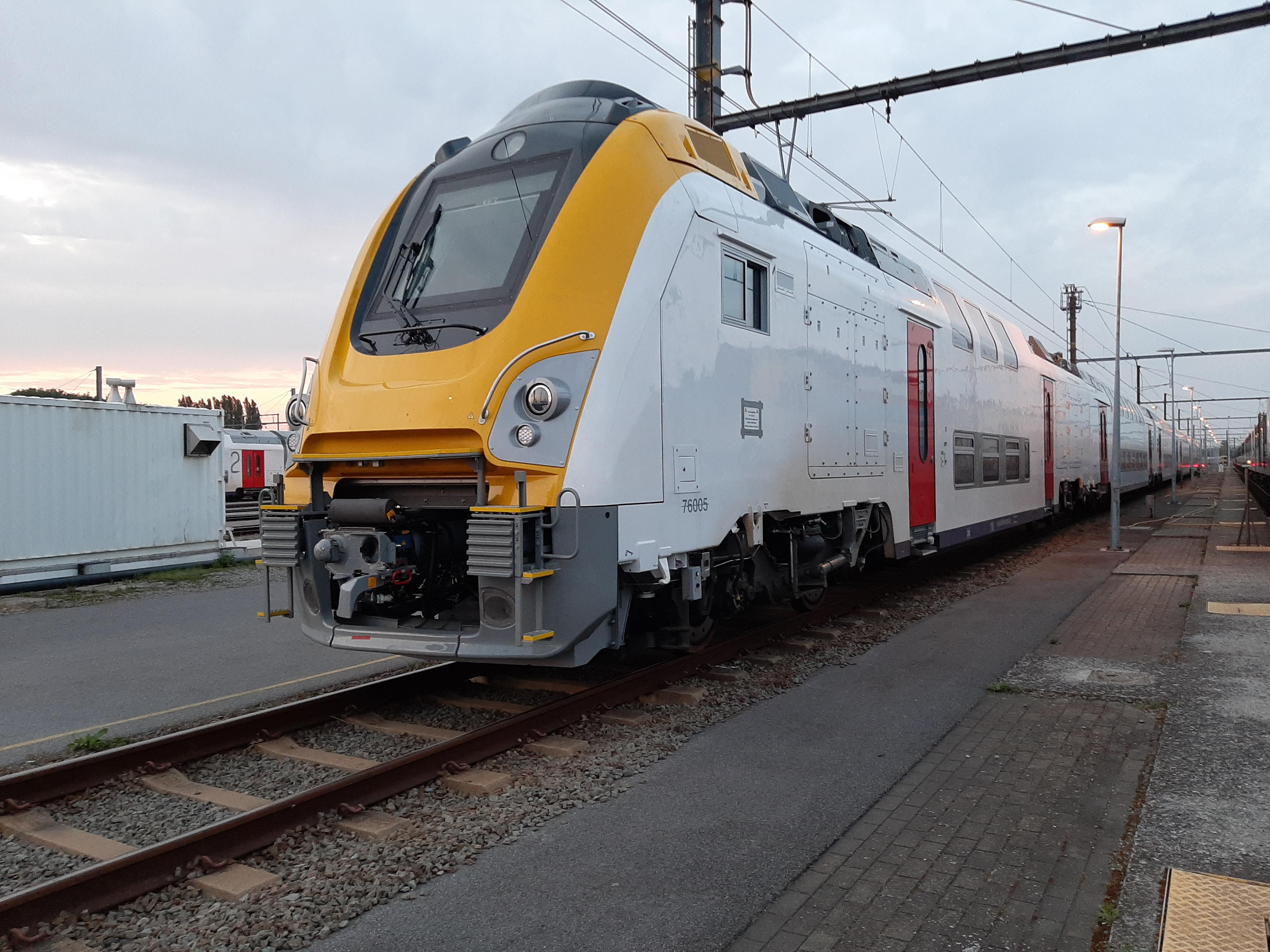
NMBS/SNCB M7 double-decker train

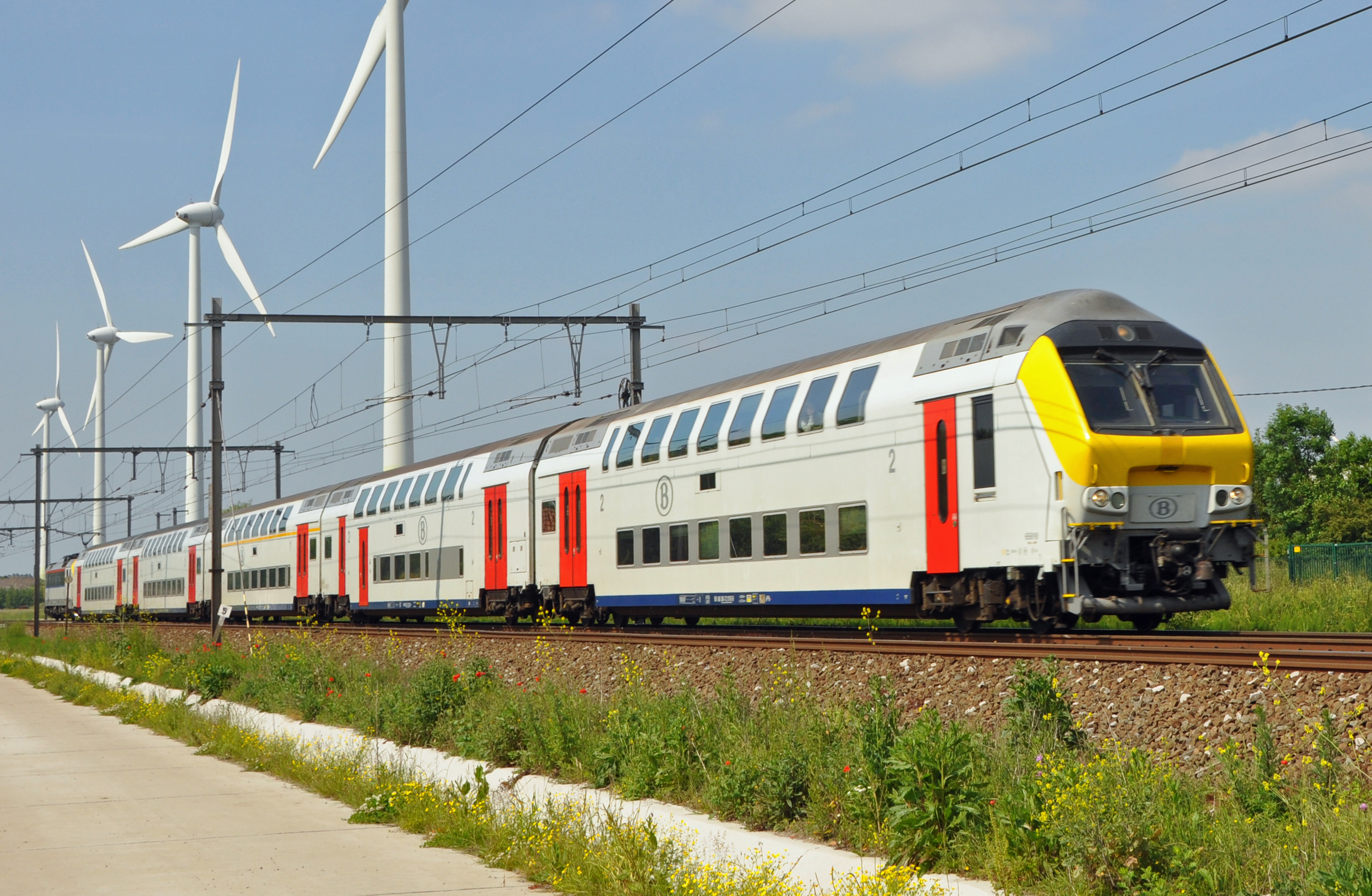
NMBS/SNCB M6 double-decker train

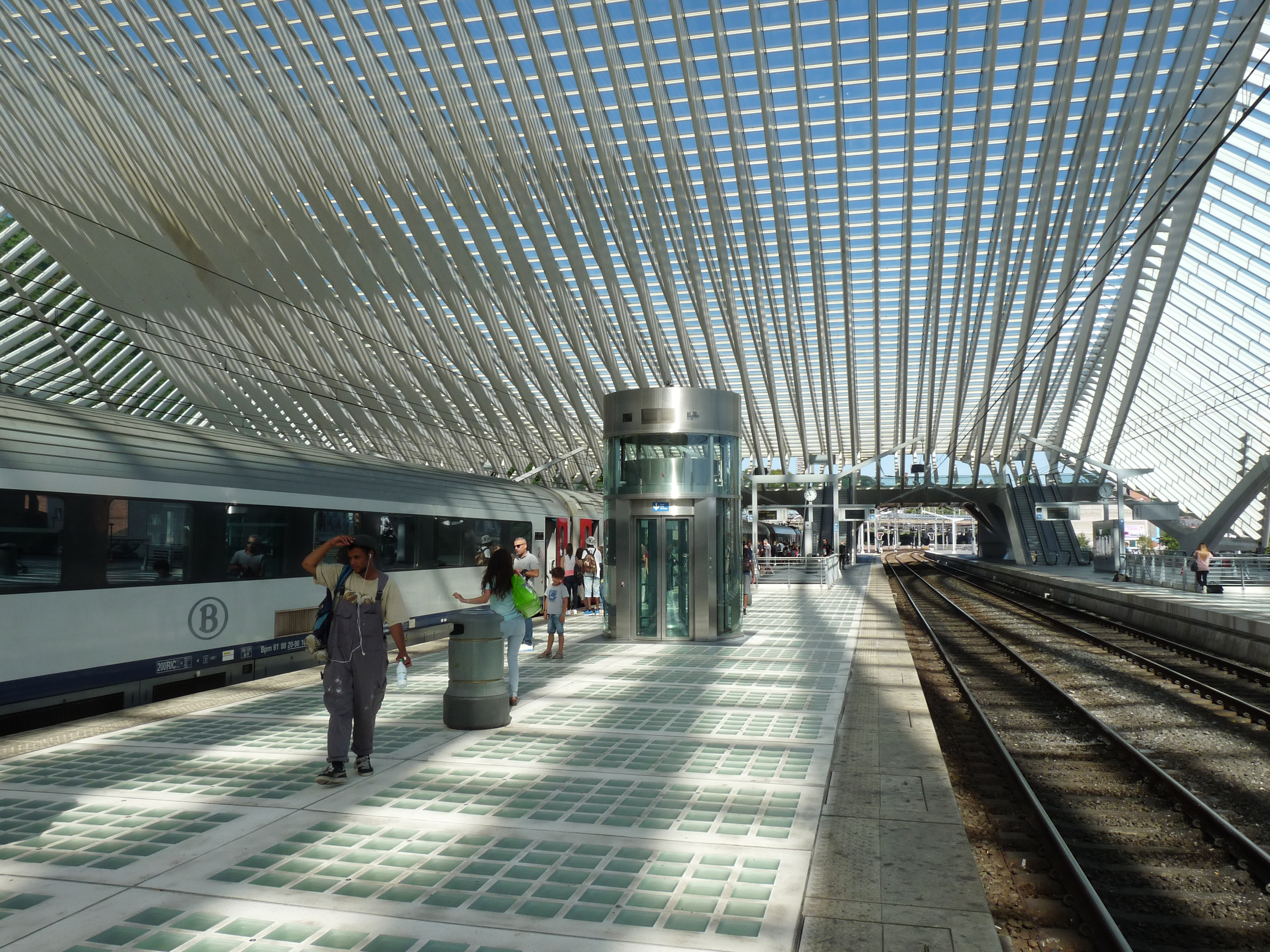
Liège-Guillemins station

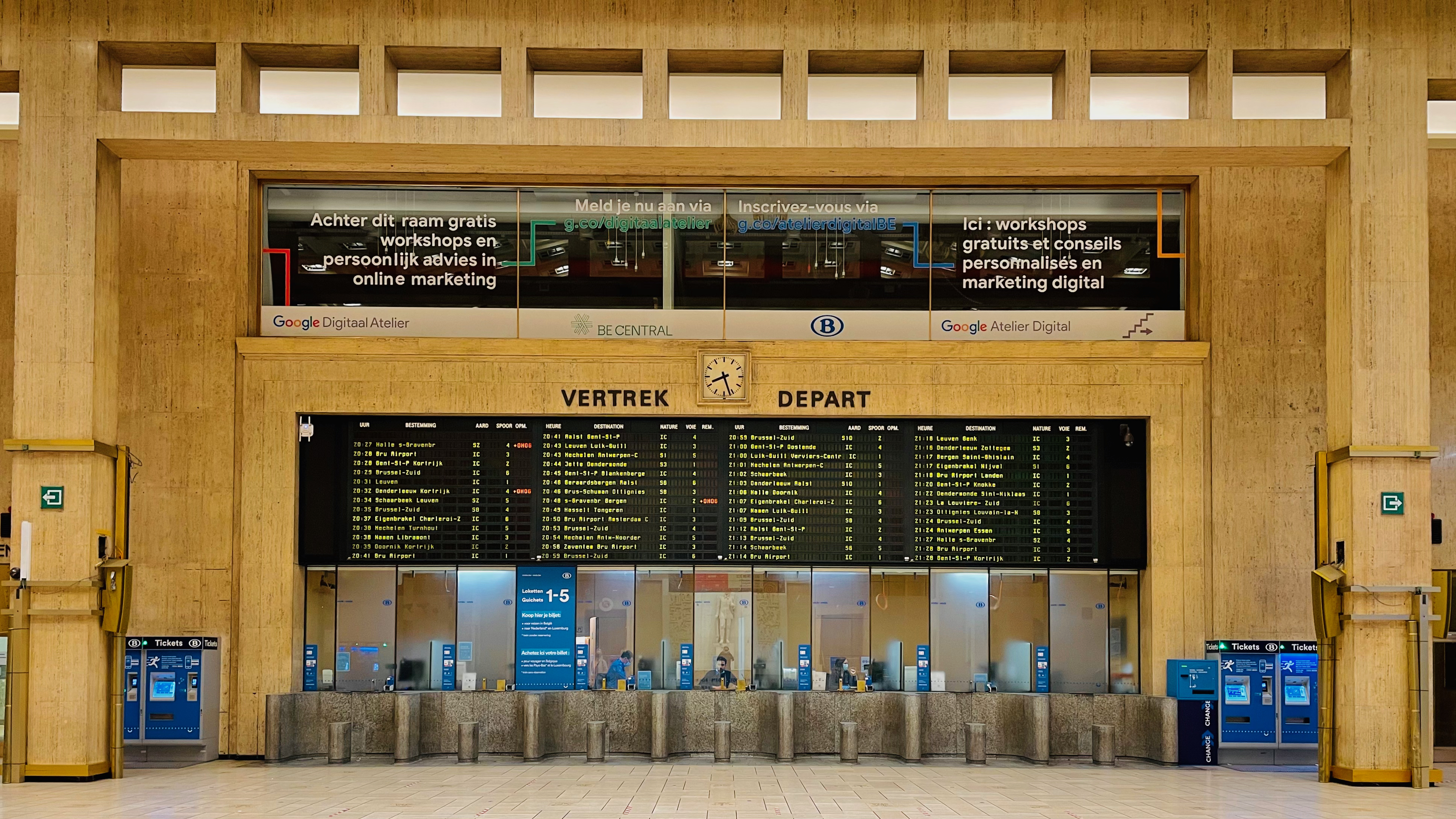
Brussels-Central station's main hall

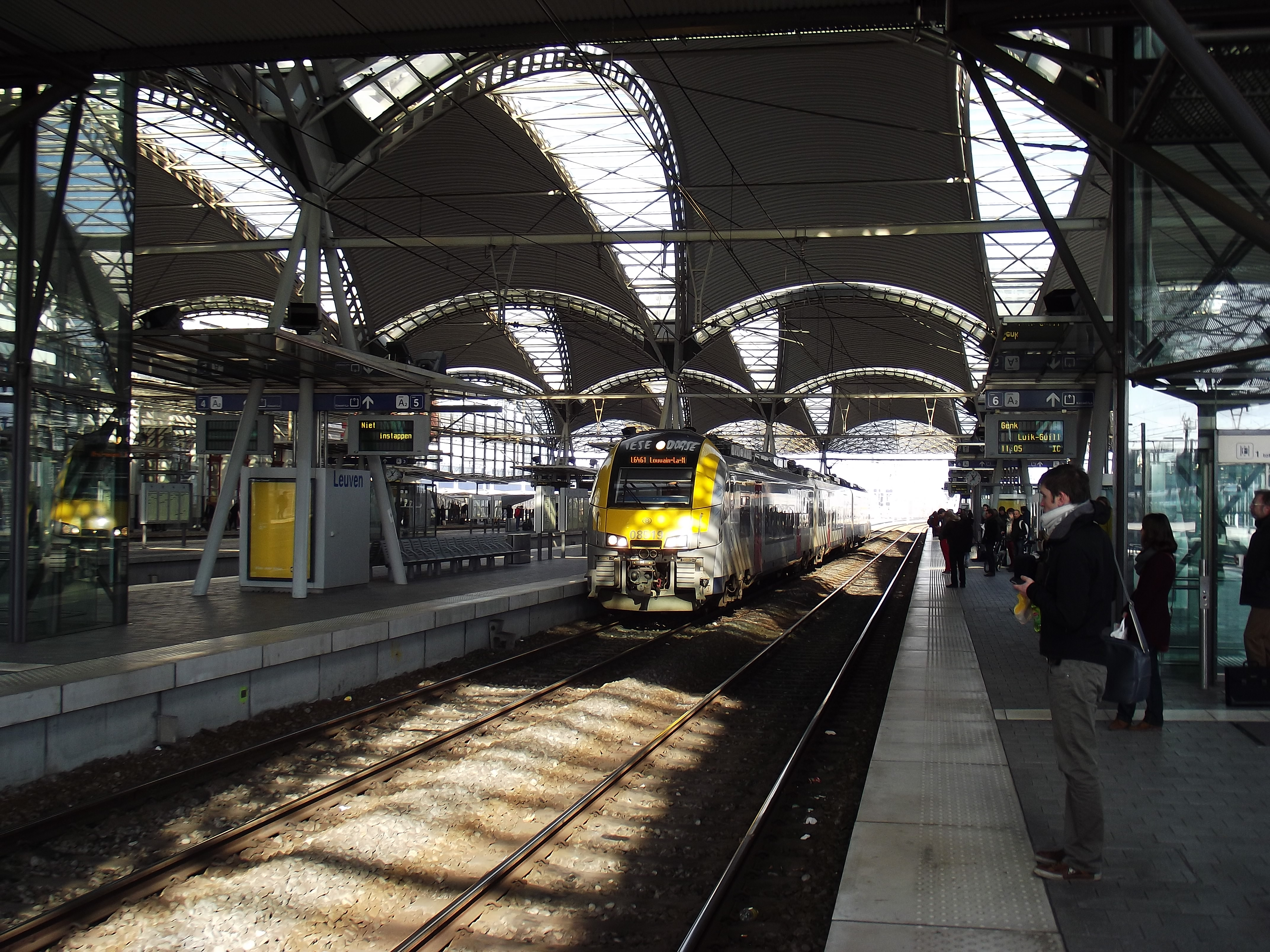
NMBS/SNCB MS08/AM08 Desiro train in Leuven station

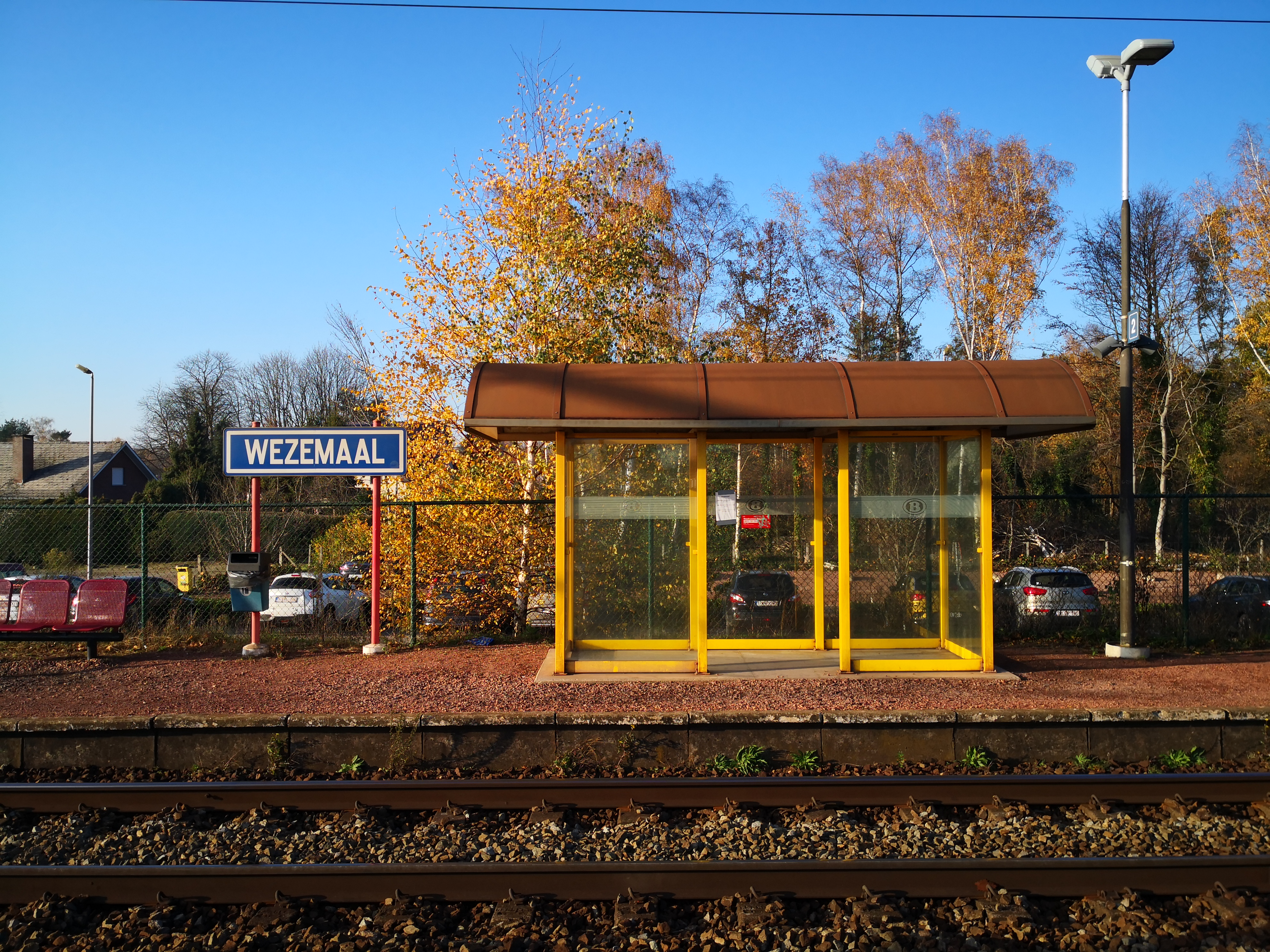
Wezemaal station in 2020 before renovation, with old station sign

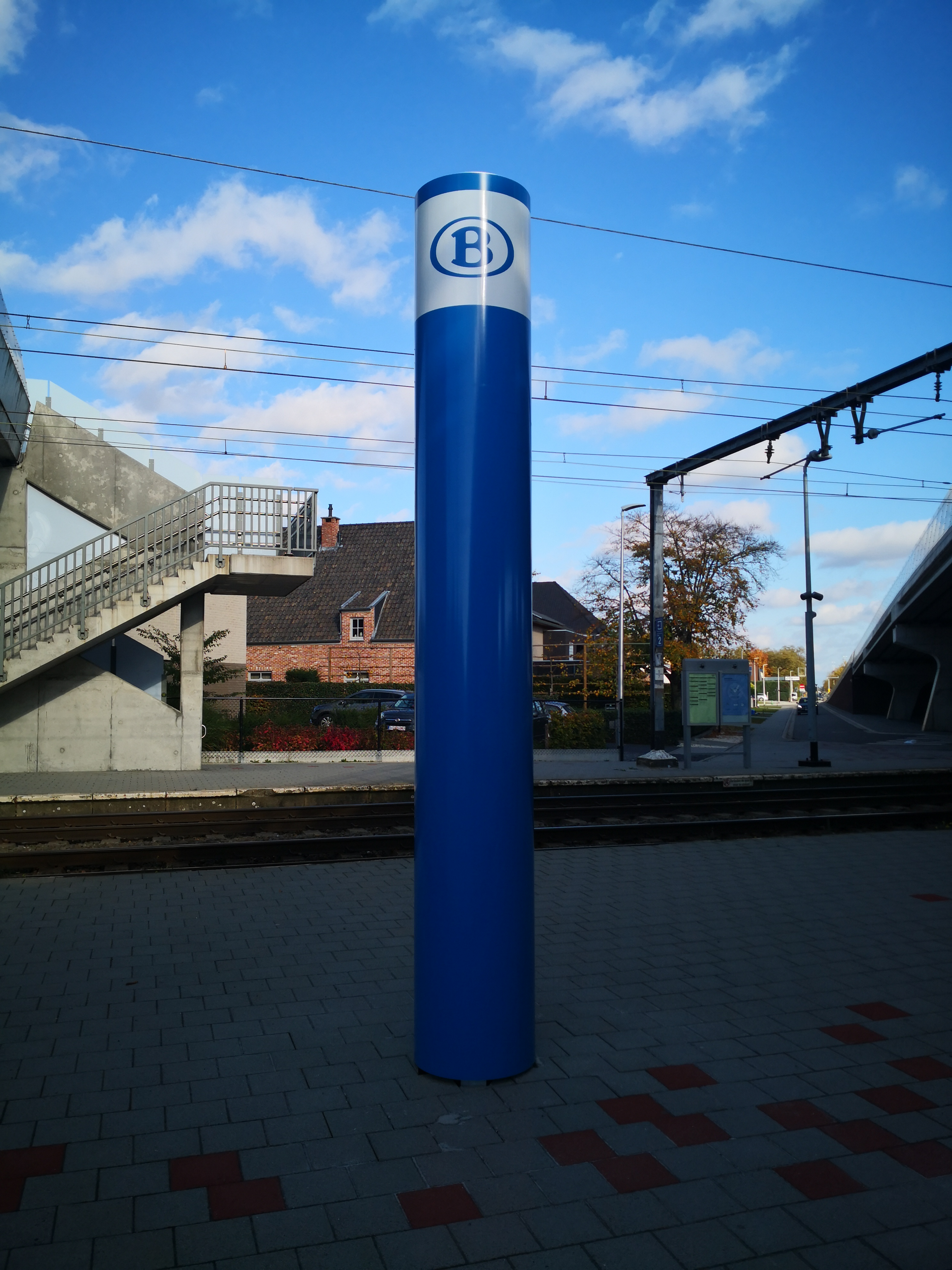
Kiewit station pylon with B logo

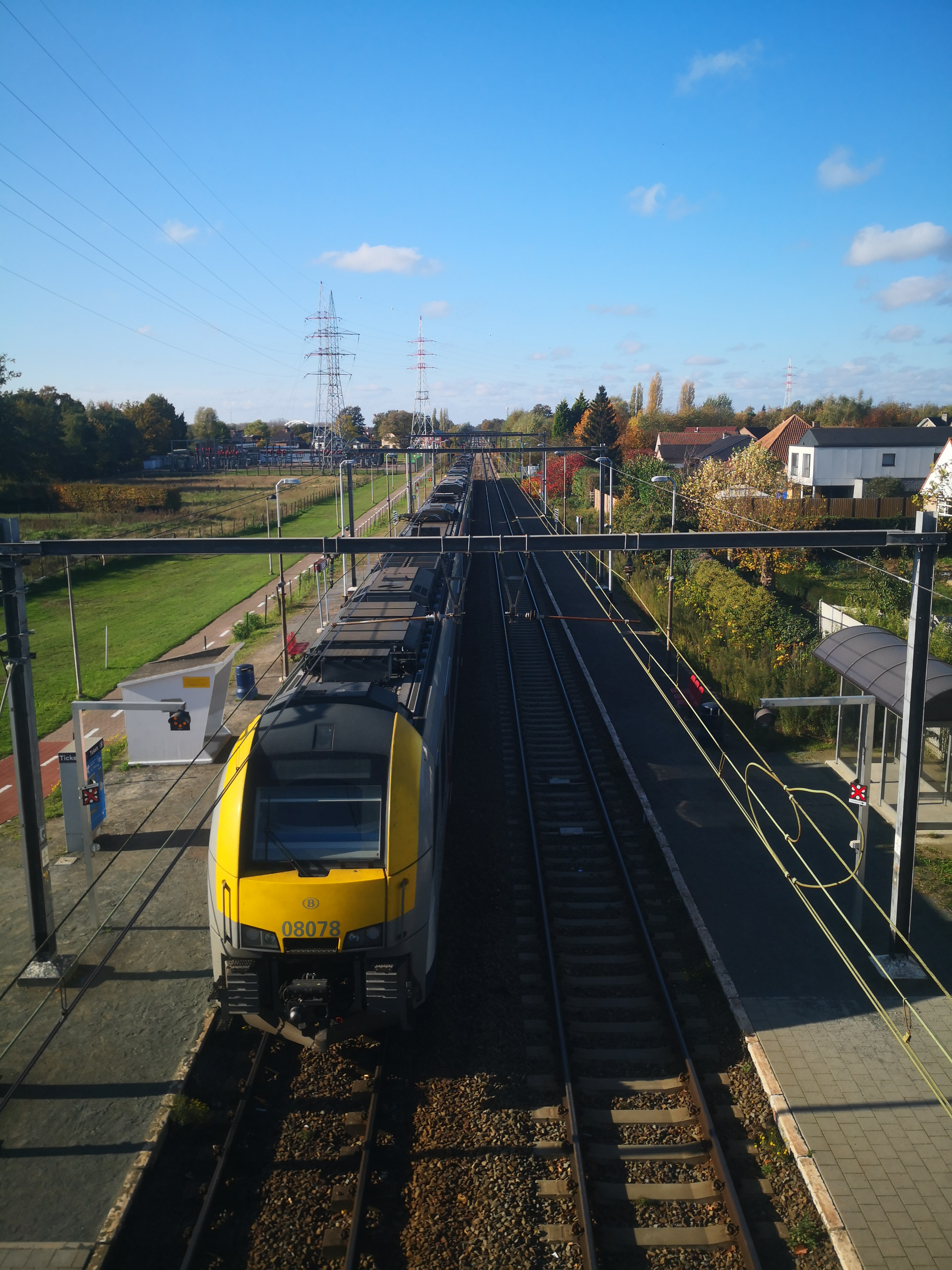
NMBS/SNCB MS08/AM08 Desiro train in Kiewit

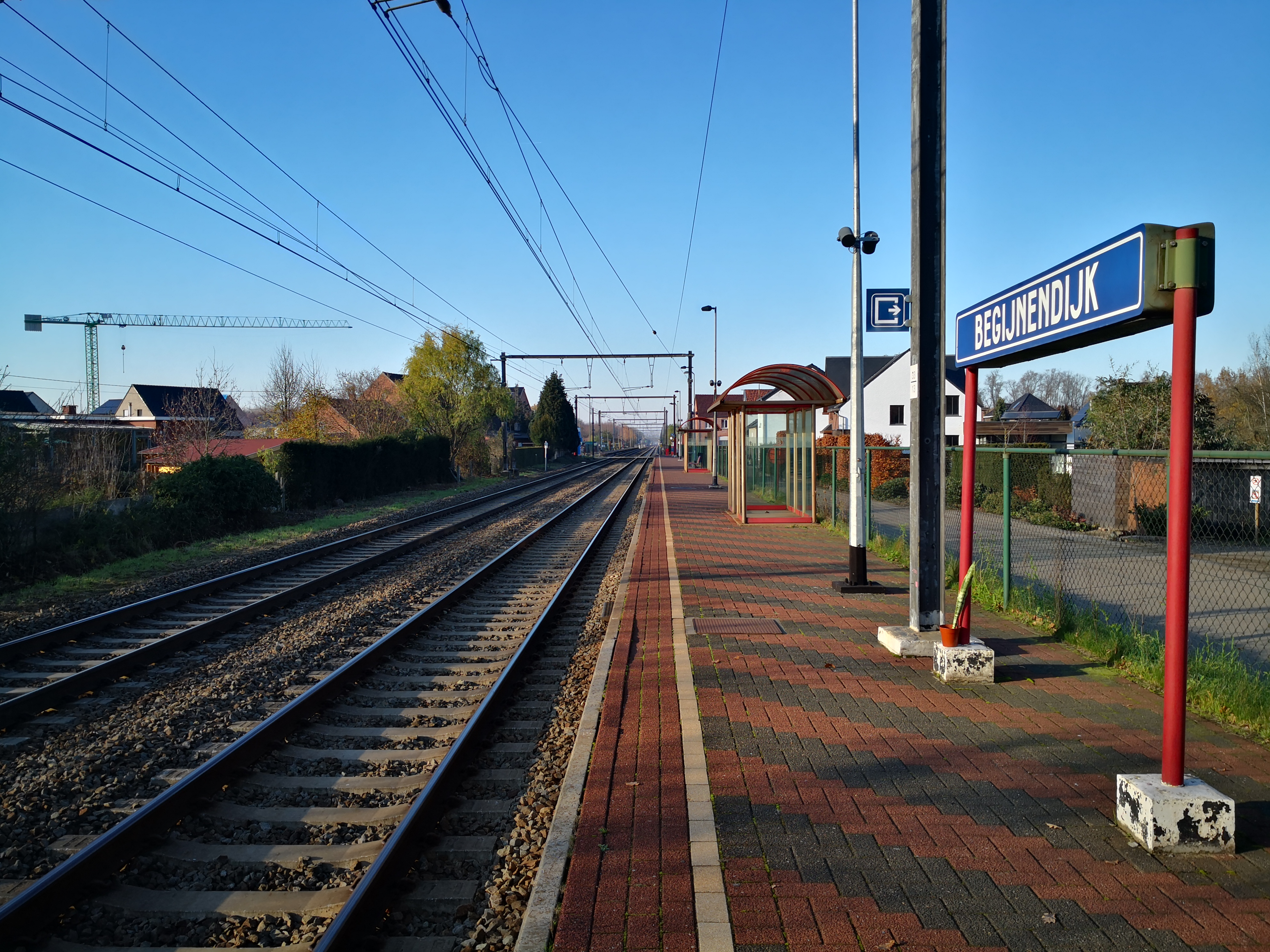
Begijnendijk station in 2020

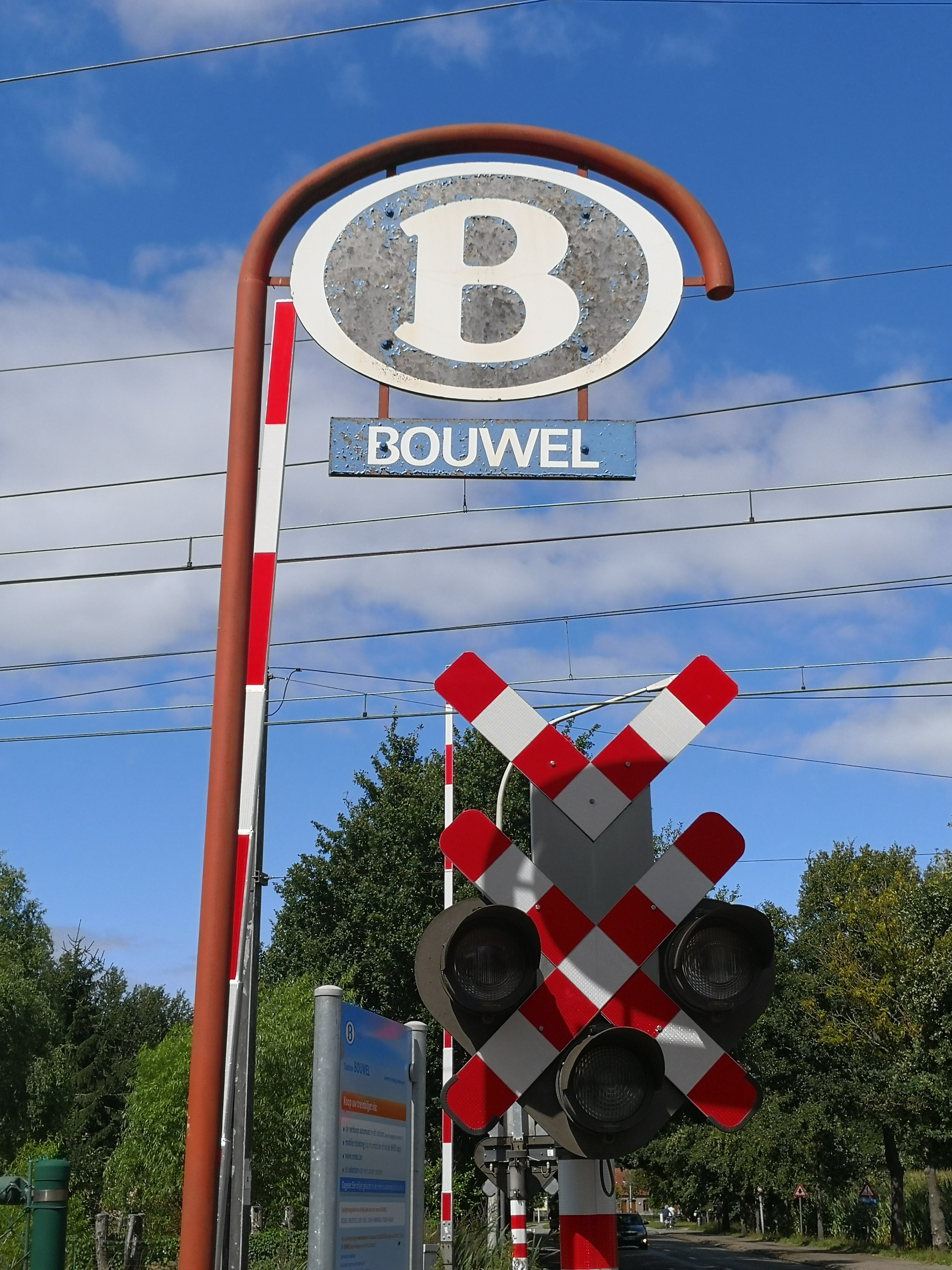
Bouwel station with B logo with level crossing signs

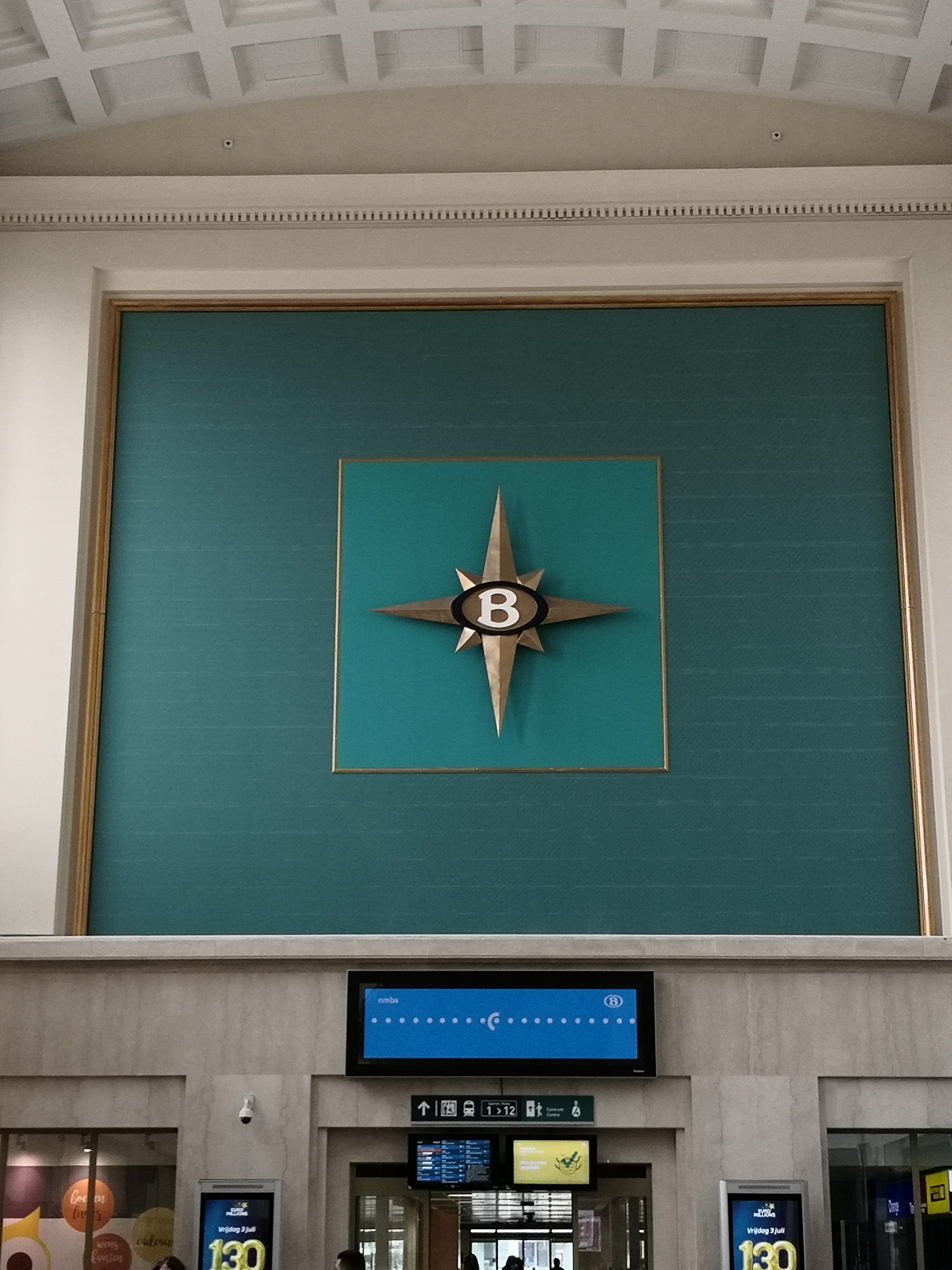
B logo in Brussels-North station

== See also ==
- Eurostar Group - NMBS/SNCB holds a 18.5% stake
- History of rail transport in Belgium
- List of railway lines in Belgium
- List of SNCB/NMBS classes
- Rail transport in Belgium
- Transportation in Belgium
