= Lokeren railway station =

Railway station in East Flanders, Belgium

Lokeren
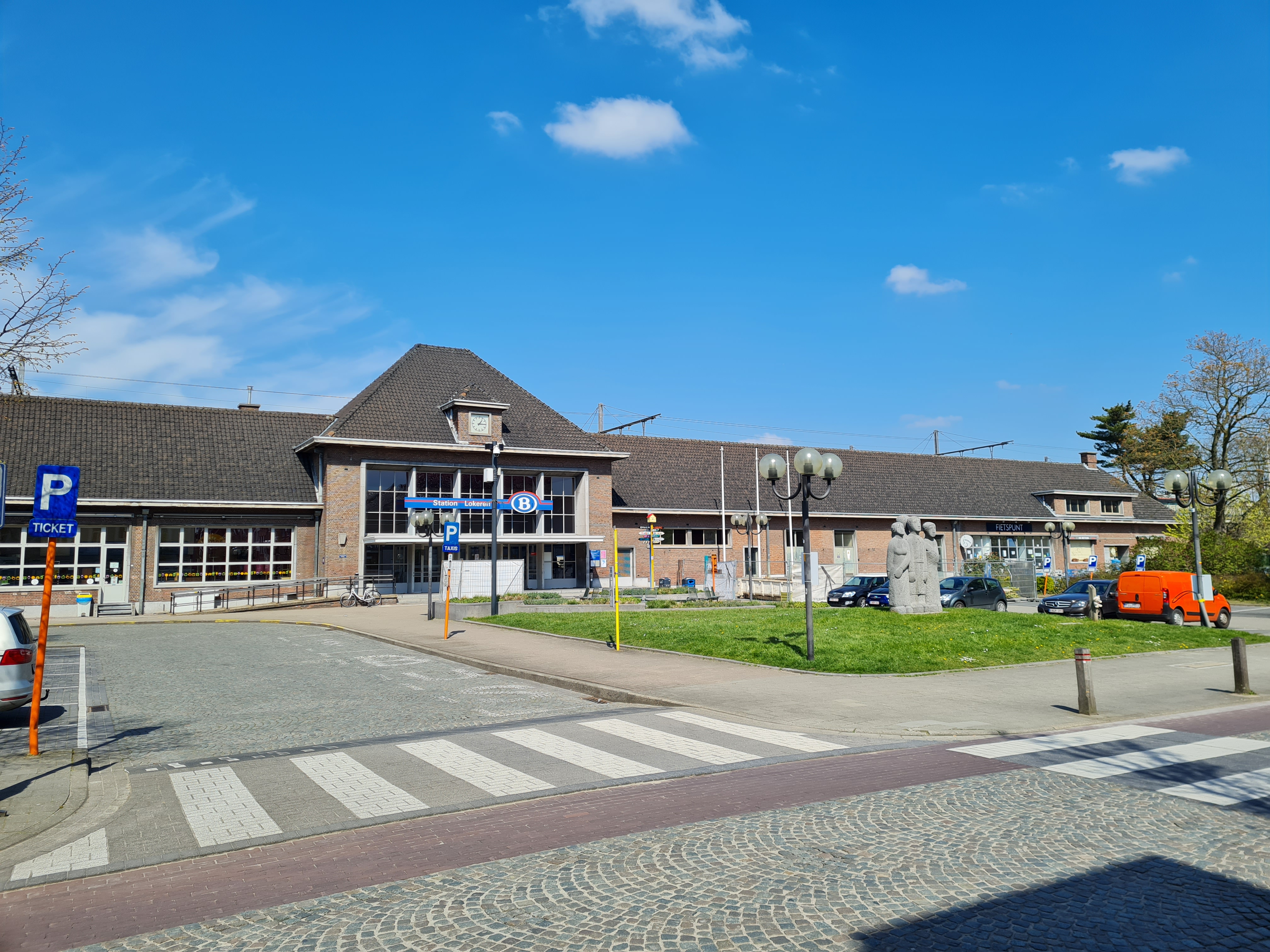
- Lokeren railway station

General information
- Location: Lokeren, East Flanders; Belgium
- Coordinates: 51°06′26″N 3°59′09″E
- System: Railway Station
- Owner: NMBS/SNCB
- Operator: NMBS/SNCB
- Lines: 57, 59
- Platforms: 6
- Tracks: 6

Other information
- Station code: FLK

History
- Opened: 9 August 1847; 179 years ago

Passengers
- 2009: 5,039 per day
Location
- Location within Belgium Location within Europe

Lokeren railway station (Dutch: Station Lokeren; French: Gare de Lokeren) (Note: Officially Lokeren) is a railway station in Lokeren, East Flanders, Belgium. The station opened on 9 August 1847 and is located on railway lines 57 and 59. The train services are operated by the National Railway Company of Belgium (NMBS/SNCB).

== Train services ==
The station is served by the following services:

- Intercity services (IC-02) Ostend - Bruges - Ghent - Sint-Niklaas - Antwerpen
- Intercity services (IC-04) Lille/Poperinge - Kortrijk - Ghent - Sint-Niklaas - Antwerp
- Intercity services (IC-20) Lokeren - Dendermonde - Brussels - Aalst - Ghent (weekends)
- Intercity services (IC-26) Kortrijk - Tournai - Halle - Brussels - Dendermonde - Lokeren - Sint Niklaas (weekdays)
- Intercity services (IC-28) Ghent - Sint-Niklaas - Antwerp (weekdays)
- Local services (L-30) Lokeren - Sint-Niklaas - Antwerp

Preceding station	NMBS/SNCB	Following station
Gent-Dampoort towards Oostende	IC 02	Sint-Niklaas towards Antwerpen-Centraal
Beervelde towards Lille-Flandres or Poperinge	IC 04	Sint-Niklaas towards Antwerpen-Centraal
Zele towards Gent-Sint-Pieters	IC 20 weekends	Terminus
Zele towards Kortrijk	IC 26 weekdays	Sinaai towards Sint-Niklaas
Beervelde towards De Panne	IC 28 weekdays	Sint-Niklaas towards Antwerpen-Centraal
Terminus	L 30	Sinaai towards Antwerpen-Centraal

== See also ==
- List of railway stations in Belgium
- Rail transport in Belgium
