= Harelbeke railway station =

Railway station in West Flanders, Belgium

Harelbeke

General information
- Coordinates: 50.8564°N 3.3144°E
- System: Railway Station
- Owner: National Railway Company of Belgium
- Line: 75
- Platforms: 2

Other information
- Station code: FHL

History
- Opened: 1839
Location

Harelbeke railway station is in the city of Harelbeke in the Belgian province of West Flanders. It is on Line 75 between Ghent and Kortrijk and across the French border to Lille.

== Train services ==
The station is served by the following services:

- Intercity services (IC-12) Kortrijk - Ghent - Brussels - Leuven - Liege - Welkenraedt (weekdays)
- Intercity services (IC-12) Kortrijk - Ghent (weekends)

Preceding station	NMBS/SNCB	Following station
Kortrijk Terminus	IC 12 weekdays, except holidays	Waregem towards Welkenraedt
Kortrijk Terminus	IC 12 weekends	Waregem towards Gent-Sint-Pieters
