= Gentbrugge railway station =

Railway station in East Flanders, Belgium

Gentbrugge
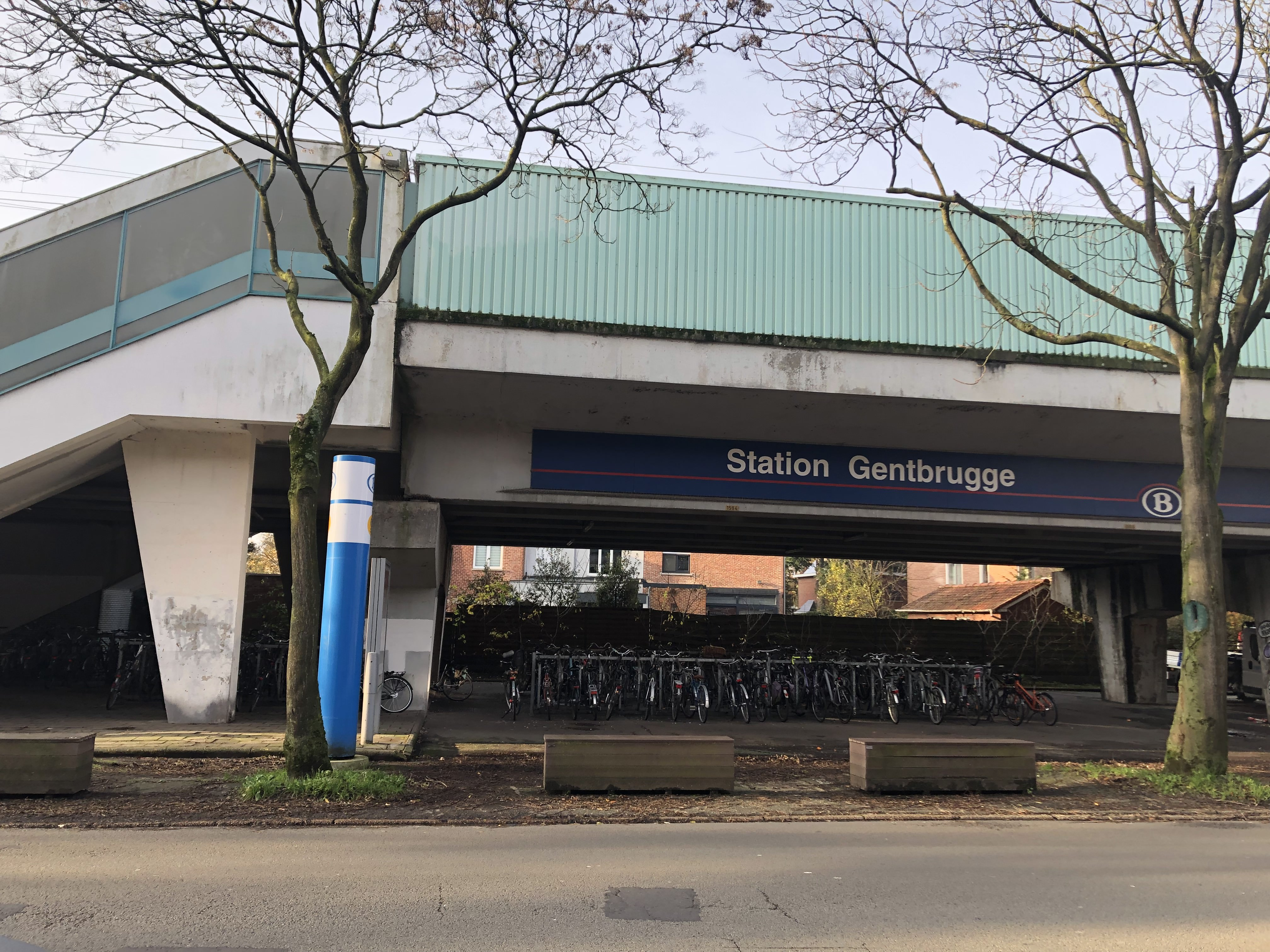
- Gentbrugge railway station

General information
- Location: Robert Rinskopf Laan 55, Ghent
- Coordinates: 51°2′20″N 3°45′22″E
- System: Railway Station
- Owner: National Railway Company of Belgium
- Lines: 58, 59
- Platforms: 2 side platforms
- Tracks: 2

Other information
- Station code: FUGE

History
- Opened: 15 June 1861
- Rebuilt: 1973
- Electrified: 1970

Passengers
- 2009: 127972
Location

Gentbrugge is a third smaller railway station in Ghent, East Flanders, Belgium. The station opened on 15 June 1861 on the Lines 58 and 59. The train services are operated by NMBS/SNCB.

The current building was built in 1973 by architects Dirk Servaes and Johan Beyne. These are the same architects who designed the railway station of Gent-Dampoort.

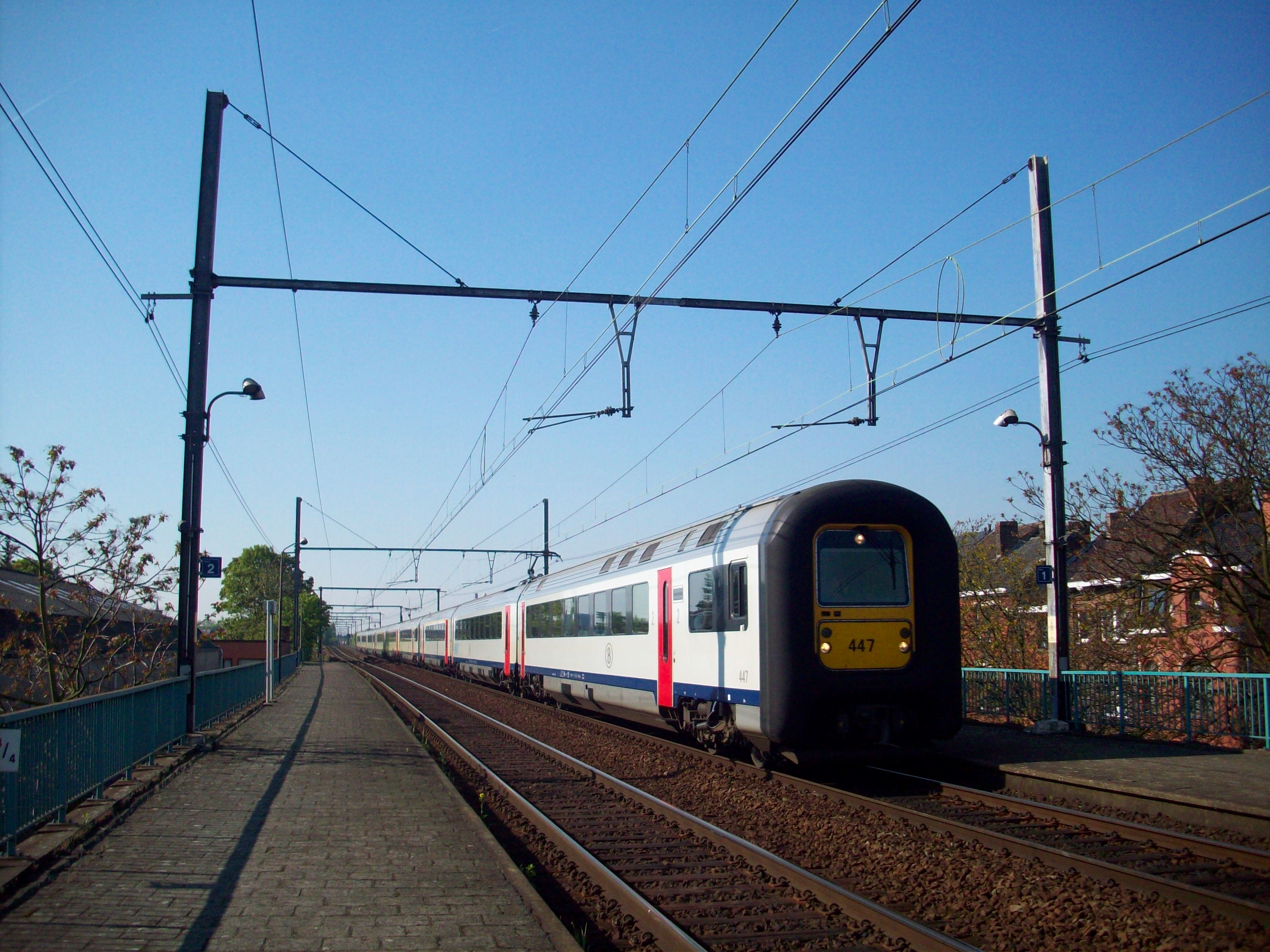
AM96 at Gentbrugge railway station

== Train services ==
The station is served by the following services:

- Local services (L-05) Eeklo - Ghent - Oudenaarde - Ronse
- Local services (L-05) Eeklo - Ghent - Oudenaarde - Kortrijk (weekdays)

Preceding station	NMBS/SNCB	Following station
Gent-Dampoort towards Eeklo	L 05 weekdays, except holidays	Gent-Sint-Pieters towards Ronse or Kortrijk
Gent-Dampoort towards Eeklo	L 05 weekends	Gent-Sint-Pieters towards Ronse
