= Gent-Dampoort railway station =

Railway station in East Flanders, Belgium

Gent-Dampoort
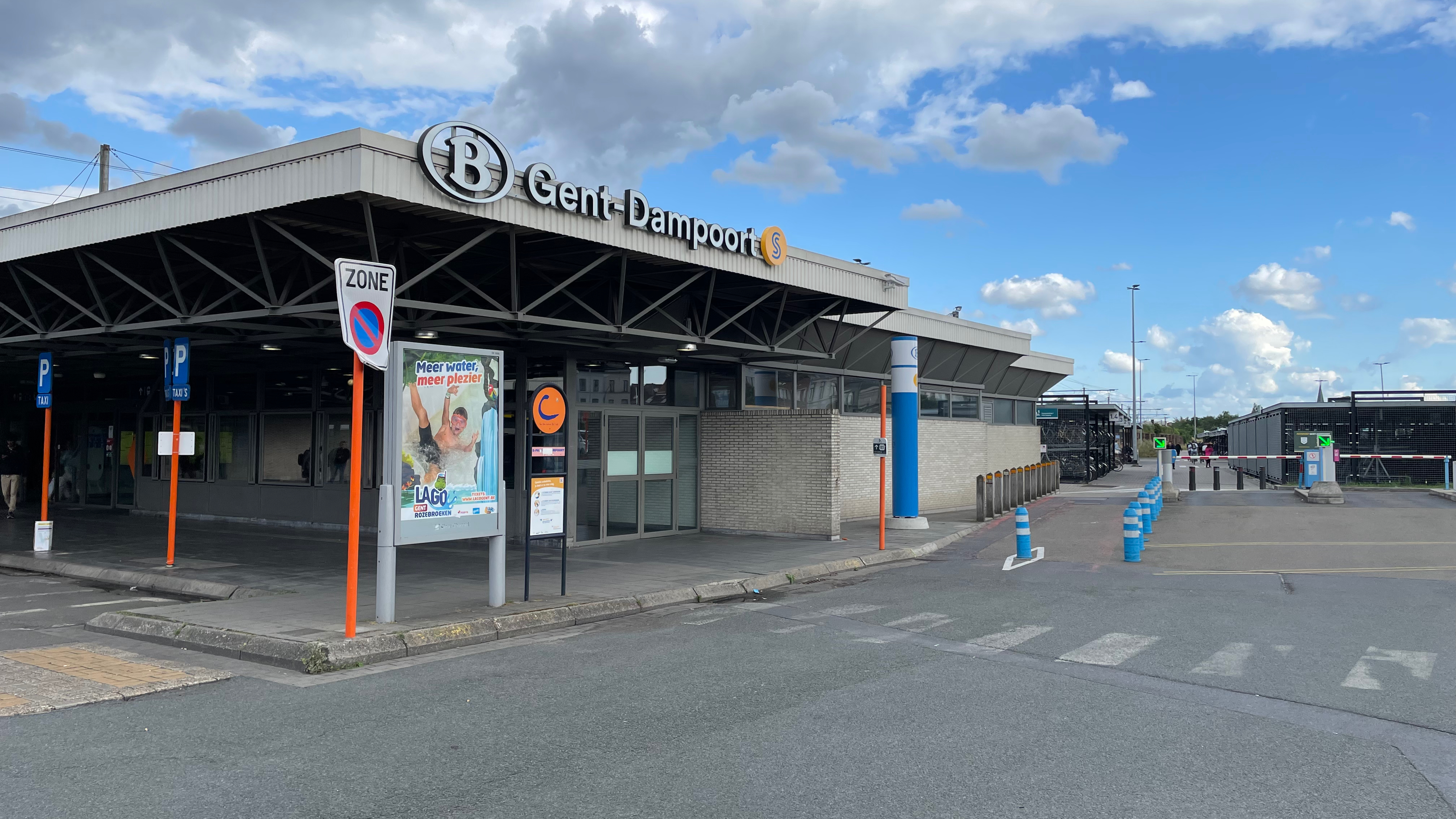
- Gent-Dampoort railway station

General information
- Location: Oktrooiplein 10, Ghent; Belgium
- Coordinates: 51°3′20″N 3°44′27″E
- System: Railway Station
- Owner: NMBS/SNCB
- Operator: NMBS/SNCB
- Lines: 58 and 59
- Platforms: Centre platform
- Tracks: 2 + 1 for passing trains

Other information
- Station code: FGDM

History
- Opened: 15 June 1861; 165 years ago
- Rebuilt: 1973; 53 years ago
- Electrified: 1970

Passengers
- 2009: 1611376
Location
- Location within Belgium Location within Europe

Gent-Dampoort railway station (Dutch: Station Gent-Dampoort; French: Gare de Gand-Dampoort) (Note: Officially Gent-Dampoort (Dutch: Gent-Dampoort; French: Gand-Dampoort)) is the second largest railway station in Ghent, East Flanders, Belgium. It is situated in the Dampoort neighbourhood, after which it is named.

The station opened on 15 June 1861 on railway lines 58 and 59. The current building was built in 1973 by the architects Dirk Servaes and Johan Beyne. The train services are operated by the National Railway Company of Belgium (NMBS/SNCB).

== Train services ==
The station is served by the following services:

- Intercity services (IC-02) Ostend - Bruges - Ghent - Sint-Niklaas - Antwerpen
- Intercity services (IC-04) Lille/Poperinge - Kortrijk - Ghent - Sint-Niklaas - Antwerp
- Intercity services (IC-28) Ghent - Sint-Niklaas - Antwerp (weekdays)
- Local services (L-05) Eeklo - Ghent - Oudenaarde - Ronse
- Local services (L-05) Eeklo - Ghent - Oudenaarde - Kortrijk (weekdays)

Preceding station	NMBS/SNCB	Following station
Gent-Sint-Pieters towards Oostende	IC 02	Lokeren towards Antwerpen-Centraal
Gent-Sint-Pieters towards Lille-Flandres or Poperinge	IC 04	Beervelde towards Antwerpen-Centraal
Gent-Sint-Pieters towards De Panne	IC 28	Beervelde towards Antwerpen-Centraal
Wondelgem towards Eeklo	L 05 weekdays, except holidays	Gentbrugge towards Ronse or Kortrijk
Wondelgem towards Eeklo	L 05 weekends	Gentbrugge towards Ronse

== See also ==
- List of railway stations in Belgium
- Rail transport in Belgium
