= Gent-Sint-Pieters railway station =

Railway station in East Flanders, Belgium

Gent-Sint-Pieters
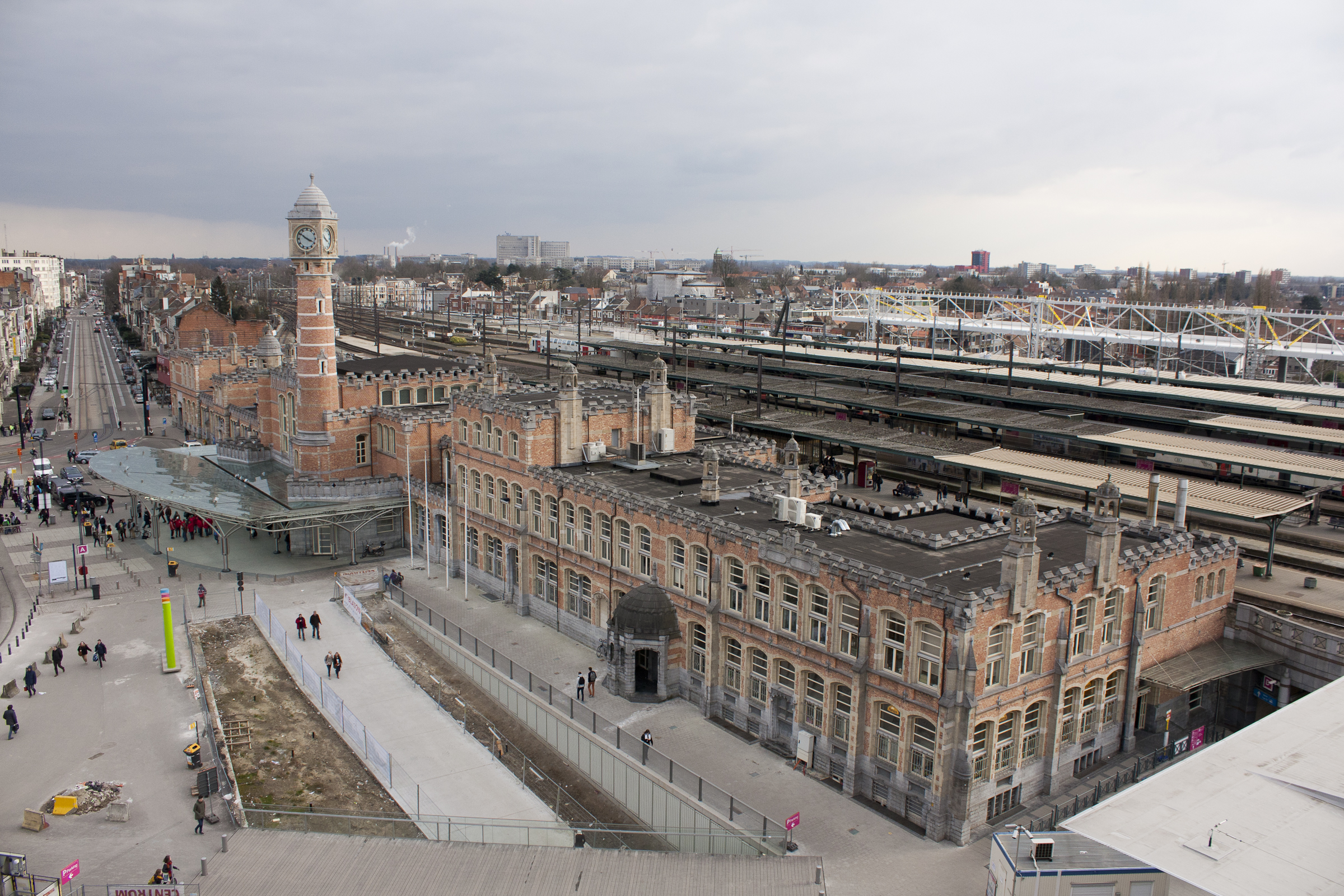
- Gent-Sint-Pieters railway station

General information
- Location: Koningin Maria Hendrikaplein, 9000 Ghent; Belgium
- Coordinates: 51°02′07″N 3°42′35″E
- System: Railway Station
- Owner: NMBS/SNCB
- Operator: NMBS/SNCB
- Lines: 50, 50A, 58, 59, 75
- Platforms: 12
- Tracks: 12

Construction
- Cycle facilities: 17,000 (under construction)

Other information
- Station code: GSTP

History
- Opened: 1912; 114 years ago
- Rebuilt: 2010–present

Passengers
- 2018: 16.7 million
Location
- Location within Belgium Location within Europe

Gent-Sint-Pieters railway station (Dutch: Station Gent-Sint-Pieters; French: Gare de Gand-Saint-Pierre) (Note: Officially Gent-Sint-Pieters (Dutch: Gent-Sint-Pieters; French: Gand-Saint-Pierre)) is the main railway station in Ghent, East Flanders, Belgium, and the fourth-busiest in Belgium and busiest in Flanders, with 17.65 million passengers a year. The station is operated by the National Railway Company of Belgium (NMBS/SNCB).

== History ==
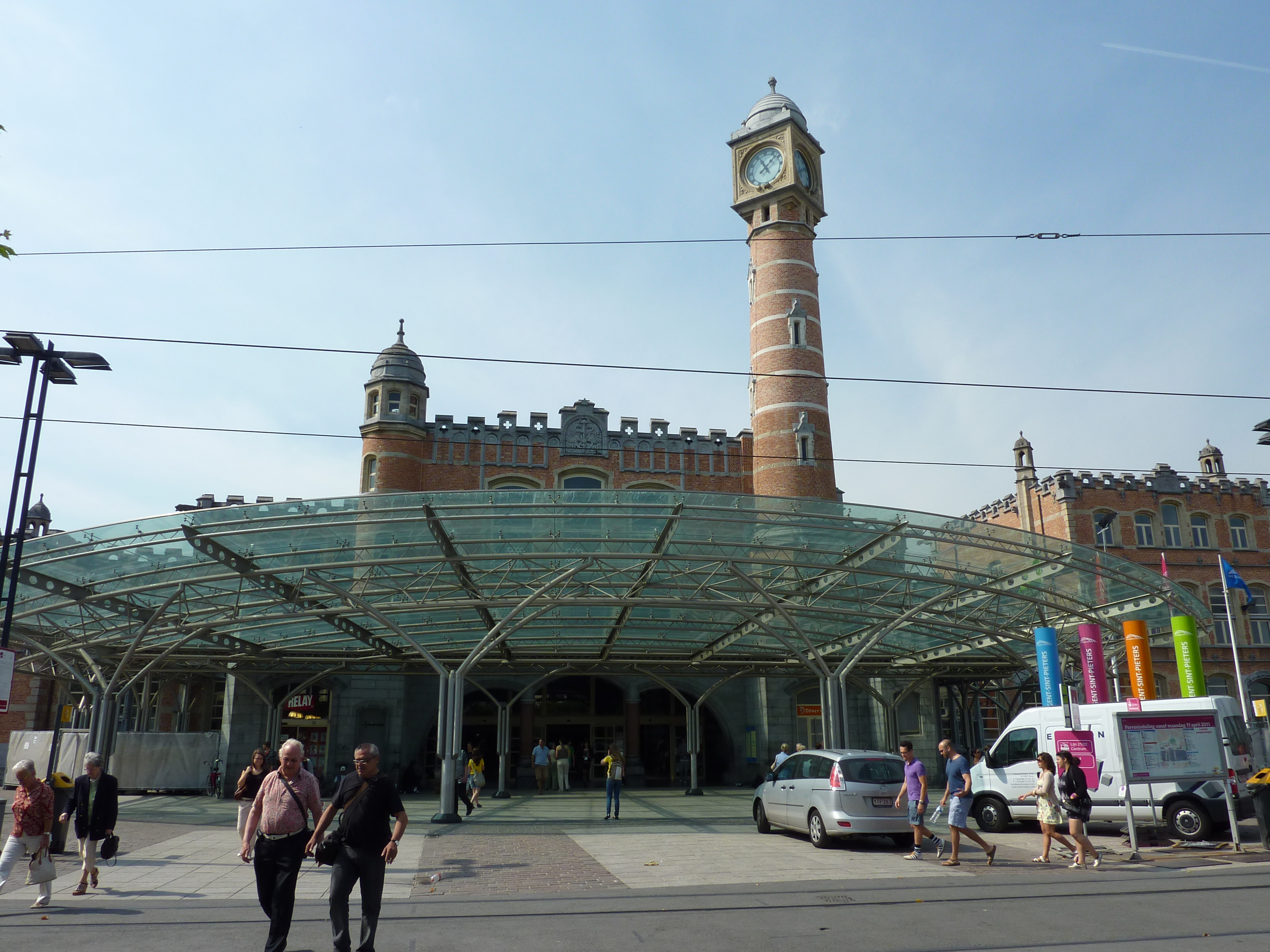
Gent-Sint-Pieters railway station with the glass canopy

The origins of the railway station is a small station on the Ghent–Ostend line in 1881. At that time, the main railway station of Ghent was the South railway station, built in 1837. At the occasion of the 1913 International Exposition in Ghent, a new Sint-Pieters railway station was built. It was designed by the architect Louis Cloquet and finished in 1912 just before the World's Fair.

The station was built in an eclectic style with a long corridor dividing the building in its length which provides access to diverse facilities. A tunnel (designed by ir. P. Grondy) starting from the entrance hall provides access to the twelve platforms. This gives the station its cross-form design. The original waiting rooms for second and third-class passengers now serve as a buffet and restaurant.

The station was classified in 1995. In 1996, the station was renovated, with the renovation of the interior of the western wing completed in 1998. The station was served by a daily Thalys high-speed rail service to Paris between 1998 and 31 March 2015. As of 2025, there is no high-speed rail service and the only international service is to Intercity services (IC-04) to Lille-Flanders.

== Project Gent-Sint-Pieters ==
In 2004, the Project Gent-Sint-Pieters was announced as part of a bigger plan to renovate line 50A between Ghent and Bruges. The reconstructions were planned between 2007 and 2022 and included:

- 12 new, wider and longer platforms with more escalators and a lift for better access
- one big open hall below the platforms instead of the 3 current tunnels
- a tram stop with direct access to the platforms
- a new bus station in front of the railway station
- The Virginie Lovelinggebouw, East Flanders' Flemish Administrative Center
- Renovation of the Maria Hendrikaplein, the square in front of the station
- Renovation of the main entrance building
- A new bicycle parking
- Valentin Vaerweyckweg (T4), a new trunk road connecting the station to the ringroad of Ghent (R4) and A10/E40

The work is necessary to make the station more accessible and to increase capacity as the number of passengers grows every year. This eventually will lead to the removal of several period features that are not part of the classified main building, like the platform canopies, waiting rooms, and the tunnel by P. Grondy.

=== Timeline ===
- In 2007, the tower at the entrance of the station has been renovated.
- In 2008, a new glass canopy was placed at the main entrance.
- In 2010, the murals of the main entrance hall have been renovated. The Valentin Vaerweyckweg (T4) and the temporary tramtunnel were opened. And the first part of the new bus station was put into use. Fase 1 of the station itself (platforms 8-12) started.
- In 2012, the first part of a new underground bicycle parking station was opened, with 1.700 of the intended total of 10.000 parking spots.
- In 2014, the Virginie Lovelinggebouw was finished.
- In 2015, the first new platforms (11 and 12) were put into service.
- In 2017, platforms 10, 9 and 8 were put into use though 8 wasn't finished yet. The project was running late and appeared to be more expensive than anticipated. It was put on hold and new options were investigated to cut costs.
- In January 2020, the new project was announced. The main change was the roof over the platforms. Phase 2 (platforms 7-1) is planned from 2021 until 2026.
- In 2021, Phase 2 of the renovation commenced, focusing on tracks and platforms 6 and 7.
- In 2023, tracks 6 and 7 were fully put into service (completing platform 7-8). A new covered bicycle parking section with 1,160 spots opened at Koningin Mathildeplein.
- In 2024, the bicycle parking was expanded by another 914 spots. Construction began on the viaduct for tracks 4 and 5, as well as the new Infrabel service building and the Rinkkaai residential project.
- In 2025, track 6 was opened for commuters, and work continued on the viaducts for tracks 4 and 5. Construction also started on the Sint-Pieterspoort.
- In 2026, renovation work shifted to the final group of tracks (3, 2, and 1). Construction is underway for the permanent tram station, the final section of the bus station, and the "S-building" on Koningin Mathildeplein. The complete redesign of the public squares (Koningin Maria-Hendrikaplein and Koningin Mathildeplein) is scheduled to continue through 2027.

Because of the restriction of Ghent's car traffic circulation in 2017, the amount of commuters using a bicycle grew. The plans were adjusted accordingly to build 17,000 bicycle parking spots in total.

== Train services ==
The station is served by the following services:

- Intercity services (IC-01) Ostend - Bruges - Ghent - Brussels - Leuven - Liege - Eupen
- Intercity services (IC-02) Ostend - Bruges - Ghent - Sint-Niklaas - Antwerpen
- Intercity services (IC-03) Knokke/Blankenberge - Bruges - Ghent - Brussels - Leuven - Genk
- Intercity services (IC-04) Lille/Poperinge - Kortrijk - Ghent - Sint-Niklaas - Antwerpen
- Intercity services (IC-12) Kortrijk - Ghent - Brussels - Leuven - Liege - Welkenraedt (weekdays)
- Intercity services (IC-12) Kortrijk - Ghent (weekends)
- Intercity services (IC-20) Ghent - Aalst - Brussels - Hasselt - Tongeren (weekdays)
- Intercity services (IC-20) Ghent - Aalst - Brussels - Dendermonde - Lokeren (weekends)
- Intercity services (IC-23A) Bruges - Ghent - Brussels - Brussels Airport
- Intercity services (IC-28) Ghent - Sint-Niklaas - Antwerp (weekdays)
- Local services (L-02) Zeebrugge - Bruges - Ghent - Dendermonde - Mechelen (weekdays)
- Local services (L-02) Zeebrugge - Bruges - Ghent (weekends)
- Local services (L-05) Eeklo - Ghent - Oudenaarde - Ronse
- Local services (L-05) Eeklo - Ghent - Oudenaarde - Kortrijk (weekdays)
- Local services (L-25) Ghent - Zottegem - Geraardsbergen
- Local services (L-28) Ghent - Dendermonde - Mechelen (weekends)

Preceding station	NMBS/SNCB	Following station
Brugge towards Oostende	IC 01	Bruxelles-Midi / Brussel-Zuid towards Eupen
Brugge towards Oostende	IC 02	Gent-Dampoort towards Antwerpen-Centraal
Aalter towards Blankenberge or Knokke	IC 03	Bruxelles-Midi / Brussel-Zuid towards Genk
Waregem towards Lille-Flandres or Poperinge	IC 04	Gent-Dampoort towards Antwerpen-Centraal
De Pinte towards Kortrijk	IC 12 weekdays, except holidays	Bruxelles-Midi / Brussel-Zuid towards Welkenraedt
De Pinte towards Kortrijk	IC 12 weekends	Terminus
Terminus	IC 20 weekdays, except holidays	Merelbeke towards Tongeren
Terminus	IC 20 weekends	Merelbeke towards Lokeren
Aalter towards Brugge	IC 23A	Bruxelles-Midi / Brussel-Zuid towards Brussels National Airport
Terminus	IC 28	Gent-Dampoort towards Antwerpen-Centraal
Drongen towards Zeebrugge-Dorp	L 02 weekdays, except holidays	Merelbeke towards Mechelen
Drongen towards Zeebrugge-Strand	L 02 weekends	Terminus
Gentbrugge towards Eeklo	L 05 weekdays, except holidays	De Pinte towards Ronse or Kortrijk
Gentbrugge towards Eeklo	L 05 weekends	De Pinte towards Ronse
Terminus	L 25	Merelbeke towards Geraardsbergen
Terminus	L 28 weekends	Kwatrecht towards Mechelen

== See also ==
- List of railway stations in Belgium
- Rail transport in Belgium
