= Verviers-Central railway station =

Railway station in Liège, Belgium

Verviers-Central
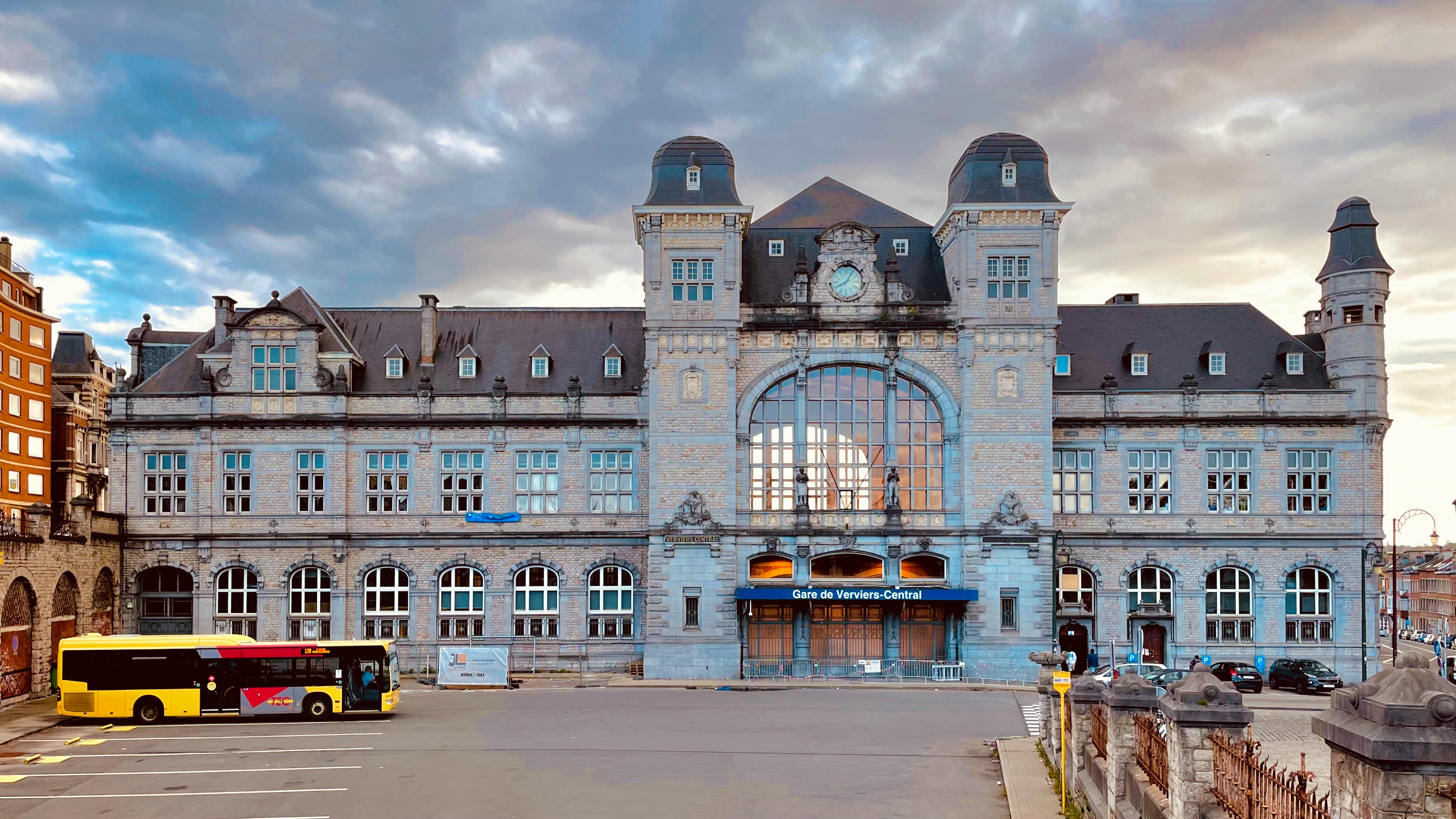
- Verviers-Central railway station

General information
- Location: Verviers, Liège; Belgium
- Coordinates: 50°35′16″N 5°51′16″E
- System: Railway Station
- Owner: SNCB/NMBS
- Operator: SNCB/NMBS
- Line: 37
- Platforms: 5
- Tracks: 5

Other information
- Station code: GV

History
- Opened: 1 February 1930; 96 years ago

Passengers
- 2009: 3,858 per day
Location
- Location within Belgium Location within Europe

Verviers-Central railway station (French: Gare de Verviers-Central; Dutch: Station Verviers-Centraal) (Note: Officially Verviers-Central (French: Verviers-Central; Dutch: Verviers-Centraal)) is a railway station in Verviers, Liège, Belgium. The station opened on 1 February 1930 and is located on railway line 37. The train services are operated by the National Railway Company of Belgium (SNCB/NMBS).

== Train services ==
The station is served by the following services:

- Intercity services (IC-01) Ostend - Bruges - Gent - Brussels - Leuven - Liège - Welkenraedt - Eupen
- Intercity services (IC-12) Kortrijk - Gent - Brussels - Leuven - Liège - Welkenraedt (weekdays)
- Local services (L-09) Spa - Pepinster - Verviers - Welkenraedt - Aachen
- Local services (L-17) Herstal - Liège - Pepinster - Verviers

Preceding station	NMBS/SNCB	Following station
Liège-Guillemins towards Oostende	IC 01	Welkenraedt towards Eupen
Pepinster towards Kortrijk	IC 12 weekdays	Welkenraedt Terminus
Pepinster towards Spa-Géronstère	L 09	Verviers-Palais towards Aachen Hbf
Pepinster towards Herstal	L 17	Terminus

== Gallery ==
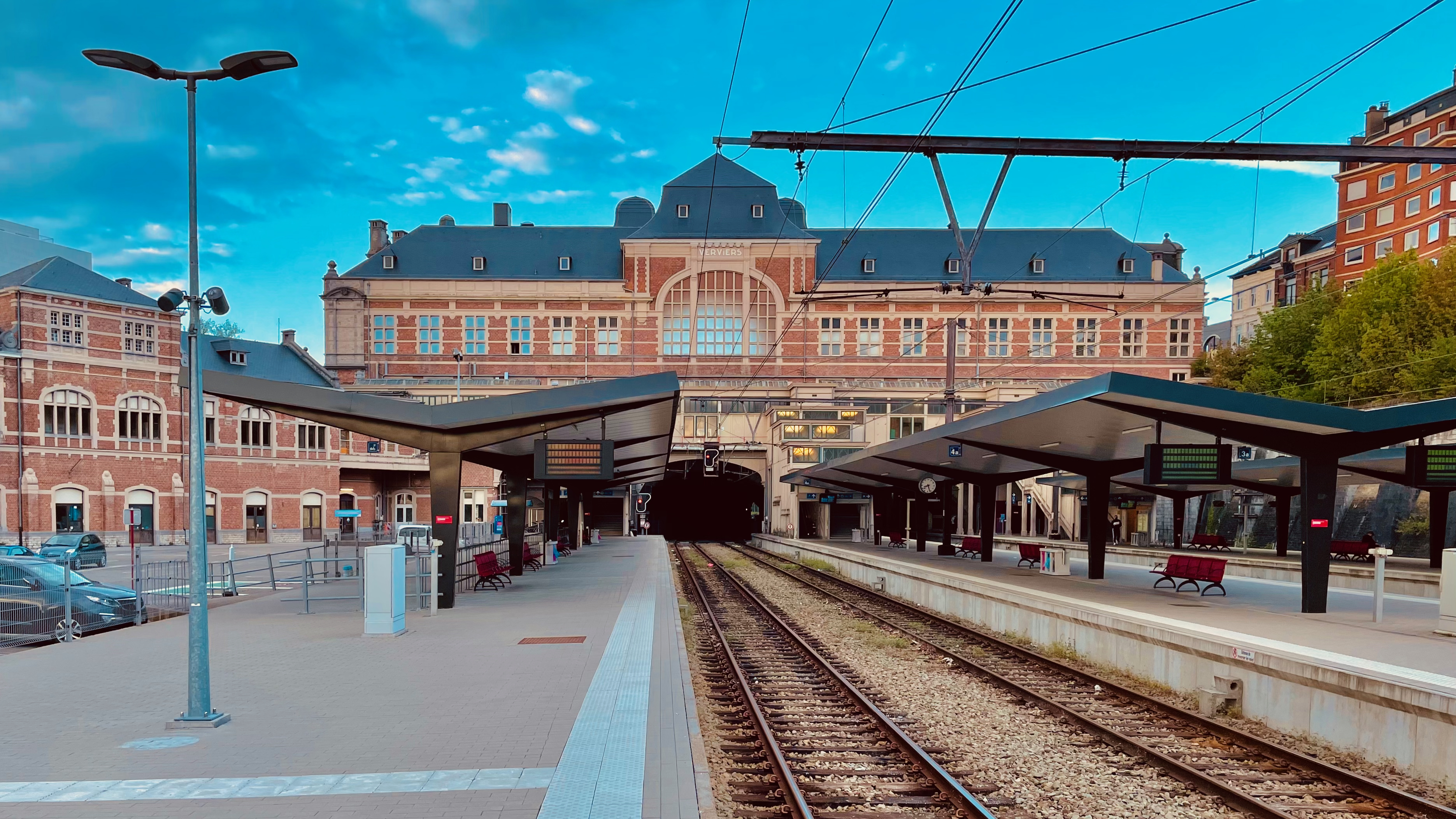
View of the platforms and tracks

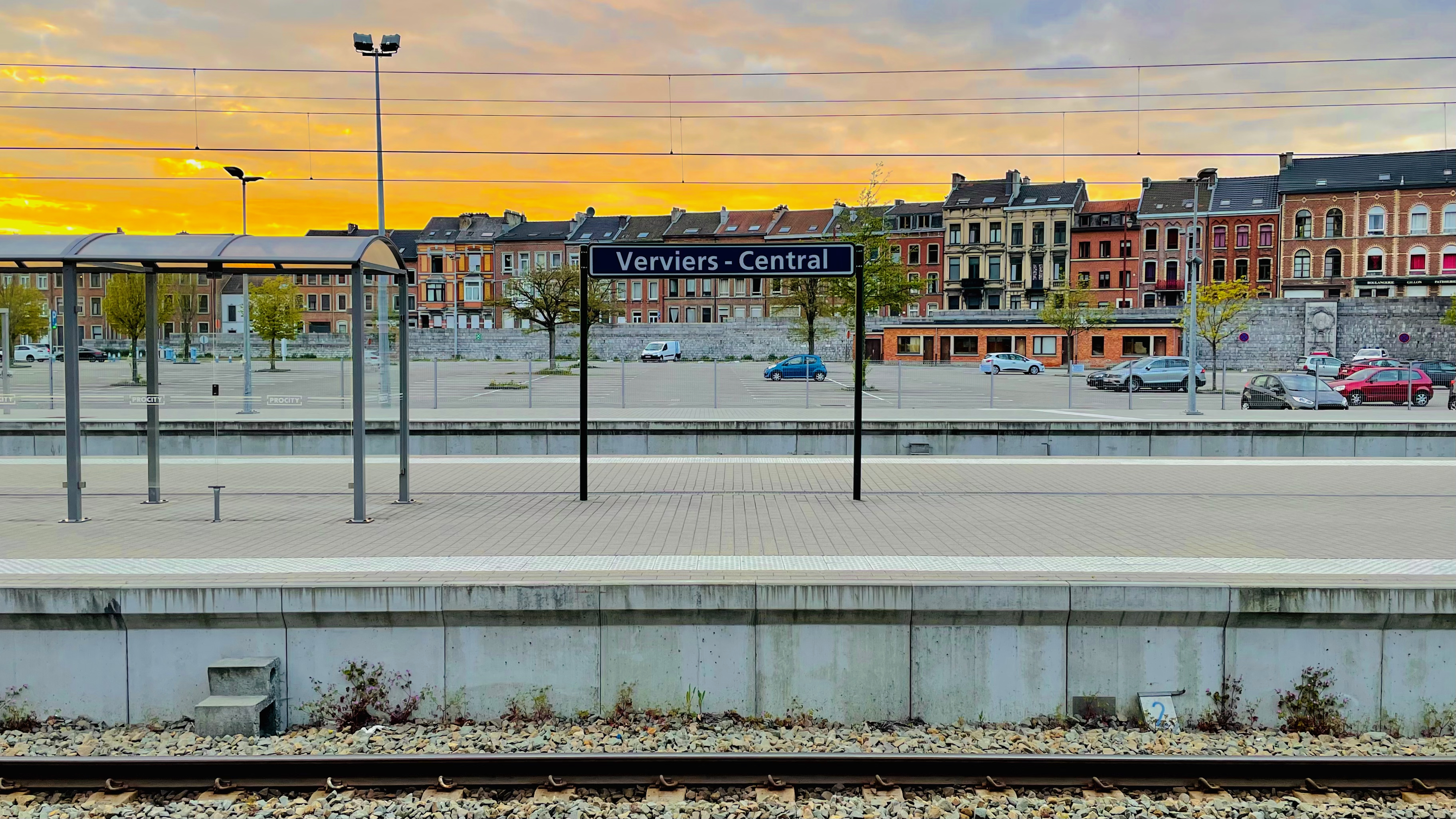
Place name sign on a platform

== See also ==
- List of railway stations in Belgium
- Rail transport in Belgium
