= Youens =

Youens is a surname. Notable people with the surname include:

- Bernard Youens (1914–1984), British actor
- Frederick Youens (1892–1917), British World War I veteran and Victoria Cross recipient
- John Youens (1914–1993), British Anglican priest and army officer
- Laurence Youens (1873–1939), British Roman Catholic bishop
- Peter Youens (1916–2000), British diplomat
- Susan Youens (born 1947), American musicologist
