= Belgian railway line 49 =

Railway line in Belgium

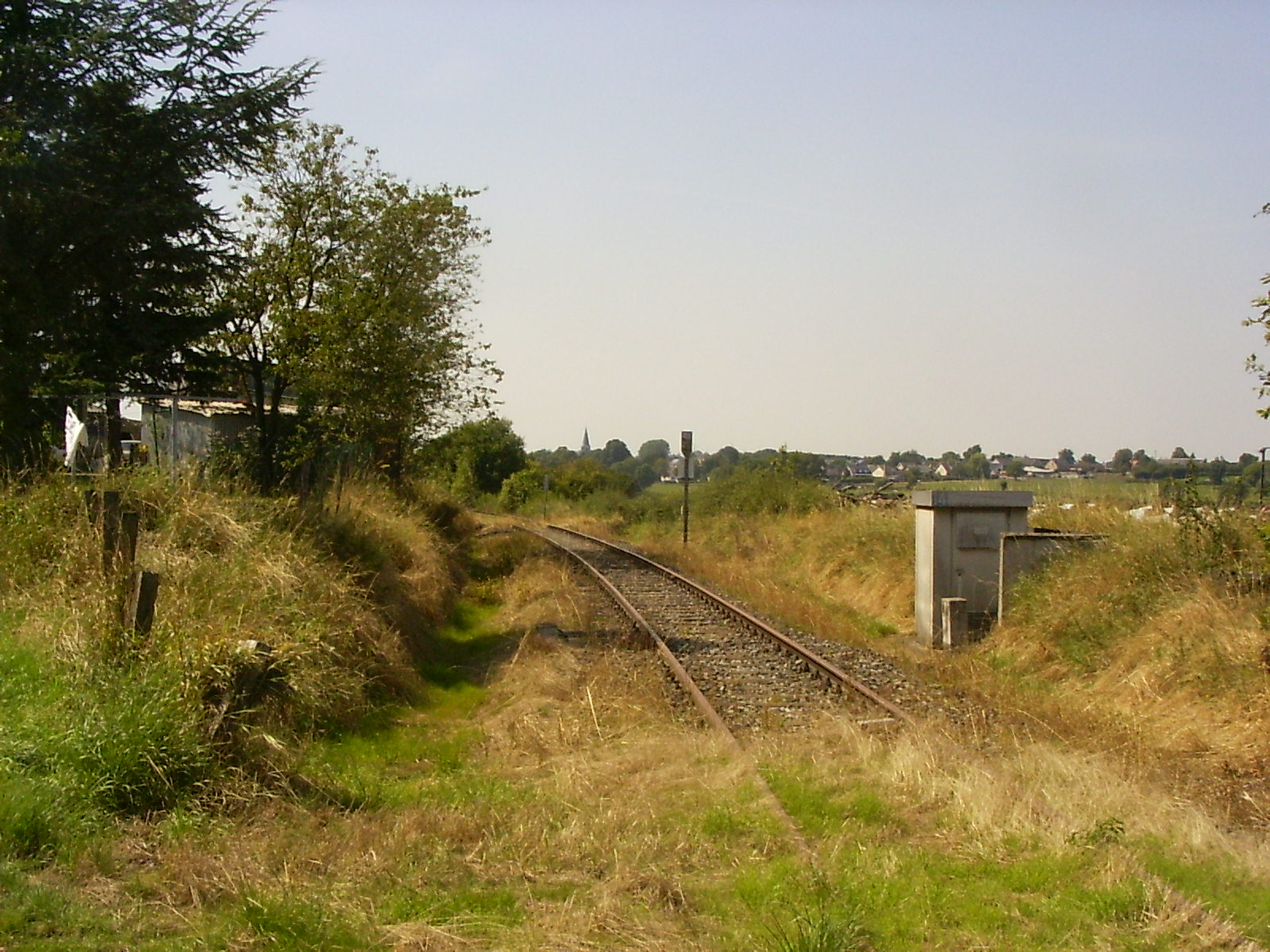
- A level crossing at Busch in 2013, view towards Eupen

Overview
- Status: Operational
- Locale: Belgium
- Termini: Welkenraedt; Eupen

Service
Services
- Operator(s): National Railway Company of Belgium

History
- Opened: Welkenraedt - Eupen: 1 March 1864; Eupen - Raeren: 3 August 1887
- Closed: Eupen - Raeren

Technical
- Line length: 14 km (8.7 mi)
- Number of tracks: single track Welkenraedt - Eupen: 1
- Track gauge: 1,435 mm (4 ft 8 1/2 in) standard gauge
- Electrification: none
- Operating speed: 89 km/h (55 mph)
Route map
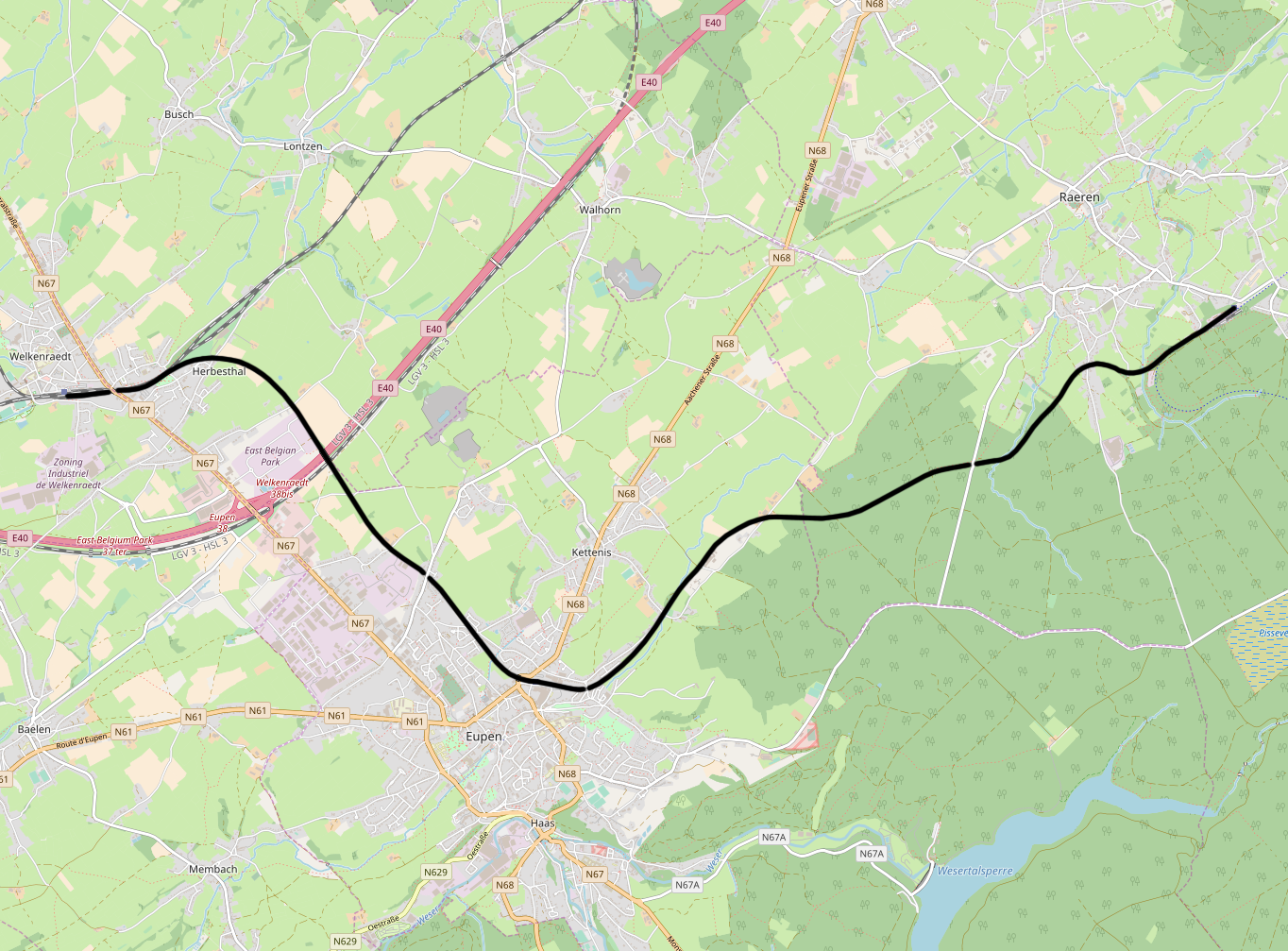

Belgian railway line 49 connects Welkenraedt with Eupen. The line is approximately 14.0-kilometre- long (8.7-mile). In its early days the line also connected to Raeren.
