= Railway Dugouts Burial Ground (Transport Farm) Commonwealth War Graves Commission Cemetery =

WWI CWGC cemetery in Ypres, Belgium

Railway Dugouts (Transport Farm)
- Commonwealth War Graves Commission
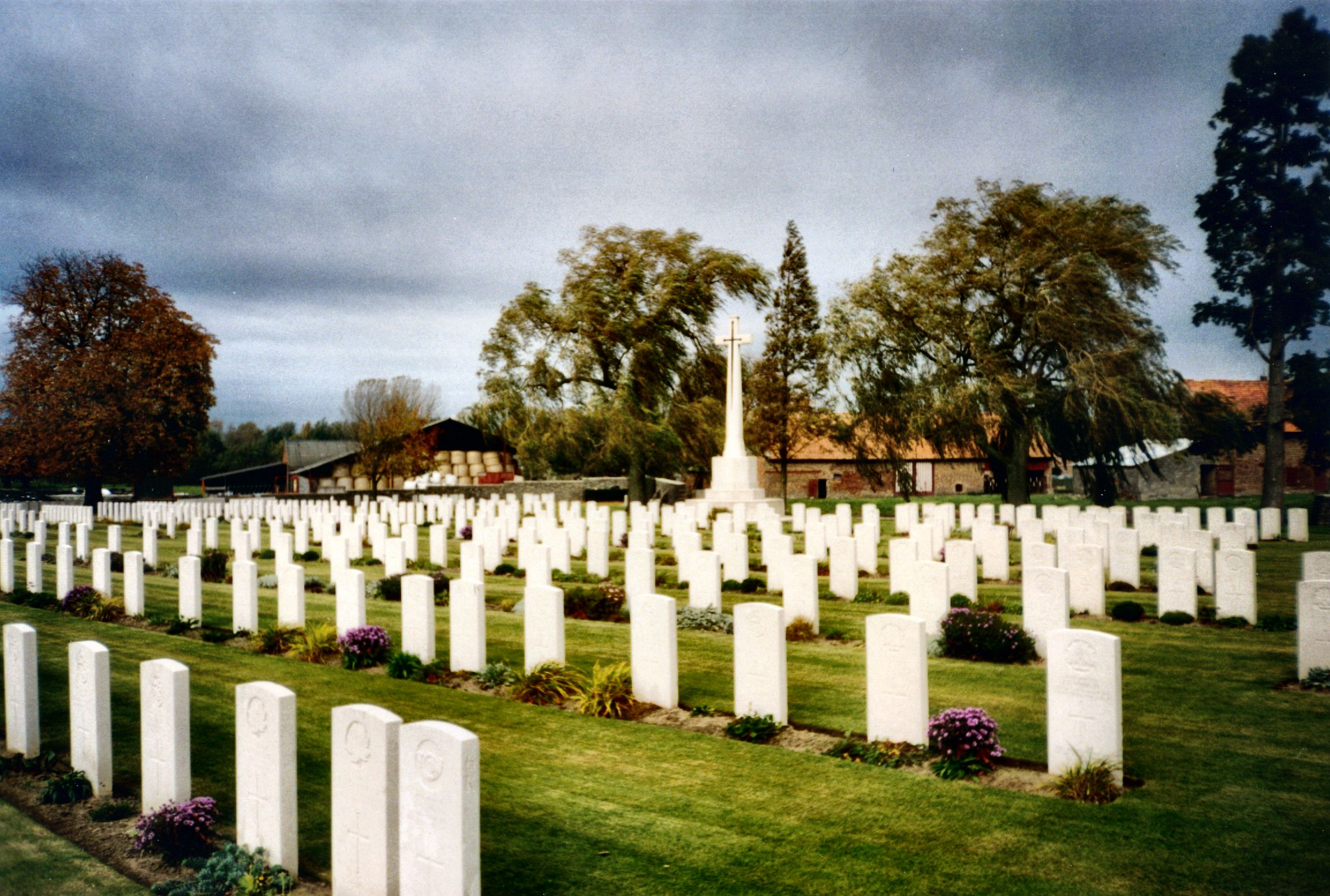
- Used for those deceased 1915–1918
- Established: 1915
- Location: 50°50′05.5″N 02°54′07.4″E near Zillebeke, West Flanders, Belgium
- Designed by: Sir Edwin Lutyens
- Total burials: 2,463, of which 430 are unnamed
- Unknowns: 2

Burials by nation
- Allied Powers: United Kingdom: 1,659; Canada: 636; Australia: 154; New Zealand: 3; Undivided India: 4; British West Indies: 1; Central Powers: Germany: 3

Burials by war
- World War I: 2,463
- Statistics source: www.wo1.be and Battlefields 14-18

Railway Dugouts Burial Ground (Transport Farm) is a Commonwealth War Graves Commission (CWGC) burial ground for the dead of the First World War located in the Ypres Salient on the Western Front.

The cemetery grounds were assigned to the United Kingdom in perpetuity by King Albert I of Belgium in recognition of the sacrifices made by the British Empire in the defence and liberation of Belgium during the war.

== Foundation ==
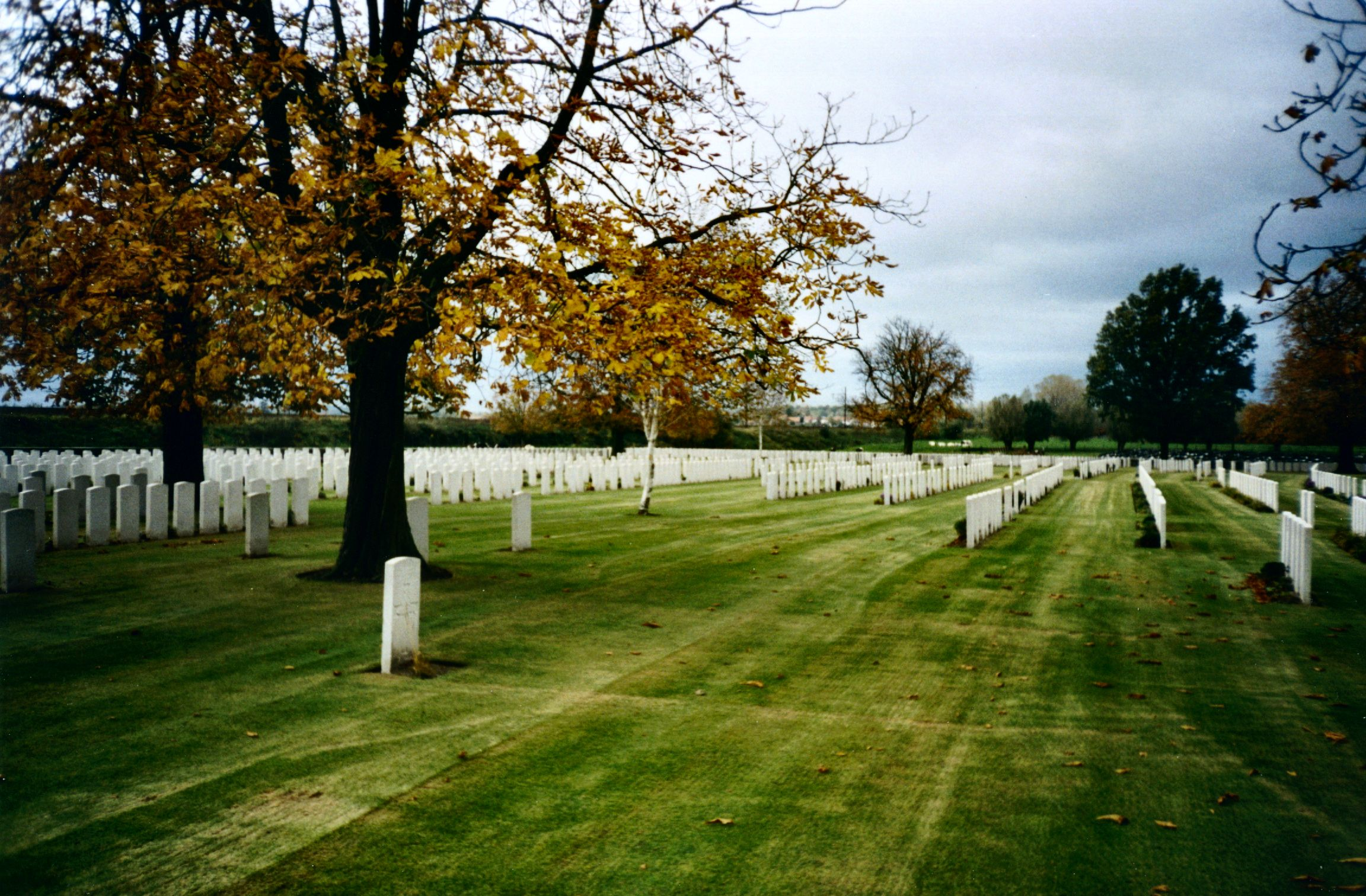
Railway Dugouts Commonwealth War Graves Commission cemetery

The cemetery was founded by Commonwealth troops in April 1915 and remained in use until the Armistice in November 1918, with peak usage in 1916 and 1917 due to the presence of Advanced Dressing Stations that were dug into the nearby railway embankment near Ieper railway station. The site was enlarged after the Armistice with the concentration of battlefield graves.

The cemetery contains special memorials to soldiers buried in the Valley Cottages Cemetery in Zillebeke, which was destroyed in fighting and the graves and bodies lost. These headstones carry (unless replaced by a personalised family message) the inscription at the foot of the stone "Their Glory Shall Not Be Blotted Out" – a line devised by Rudyard Kipling.

There is also a special memorial to a single officer from Transport Farm Annexe cemetery, which was concentrated into Perth (China Wall) Commonwealth War Graves Commission Cemetery, whose grave was not found.

The cemetery was designed by Sir Edwin Lutyens who was also responsible for the Cenotaph in Whitehall, London and the Thiepval Memorial on the Somme, France.

== Notable graves ==
The cemetery contains the graves of some 2,463 soldiers. Amongst these is the grave of Second Lieutenant Frederick Youens who was posthumously awarded the Victoria Cross for bravery, having picked up an enemy grenade with the intention of throwing it away from his position when it detonated in his hand. He died from his wounds later that day, 7 July 1917.

== Gallery ==
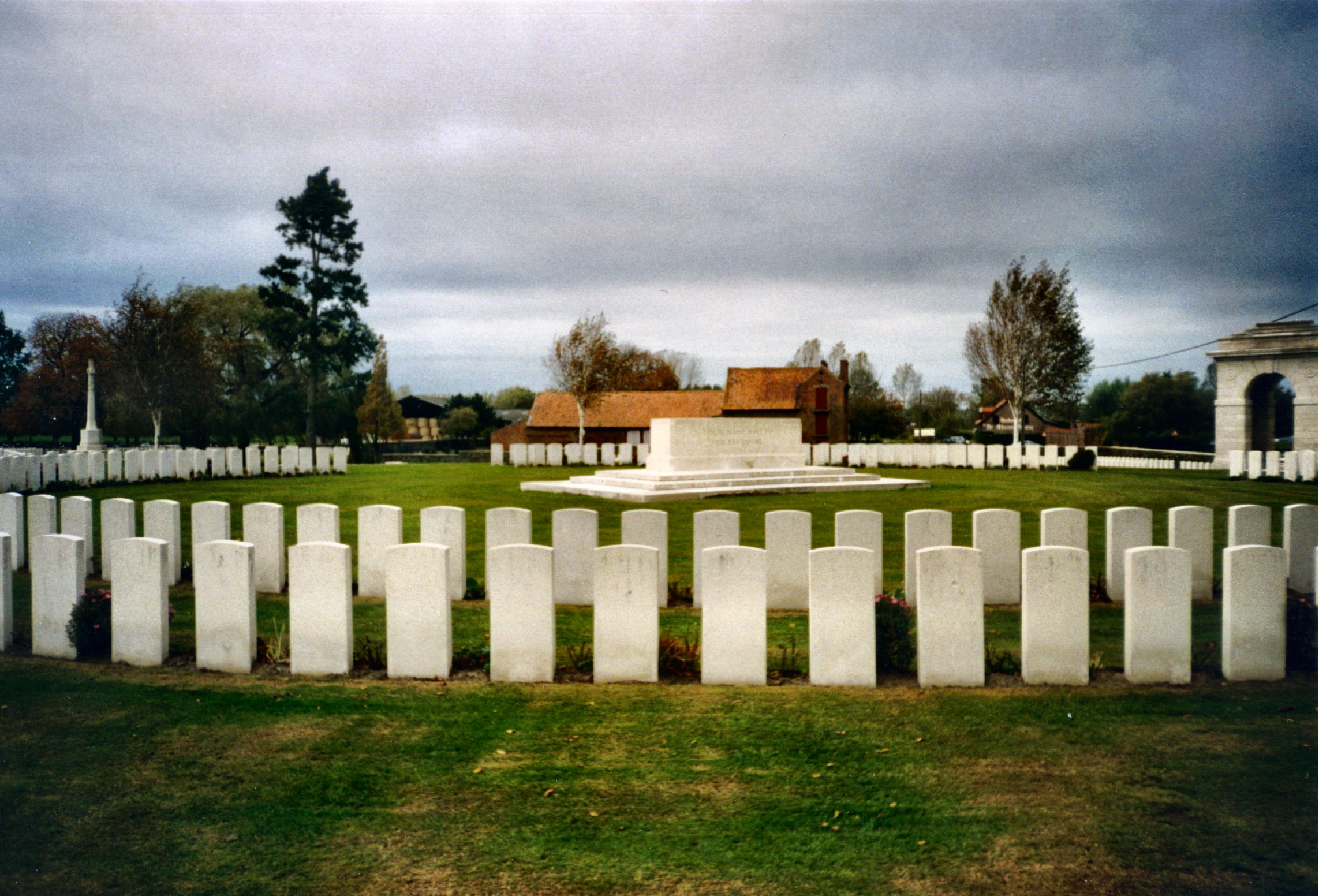
Railway Dugouts Commonwealth War Graves Commission cemetery

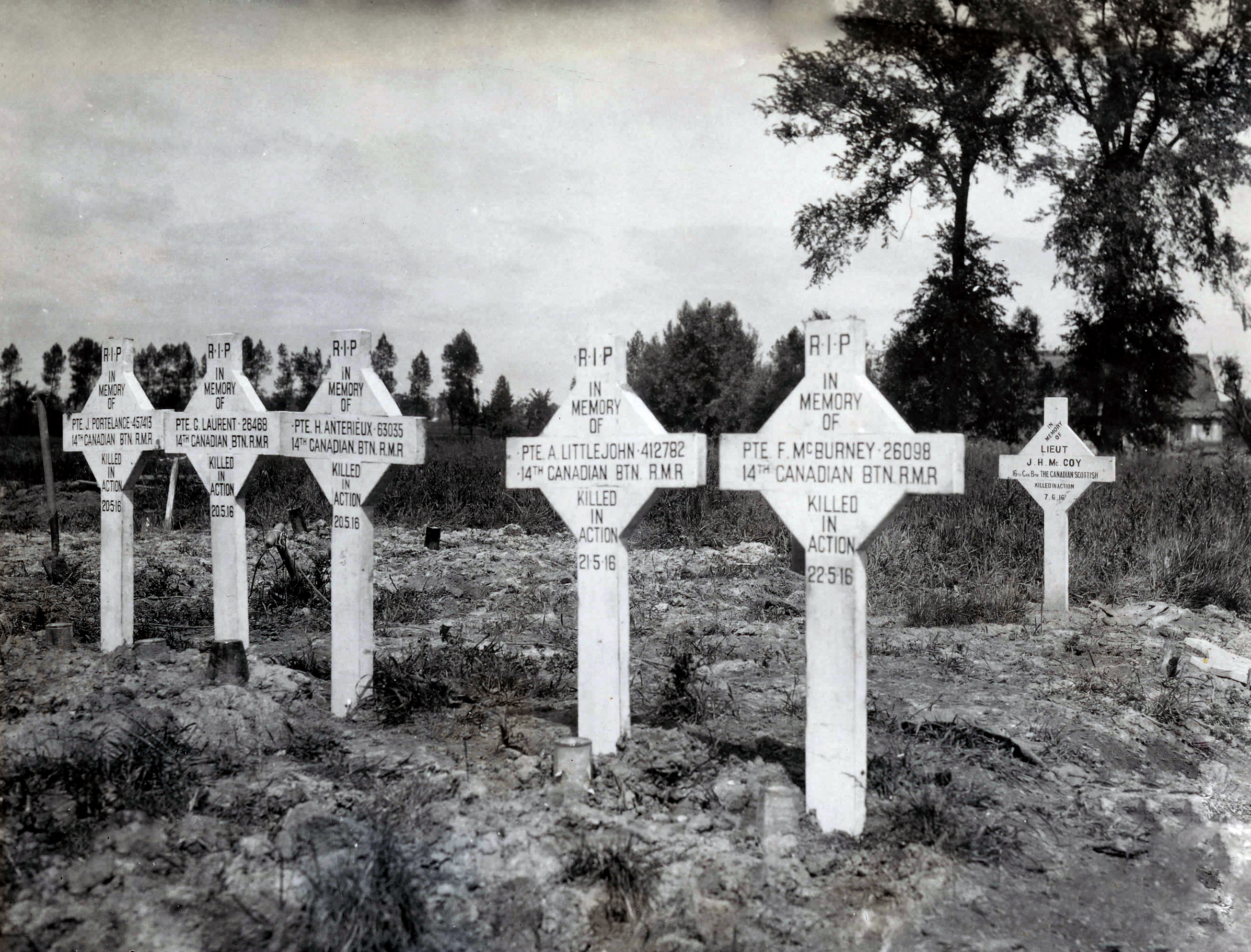
Wartime appearance of Canadian graves in what would become Railway Dugouts Burial Ground Transport Farm, 1916.
