= Ieper railway station =

Railway station in West Flanders, Belgium

Ieper
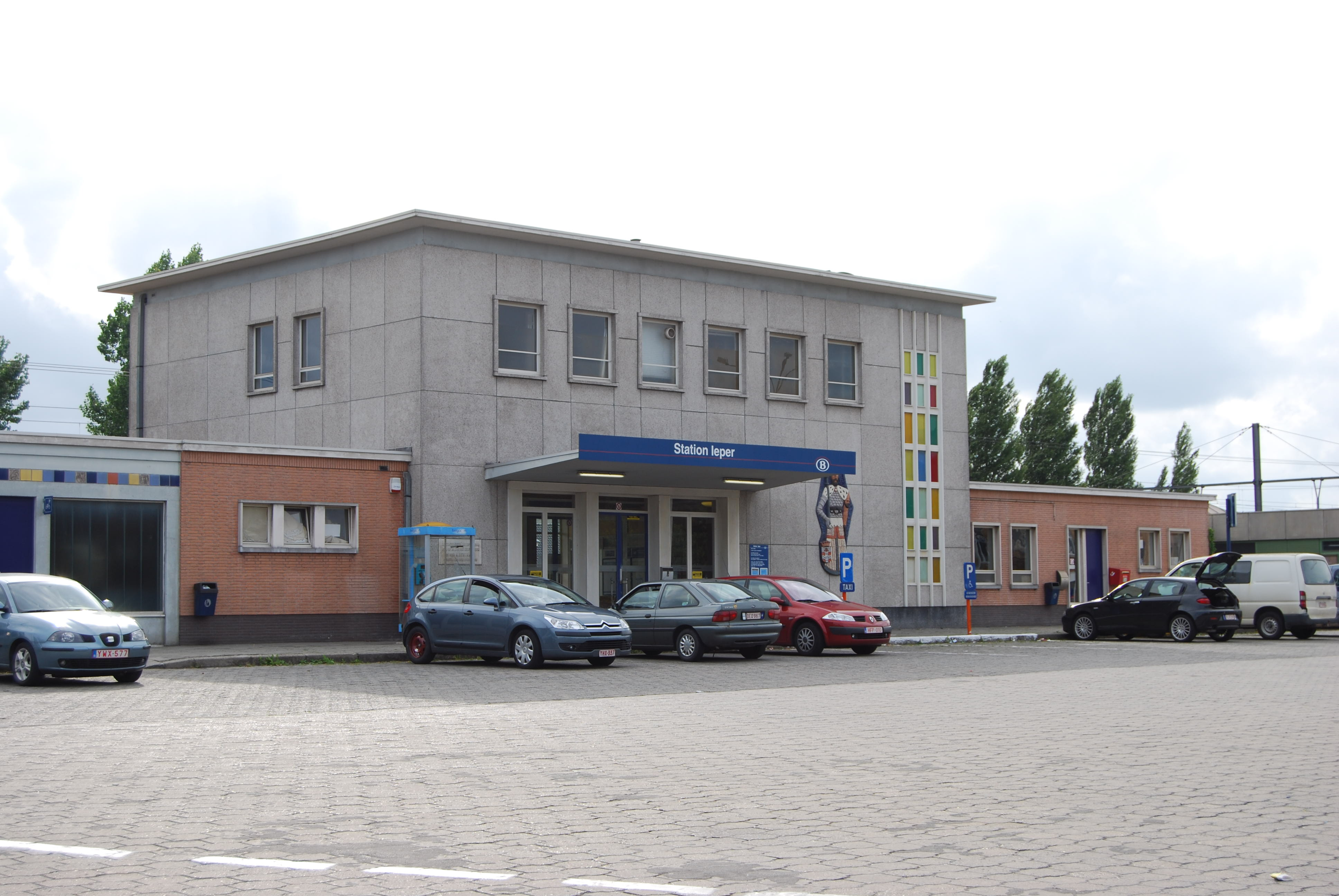
- Ieper railway station

General information
- Location: Ypres; Belgium
- Coordinates: 50°50′52″N 2°52′36″E
- System: Railway Station
- Owner: NMBS/SNCB
- Operator: NMBS/SNCB
- Line: 69
- Platforms: 3
- Tracks: 3

History
- Opened: 1 January 1854; 172 years ago
- Electrified: 3Kv DC overhead
Location
- Location within Belgium Location within Europe

Ieper railway station (Dutch: Station Ieper; French: Gare d'Ypres) (Note: Officially Ieper (Dutch: Ieper; French: Ypres)) is a railway station in Ypres (Dutch: Ieper) in West Flanders, Belgium. The station was opened in 1854, during the reign of King Leopold I. It is located on railway line 69 from Kortrijk to Poperinge. The train services are operated by the National Railway Company of Belgium (NMBS/SNCB).

== Train services ==
The station is served by the following services:

- Intercity services (IC-04) Poperinge - Kortrijk - Ghent - Sint-Niklaas - Antwerp

Preceding station	NMBS/SNCB	Following station
Poperinge Terminus	IC 04	Komen towards Antwerpen-Centraal

== In Flanders Fields ==
The station is near the Menin Gate and other places associated with the First World War, with British and Commonwealth war graves located alongside the line from the Kortrijk direction, known as Railway Dugouts Burial Ground (Transport Farm) Commonwealth War Graves Commission Cemetery.

== Gallery ==
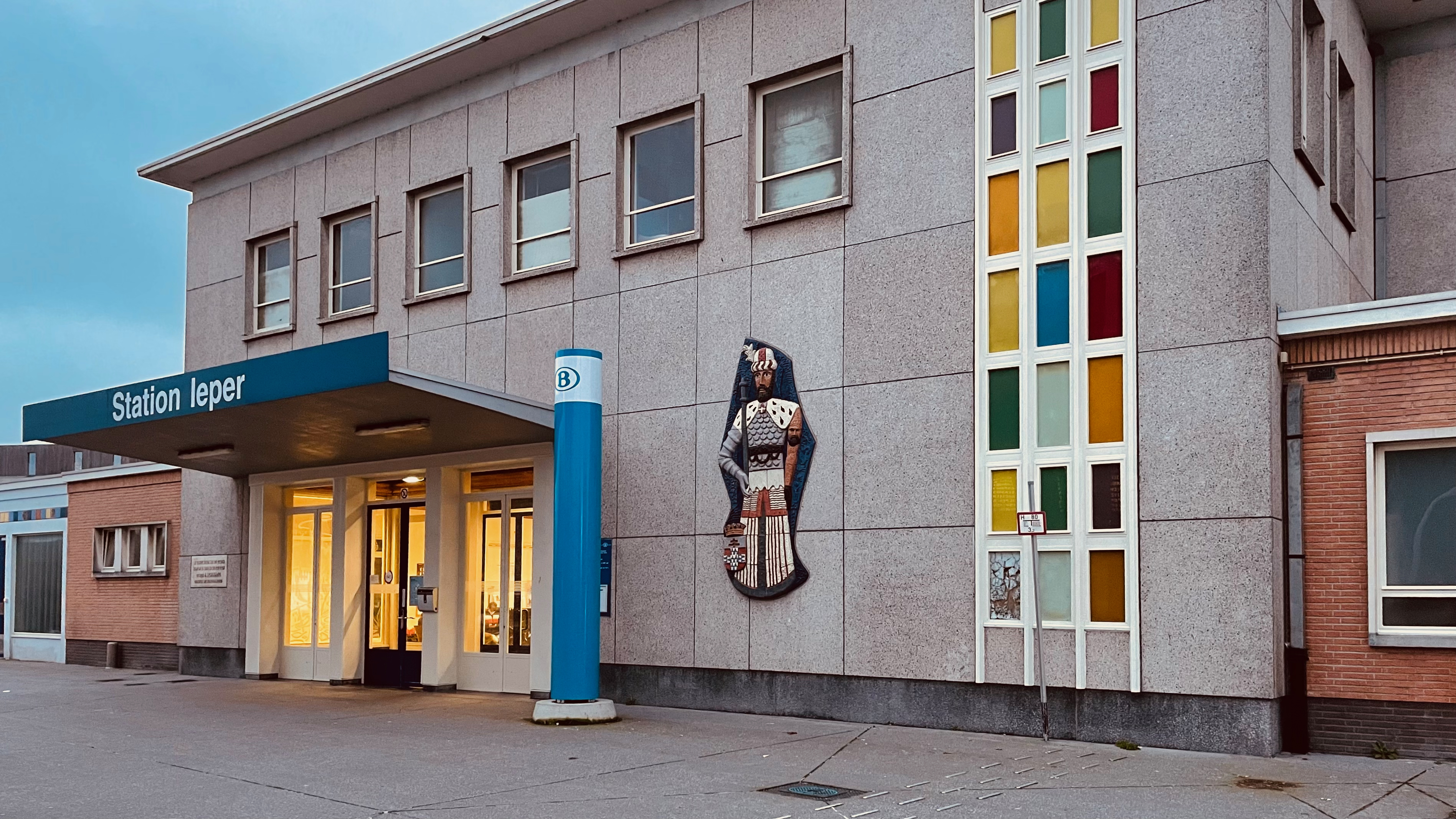
Frontal view

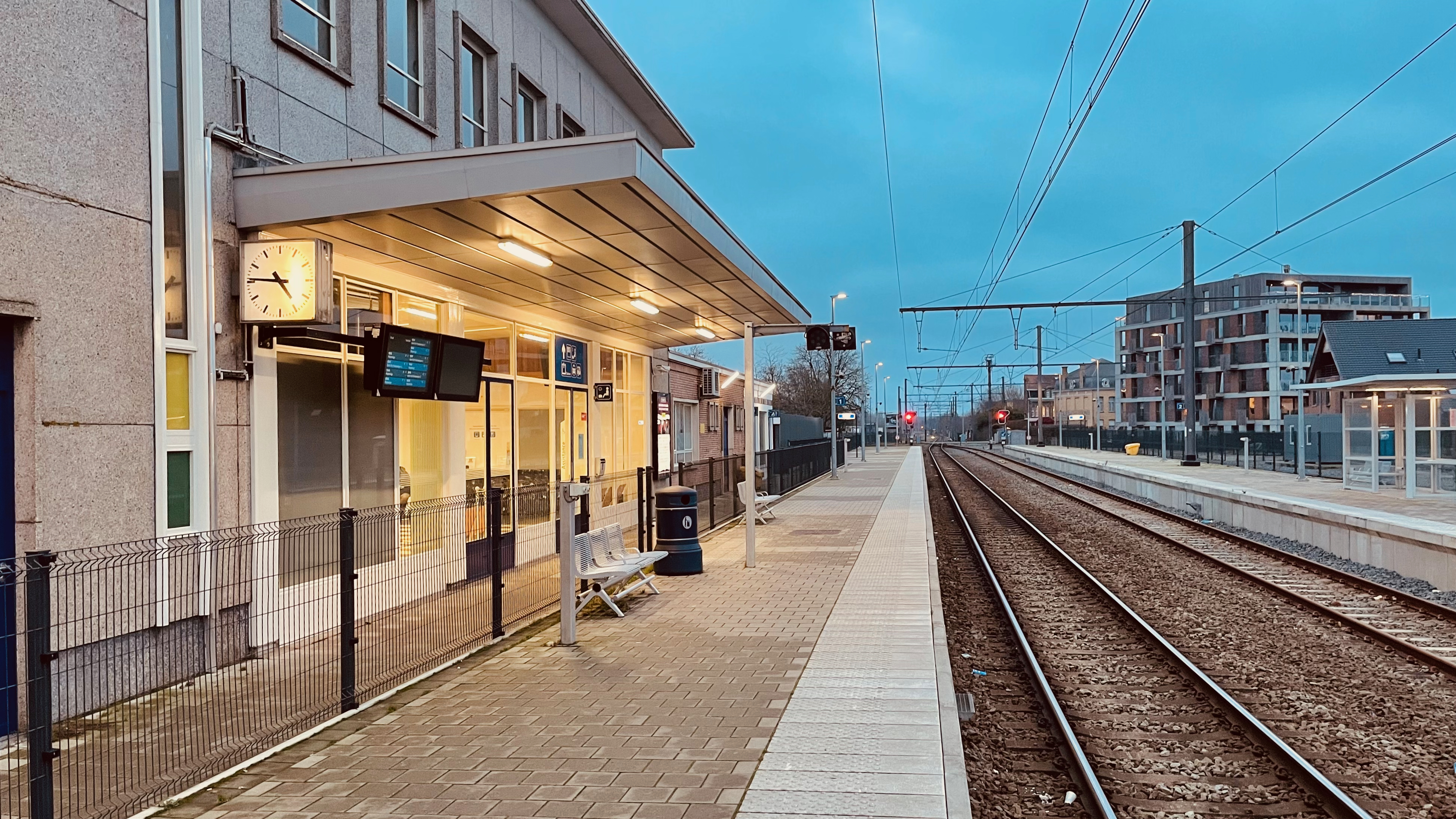
View of the platforms and tracks

== See also ==
- List of railway stations in Belgium
- Rail transport in Belgium
