= Frederick Youens =

Recipient of the Victoria Cross

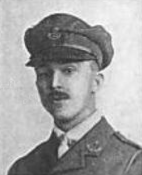
- Born: 14 August 1892; High Wycombe, Buckinghamshire, England
- Died: 7 July 1917 (aged 24) near Ypres, Belgium
- Burial place: Railway Dugouts Burial Ground
- Military career
- Allegiance: United Kingdom
- Branch: British Army
- Service years: 1914–1917
- Rank: Second Lieutenant
- Units: Royal Army Medical Corps; East Surrey Regiment; Durham Light Infantry
- Conflicts: World War I: Battle of Hill 60 †
- Awards: Victoria Cross

Frederick Youens VC (14 August 1892 – 7 July 1917) was an English recipient of the Victoria Cross, the highest and most prestigious award for gallantry in the face of the enemy that can be awarded to British and Commonwealth forces.

== Details ==
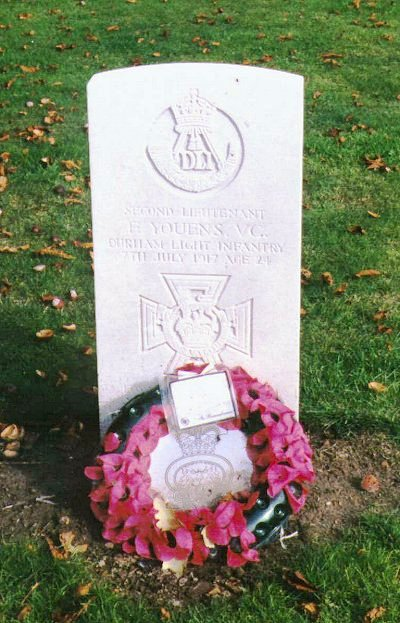
Grave of Frederick Youens at the Railway Dugouts Burial Ground in Zillebeke

He was twenty four years old, and a temporary second lieutenant in the 13th Battalion, The Durham Light Infantry, British Army during the First World War when the following deed took place for which he was awarded the VC.

On 7 July 1917 near Hill 60, Belgium, it was reported that the enemy were preparing to raid the British trenches and Second Lieutenant Youens, who had already been wounded, immediately set out to rally a Lewis gun team which had become disorganised. While doing this an enemy bomb fell on the Lewis gun position without exploding. The second lieutenant picked it up and hurled it over the parapet, but soon after another bomb fell near the same place and again he picked it up, but it exploded in his hand, severely wounding him and some of his men. The officer later succumbed to his wounds.

== Further information ==
Buried at Railway Dugouts Burial Ground, Belgium, 2 miles (3 kilometres) south east of Ypres. Plot I. Row O. Grave three.

Notable alumnus of the Royal Grammar School, High Wycombe.

== The medal ==
His Victoria Cross is displayed at the Durham Light Infantry Museum and Durham Art Gallery, Durham City, England.
