= Belgian railway line 75 =

Railway line in Belgium

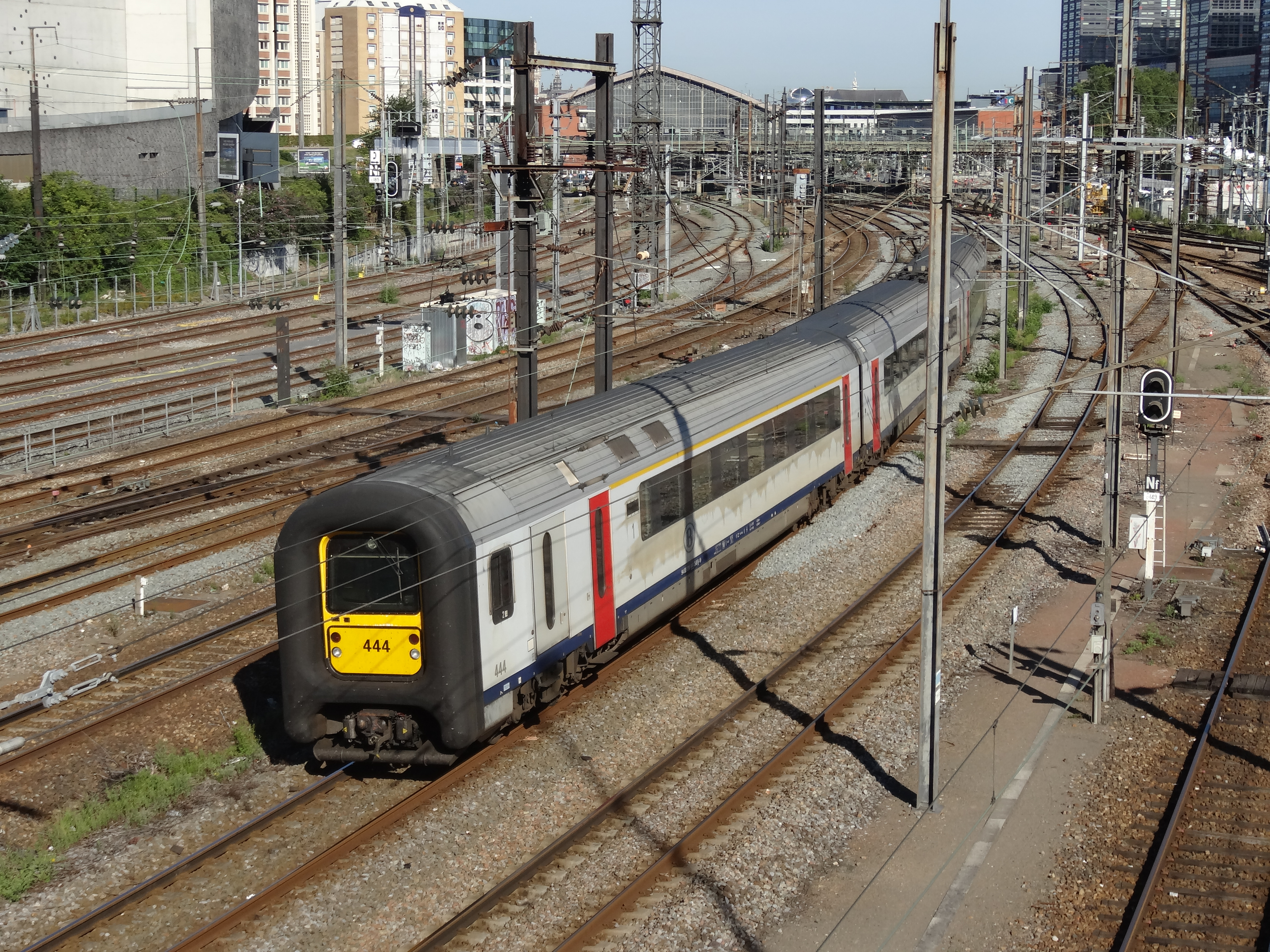
- NMBS/SNCB train approaching Gare de Lille Flandres.

Overview
- Status: Operational
- Locale: Belgium
- Termini: Gent-Sint-Pieters railway station; French border near Mouscron

Service
Services
- Operator(s): National Railway Company of Belgium

History
- Opened: 1839–1842

Technical
- Line length: 57 km (35 mi) (Belgian part)
- Number of tracks: double track
- Track gauge: 1,435 mm (4 ft 8 1/2 in) standard gauge
- Electrification: 3 kV DC
Route map
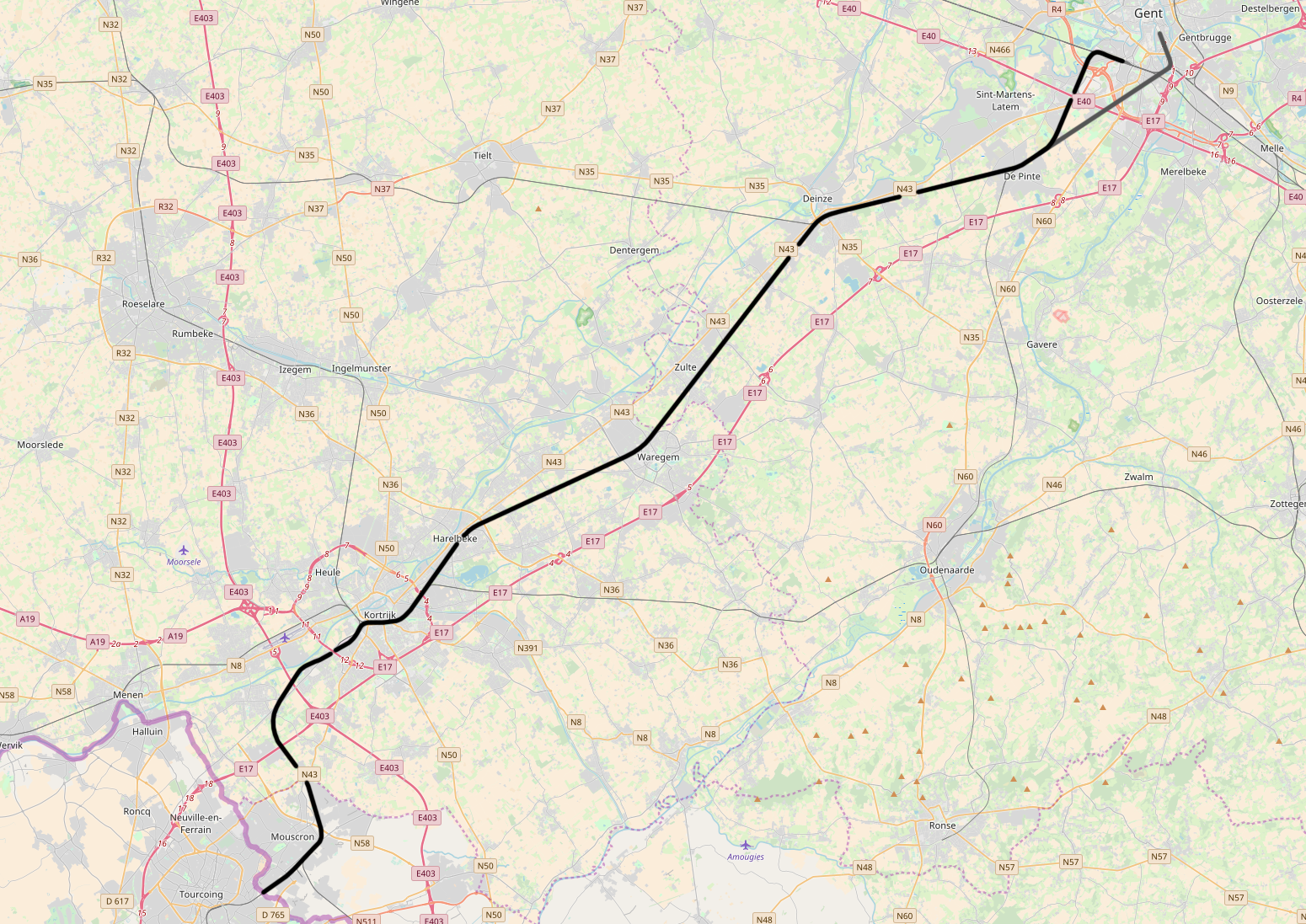

The Belgian railway line 75 is a railway line in Belgium connecting Ghent with Kortrijk and the French border near Mouscron. It was opened between 1839 and 1842. Beyond Mouscron the line continues onto Gare Lille Flandres in the French city of Lille.

== Stations ==
The main interchange stations on line 75 are:

- Gent-Sint-Pieters: to Antwerp, Brussels, Bruges, Oudenaarde and Eeklo
- Deinze: to De Panne
- Kortrijk: to Bruges, Oudenaarde and Ypres
- Mouscron: to Tournai
