= Welkenraedt railway station =

Railway station in Liège, Belgium

Welkenraedt
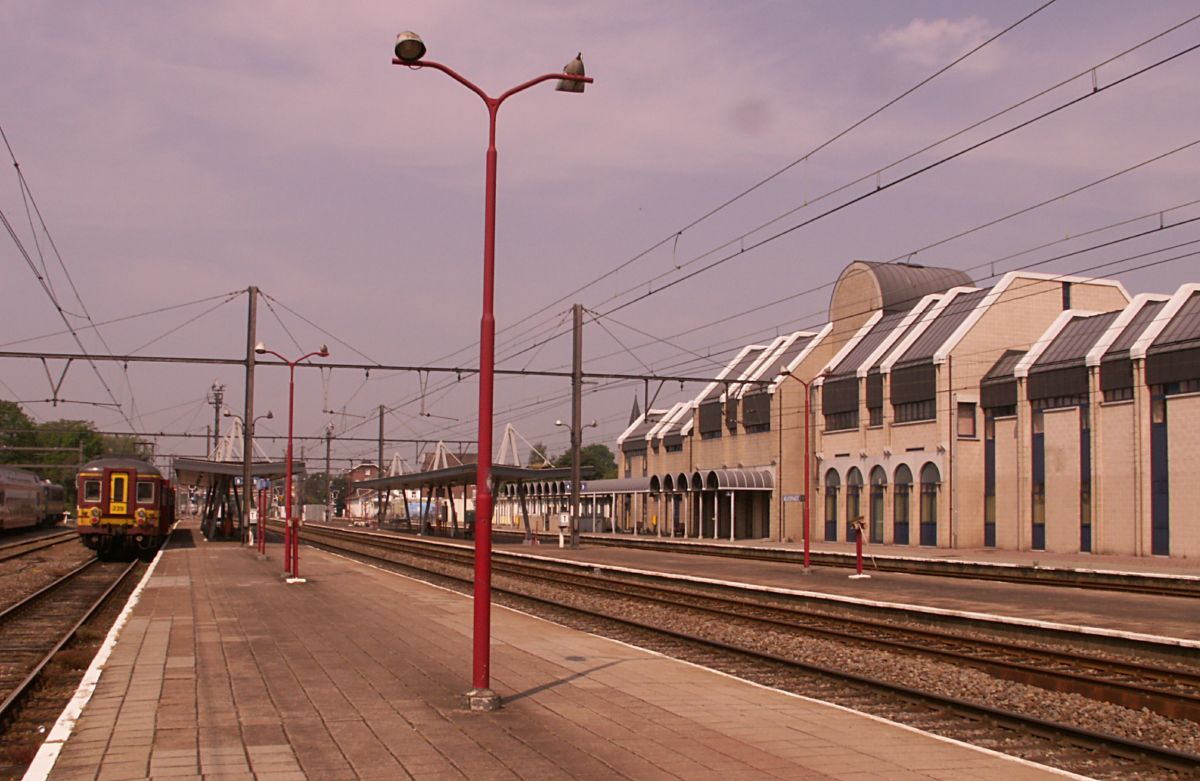
- Welkenraedt railway station

General information
- Location: Welkenraedt, Liège; Belgium
- Coordinates: 50°39′33″N 5°58′32″E
- System: Railway Station
- Owner: Infrabel
- Operator: National Railway Company of Belgium
- Lines: 37, 39 and 49
- Platforms: 5
- Tracks: 8

Other information
- Station code: GWK

History
- Opened: 24 October 1843

Passengers
- 2009: 1256 per day
Location

Welkenraedt is a railway station in the town of Welkenraedt, Liège, Belgium. The station opened on 24 October 1843 and is located on lines 37, 39 and 49. Passenger services are operated by the National Railway Company of Belgium (NMBS/SNCB).

== Train services ==
The station is served by the following services:

- Intercity services (IC-01) Ostend - Bruges - Gent - Brussels - Leuven - Liège - Welkenraedt - Eupen
- Intercity services (IC-12) Kortrijk - Gent - Brussels - Leuven - Liège - Welkenraedt (weekdays)
- Local services (L-09) Spa - Pepinster - Verviers - Welkenraedt - Aachen

Preceding station	NMBS/SNCB	Following station
Verviers-Central towards Oostende	IC 01	Eupen Terminus
Verviers-Central towards Kortrijk	IC 12 weekdays	Terminus
Dolhain-Gileppe towards Spa-Géronstère	L 09	Hergenrath towards Aachen Hbf

== See also ==
- List of railway stations in Belgium
