= Eupen railway station =

Railway station in Liège, Belgium

Eupen
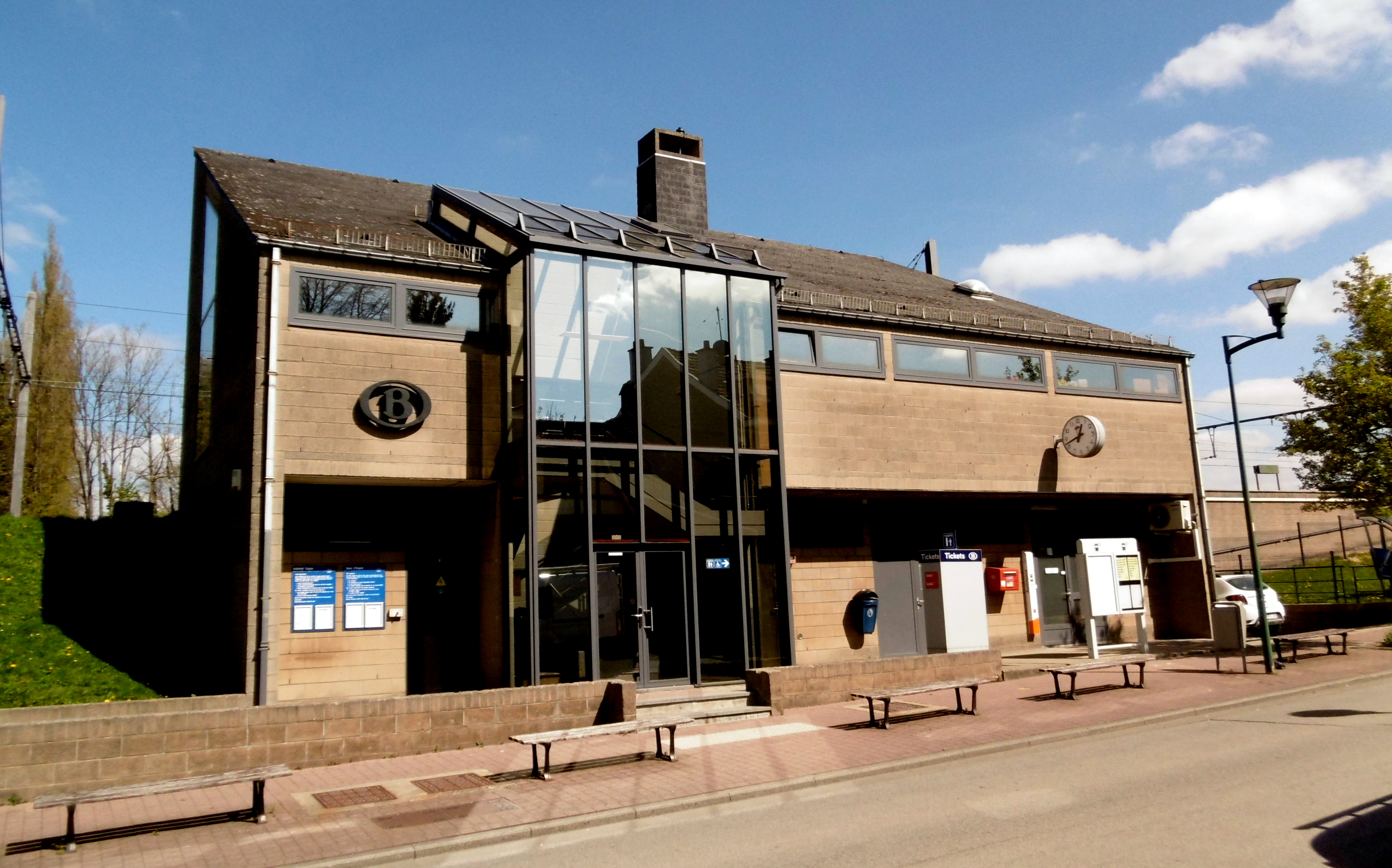

General information
- Location: Bahnhofstraße, Eupen
- Coordinates: 50°38′6″N 6°2′20″E
- System: Railway Station
- Owner: National Railway Company of Belgium
- Line: 49
- Platforms: 2
- Tracks: 2 + 1 for passing trains to Raeren

Other information
- Station code: REP

History
- Opened: 1 March 1864
- Rebuilt: 3 June 1984

Passengers
- 2009: 143936

Services
Preceding station	NMBS/SNCB	Following station
Welkenraedt towards Oostende	IC 01	Terminus
Location

Eupen is a railway station in Eupen, Liège, Belgium. The station opened on 1 March 1864 on the Line 49. The train services are operated by NMBS/SNCB.

== Train services ==
The following service currently serve the station:

- Intercity services (IC-01) Ostend - Bruges - Gent - Brussels - Leuven - Liege - Welkenraedt - Eupen
