= Belgian railway line 59 =

Railway line in Belgium

Overview
- Status: Operational
- Locale: Belgium
- Termini: Antwerpen-Berchem railway station; Gent-Dampoort railway station

Service
- Operator(s): National Railway Company of Belgium

History
- Opened: 1844-1970

Technical
- Line length: 56 km (35 mi)
- Number of tracks: double track
- Track gauge: 1,435 mm (4 ft 8 1/2 in) standard gauge
- Electrification: 3 kV DC
Route map
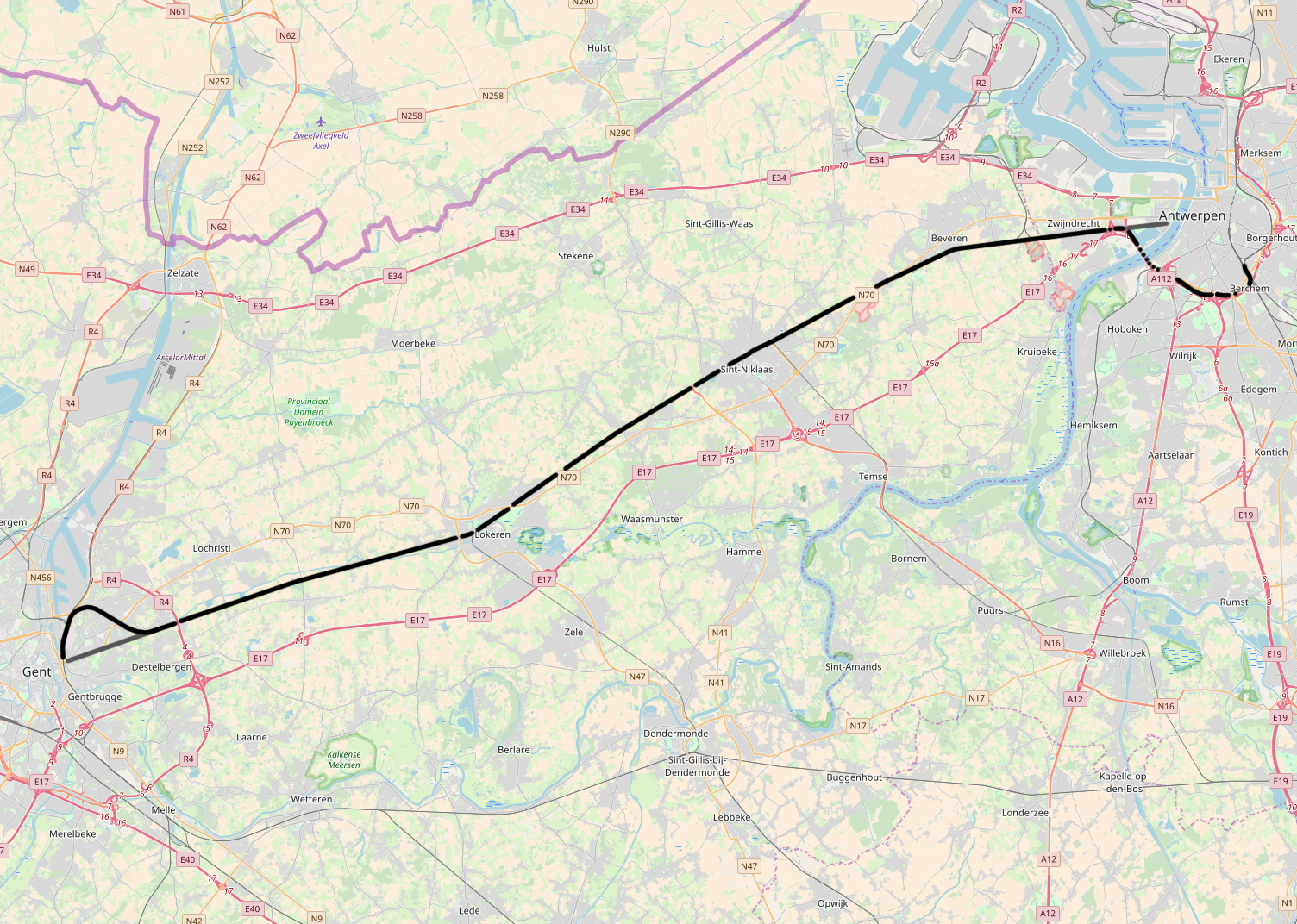

The Belgian railway line 59 is a railway line in Belgium connecting Antwerp with Ghent. It was opened between 1844 and 1847. Until 1970, the eastern terminus of the railway was a station on the left bank of the river Scheldt, opposite the city centre of Antwerp. Since 1970, the railway is connected to Antwerp central station by a rail tunnel under the Scheldt. The total length of the line between Antwerpen-Berchem and Gent-Dampoort (the section between Gent-Dampoort and Gent-Sint-Pieters is part of line 58 Ghent – Eeklo) is 55.8 km.

== Stations ==
The main interchange stations on line 59 are:

- Antwerpen-Berchem: to Antwerp, Roosendaal, Lier and Brussels
- Sint-Niklaas: to Mechelen
- Lokeren: to Dendermonde
- Gent-Dampoort: to Gent-Sint-Pieters and Eeklo
