= Poperinge railway station =

Railway station in West Flanders, Belgium

Poperinge
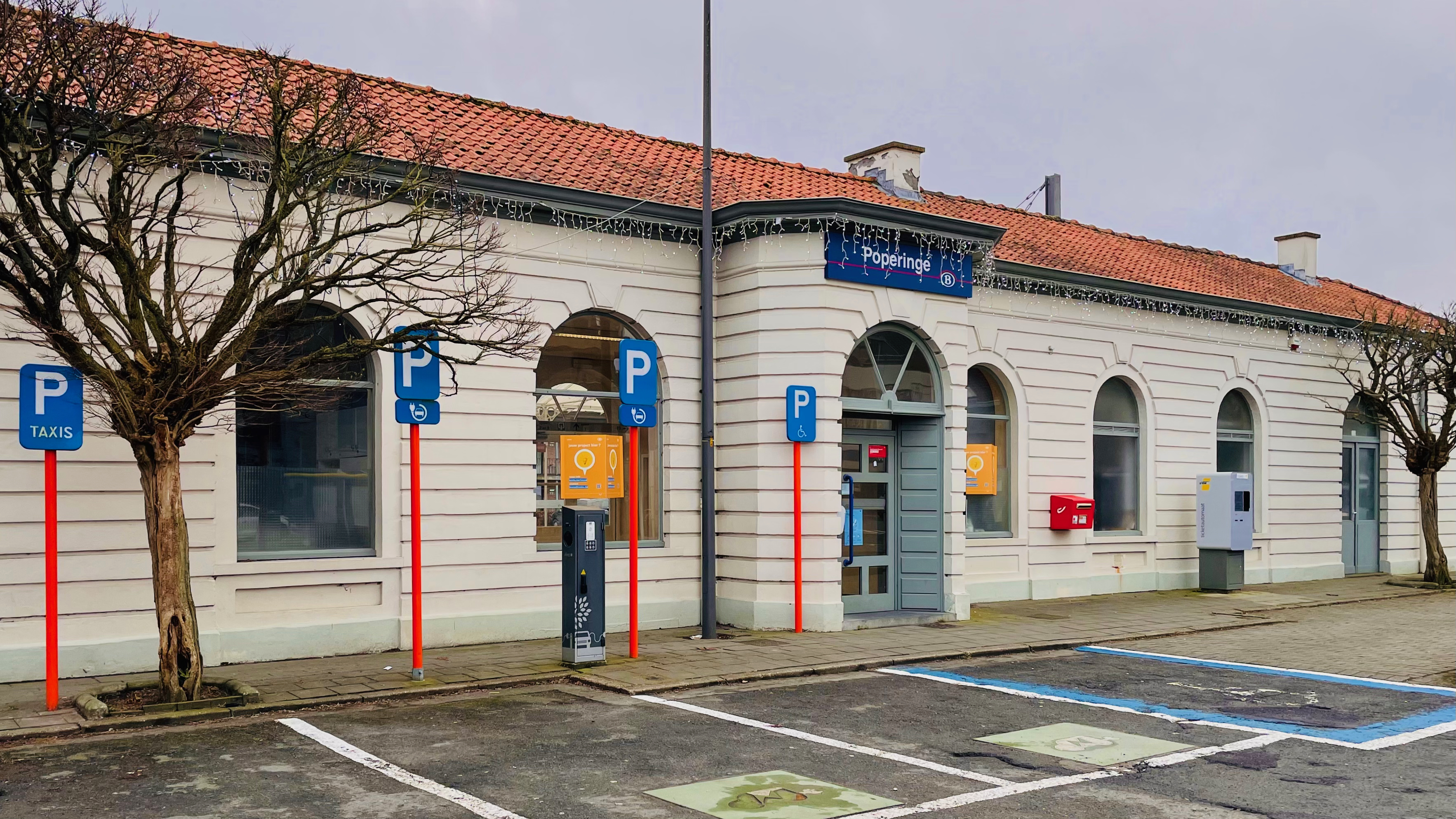
- Poperinge railway station in 2021

General information
- Location: Poperinge; Belgium
- Coordinates: 50°50′52″N 2°52′36″E
- Owner: NMBS/SNCB
- Operator: NMBS/SNCB
- Line: 69
- Platforms: 2
- Tracks: 3

History
- Opened: 20 March 1854; 172 years ago
- Electrified: 3kV DC overhead
Location
- Location within Belgium Location within Europe

Poperinge railway station (Dutch: Station Poperinge; French: Gare de Poperinge) is a railway station in West Flanders, Belgium, serving the city of Poperinge. It is the western terminus of Belgian railway line 69, serving stations to and from Kortrijk. Services are operated by the National Railway Company of Belgium (NMBS/SNCB).

== History ==
The station was opened on 20 March 1854 by the Société des chemins de fer de la Flandre-Occidentale (FO) with the extension from Ypres. The line went as far as Hazebrouck across the border in France. Poperinge became the passenger terminus of the line in 1950 when services were withdrawn from Abele, though international services continued to Hazebrouck until 1954. Freight to Abele was withdrawn in 1970 and the track removed by 1972.

The station also used to serve Belgian railway line 76 to Adinkerke-De Panne. The line was built during the First World War by the Belgian and British Armies to supply the Yser Front. The railway was later closed and dismantled during the Second World War by order of the occupying German forces.

== Station facilities ==
The station has a car park which includes four designated spaces for people of reduced mobility. It also has a bicycle hire scheme operated by Blue-Bikes. Tickets are purchased from ticket vending machines. Other facilities include a connecting bus stop, a taxi rank, as well as free toilets. The station is accessible for travellers with reduced mobility.

== Train services ==
The station is served by hourly trains to Antwerp Centraal. Inbound trains from Antwerp split at Kortrijk, to also serve the line to Lille-Flandres.

- Intercity services (IC-04) Poperinge - Kortrijk - Ghent - Sint-Niklaas - Antwerp

| Preceding station | NMBS/SNCB | Following station |
|---|---|---|
| Terminus | IC 04 | Ieper (Ypres) towards Antwerpen-Centraal |

== See also ==
- List of railway stations in Belgium
- Rail transport in Belgium
