= Kortrijk railway station =

Railway station in West Flanders, Belgium

Kortrijk
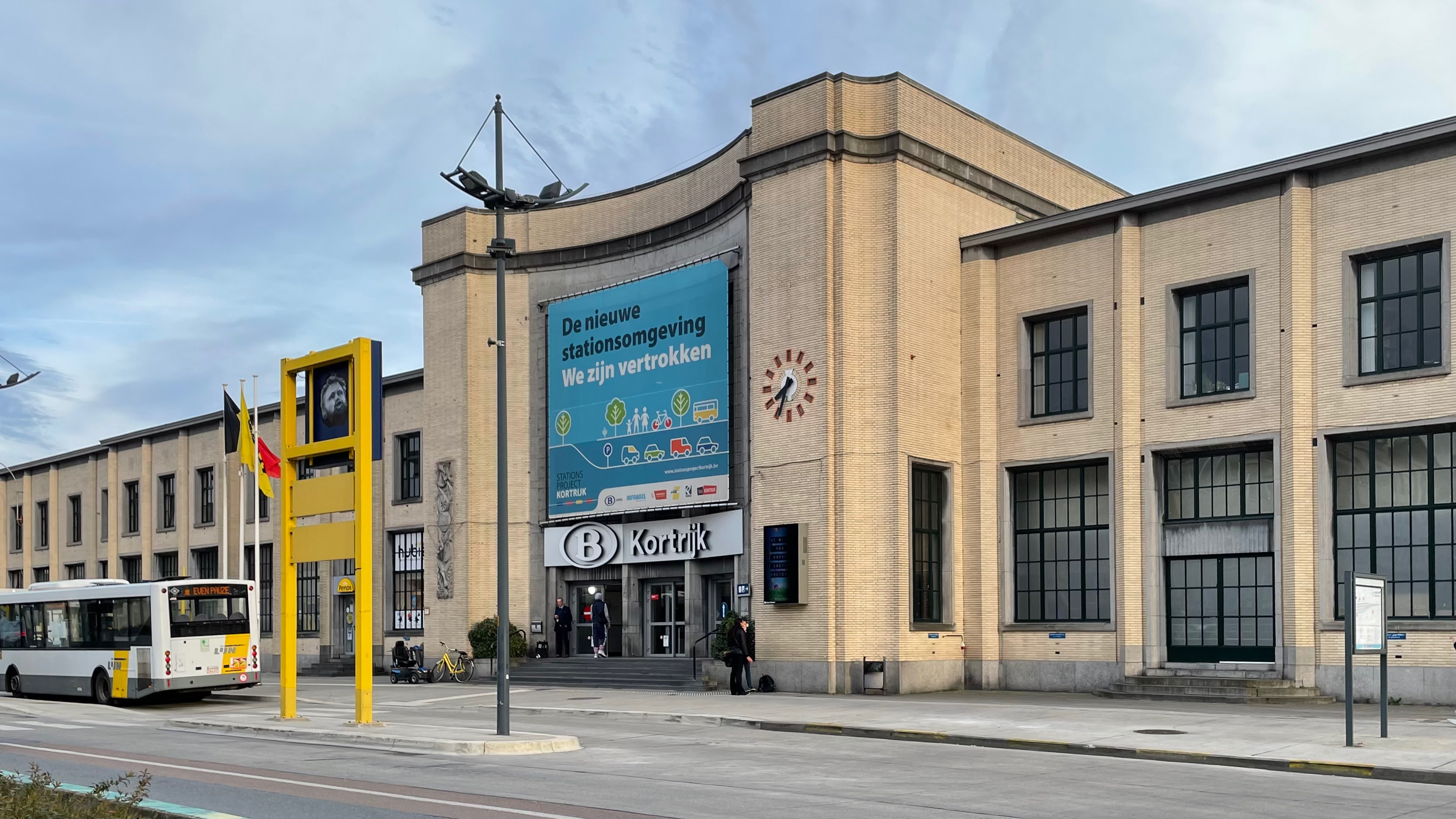
- Kortrijk railway station

General information
- Location: Stationsplein, 8500 Kortrijk; Belgium
- Coordinates: 50°49′27″N 3°15′50″E
- System: Railway Station
- Owner: NMBS/SNCB
- Operator: NMBS/SNCB
- Platforms: 8

Other information
- Station code: KORT

History
- Opened: 22 September 1839; 186 years ago
Location
- Location within Belgium Location within Europe

Kortrijk railway station (Dutch: Station Kortrijk; French: Gare de Courtrai) is the main railway station in Kortrijk, West Flanders, Belgium. The station was first inaugurated on 22 September 1839. With around 10,000 passengers per day, Kortrijk is the fifteenth-busiest railway station in Belgium, and the second in West Flanders. It is operated by the National Railway Company of Belgium (NMBS/SNCB).

The following railway lines converge in this station: line 66 (Bruges–Kortrijk) and line 75 (Ghent–Mouscron). Railway lines 69 (Kortrijk–Ieper–Poperinge) and 89 (Denderleeuw–Kortrijk) begin just outside the station. Several national Intercity-trains, Interregio-trains and local trains also stop there, as do international trains like the Intercity-train to Lille-Flandres station in Lille, France.

== History ==
The first railway line, connecting Kortrijk to Ghent, was inaugurated on 22 September 1838 by King Leopold I and Queen Louise-Marie. The first railway station on this site was inaugurated in 1839.

The building itself was enlarged several times. The second building opened in 1857 and was enlarged in 1876. This monumental building originally included a glass and iron construction covering the platforms and rails. This construction and the original building were severely damaged during World War II.

After the war, a brand new station was inaugurated on 7 July 1956. The structure covering the platforms and rails was demolished and replaced by awnings covering the platforms.

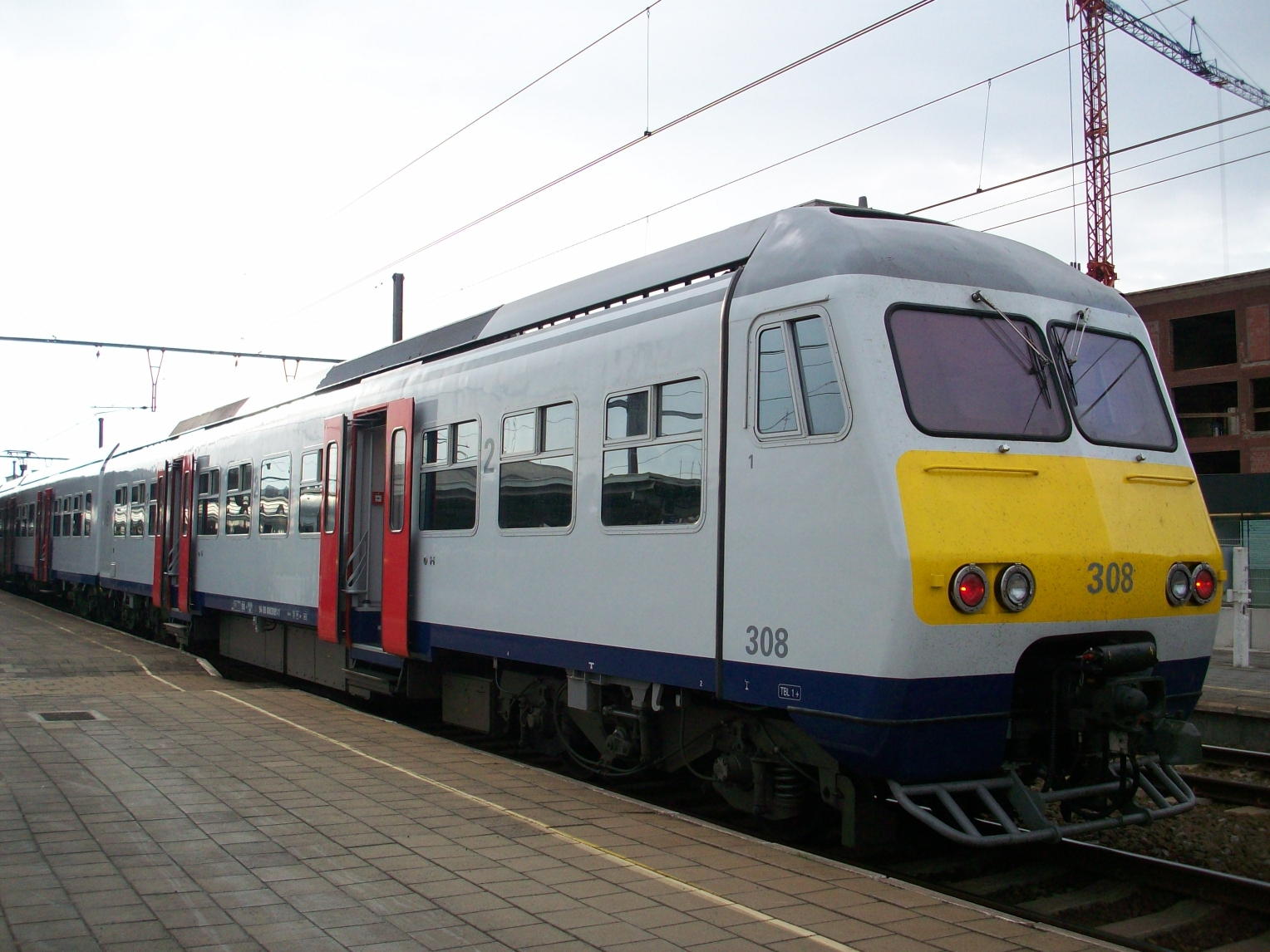
NMBS/SNCB rolling stock in Kortrijk station

== Train services ==
The station is served by the following services:

- Intercity services (IC-04) Lille/Poperinge - Kortrijk - Ghent - Sint-Niklaas - Antwerp
- Intercity services (IC-12) Kortrijk - Ghent - Brussels - Leuven - Liege - Welkenraedt (weekdays)
- Intercity services (IC-12) Kortrijk - Ghent (weekends)
- Intercity services (IC-23) Ostend - Bruges - Kortrijk - Zottegem - Brussels - Brussels Airport
- Intercity services (IC-26) Kortrijk - Tournai - Halle - Brussels - Dendermonde - Lokeren - Sint Niklaas (weekdays)
- Intercity services (IC-32) Bruges - Roeselare - Kortrijk
- Local services (L-05) Kortrijk - Oudenaarde - Ghent - Eeklo (weekdays)

| Preceding station | NMBS/SNCB | Following station |
|---|---|---|
| Mouscron towards Lille-Flandres | IC 04 | Waregem towards Antwerpen-Centraal |
| Bissegem towards Poperinge | IC 04 | Waregem towards Antwerpen-Centraal |
| Terminus | IC 12 weekdays, except holidays | Harelbeke towards Welkenraedt |
| Terminus | IC 12 weekends | Harelbeke towards Gent-Sint-Pieters |
| Ingelmunster towards Oostende | IC 23 | Oudenaarde towards Brussels National Airport |
| Terminus | IC 26 weekdays | Mouscron towards Sint-Niklaas |
| Ingelmunster towards Brugge | IC 32 | Terminus |
| Terminus | L 05 weekdays | Vichte towards Eeklo |

== Railway stations in Kortrijk ==
Other railway stations in Kortrijk are:

- Kortrijk-Vorming railway station (previously called Congostatie)
- Bissegem railway station

Former railway stations in Kortrijk are:

- Aalbeke railway station
- Heule railway station
- Heule-Leiaarde railway station
- Kortrijk-Weide railway station
- Kortrijk-West railway station
- Marke railway station
- Sint-Katerine railway station

== See also ==
- List of railway stations in Belgium
- Rail transport in Belgium
