= List of railway stations in Brussels =

This is a list of railway stations in the Brussels-Capital Region of Belgium. The municipality of each station is also listed. There are 35 stations in the Brussels-Capital Region, 8 of which bear the name Brussels. All stations listed are correct to February 2021.

Because the Brussels-Capital Region is officially bilingual, the stations and municipalities with a Dutch name and a French name will be written: French name/Dutch name.

== Stations ==
Station	Municipality
Anderlecht	Anderlecht
Arcades/Arcaden	Watermael-Boitsfort/Watermaal-Bosvoorde
Boondael/Boondaal	Ixelles/Elsene
Bordet	Evere
Boitsfort/Bosvoorde	Watermael-Boitsfort/Watermaal-Bosvoorde
Bruxelles-Central/Brussel-Centraal	Ville de Bruxelles/Stad Brussel
Bruxelles-Congrès/Brussel-Congres	Ville de Bruxelles/Stad Brussel
Bruxelles-Chapelle/Brussel-Kapellekerk	Ville de Bruxelles/Stad Brussel
Bruxelles-Luxembourg/Brussel-Luxemburg	Ixelles/Elsene
Bruxelles-Nord/Brussel-Noord	Schaerbeek/Schaarbeek
Bruxelles-Schuman/Brussel-Schuman	Ville de Bruxelles/Stad Brussel
Bruxelles-Ouest/Brussel-West	Molenbeel-Saint-Jean/Sint-Jans-Molenbeek
Brusselles-Midi/Brussel-Zuid	Saint-Gilles/Sint-Gillis
Bockstael	Ville de Bruxelles/Stad Brussel
Delta	Auderghem/Oudergem
Vivier-d'Oie/Diesdelle	Uccle/Ukkel
Etterbeek	Ixelles/Elsene
Evere	Evere
Haren	Ville de Bruxelles/Stad Brussel
Haren-Sud/Haren-Zuid	Ville de Bruxelles/Stad Brussel
Jette	Jette
Meiser	Schaerbeek/Schaarbeek
Merode	Etterbeek
Moensberg	Uccle/Ukkel
Germoir/Mouterij	Ixelles/Elsene
Schaerbeek/Schaarbeek	Ville de Bruxelles/Stad Brussel
Simonis	Koekelberg
Berchem-Sainte-Agathe/Sint-Agatha-Berchem	Berchem-Sainte-Agathe/Sint-Agatha-Berchem
Saint-Job/Sint-Job	Uccle/Ukkel
Tour et Taxis/Thurn en Taxis	Ville de Bruxelles/Stad Brussel
Uccle Calevoet/Ukkel-Kalevoet	Uccle/Ukkel
Uccle-Stalle/Ukkel-Stalle	Uccle/Ukkel
Forest-Est/Vorst-Oost	Forest/Vorst
Forest-Midi/Vorst-Zuid	Forest/Vorst
Watermael/Watermaal	Watermael-Boitsfort/Watermaal-Bosvoorde

== Municipal statistics ==
Number of stations per municipality
Municipality	Number of stations
Anderlecht	1
Ixelles/Elsene	4
Etterbeek	1
Evere	2
Ganshoren	0
Jette	1
Koekelberg	1
Auderghem/Oudergem	1
Schaerbeek/Schaarbeek	2
Berchem-Sainte-Agathe/Sint-Agatha-Berchem	1
Saint-Gilles/Sint-Gillis	1
Molenbeek-Saint-Jean/Sint-Jans-Molenbeek	1
Saint-Josse-ten-Noode/Sint-Joost-ten-Node	0
Woluwe-Saint-Lambert/Sint-Lambrechts-Woluwe	0
Woluwe-Saint-Pierre/Sint-Pieters-Woluwe	0
Ville de Bruxelles/Stad Brussel	9
Uccle/Ukkel	5
Forest/Vorst	2
Watermael-Boitsfort/Watermaal-Bosvoorde	3
