= Brussels S Train =

Commuter rail network in Brussels, Belgium

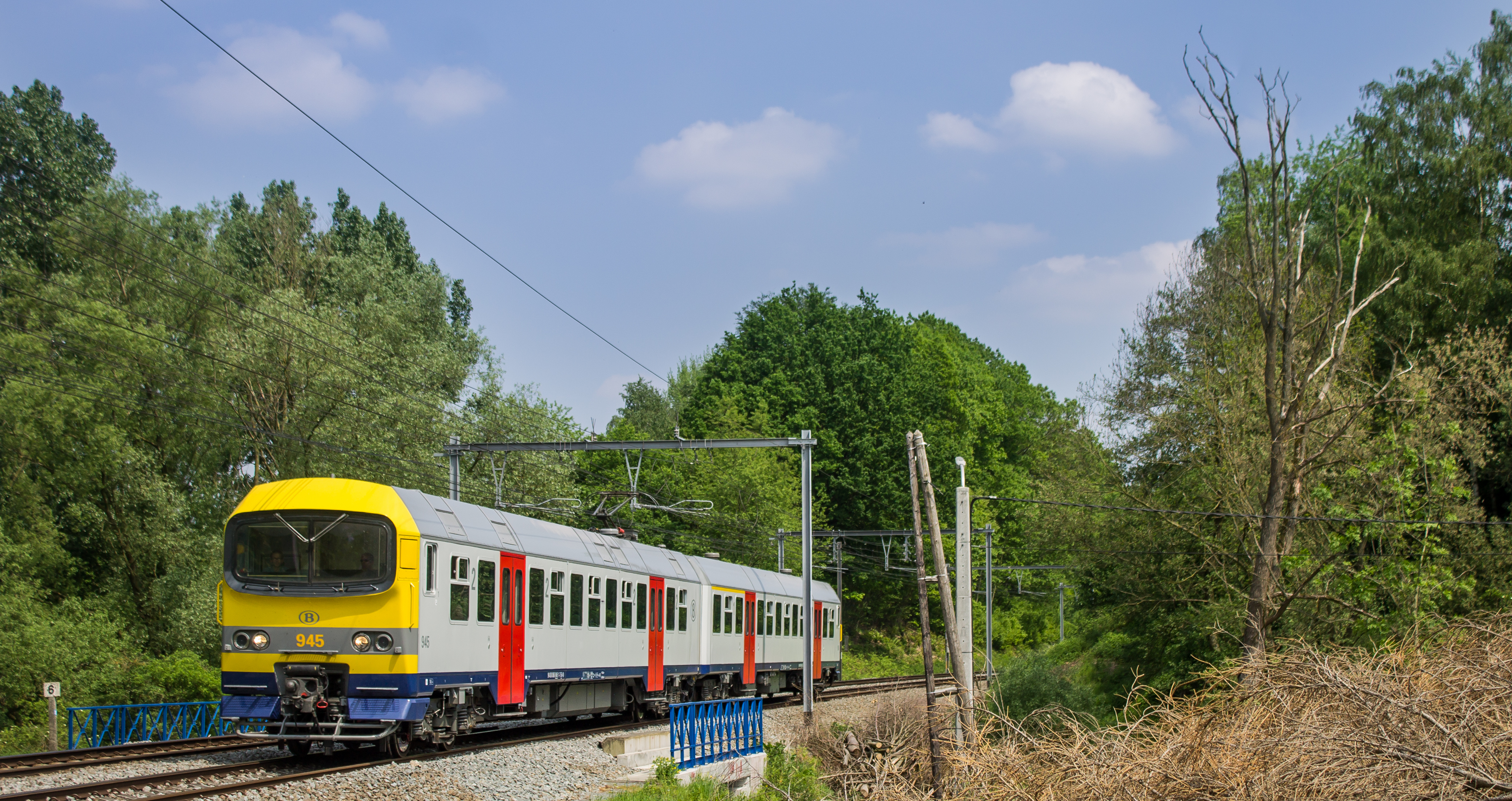
- Brussels S Train near Beersel in May 2016

Overview
- Owner: Infrabel
- Locale: Brussels, Belgium
- Transit type: S-Bahn
- Number of lines: 12
- Number of stations: 144
- Website: S Train (in English)

Operation
- Began operation: 13 December 2015; 10 years ago
- Operator: National Railway Company of Belgium
- Headway: 15 minutes (projected)

Technical
- System length: 350 km (217 mi)
- Track gauge: 1,435 mm (4 ft 8 1/2 in) standard gauge
- Electrification: Overhead line, 3,000 V DC
- Top speed: 160 km/h (99 mph)
Network map
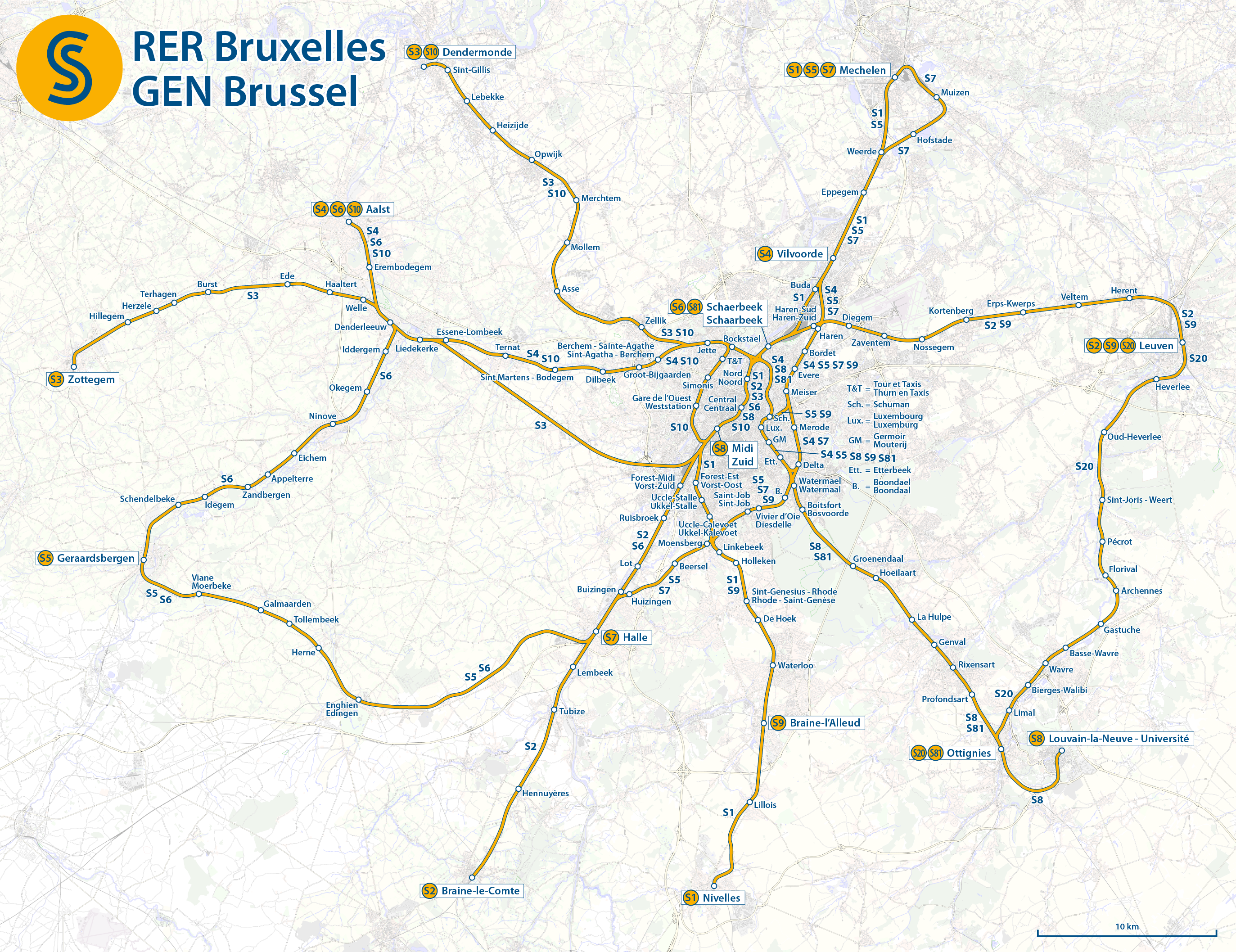

The Brussels S Train, also known as the Brussels Regional Express Network (French: Réseau Express Régional Bruxellois or RER; Dutch: Gewestelijk ExpresNet or GEN) is a suburban rail system in and around the Brussels-Capital Region of Belgium. It will offer fast connections and increased frequency within a 30 km (19 mi) radius of the region, covering a territory inhabited by 2.5 million people.

Most jobs in the Brussels-Capital Region are filled by workers from other regions. Private vehicles clog the city daily, hampering mobility and creating pollution. The RER/GEN is a response to these growing problems. Only 20% of commuters use public transport daily; the goal is to double this figure by facilitating movement into and within the region.

Total costs for the GEN/RER project will be at least €2.173bn. The initially planned nine lines have since increased to 12; but the projected frequency of "a departure at least every 15 minutes" has not been implemented as of early 2018: most services run once per hour, a few twice per hour.

The scope includes widening existing railway lines from double to quadruple; a few additions like the Schuman-Josaphat tunnel; the creation or re-activation of stations just outside Brussels' city centre (Germoir/Mouterij and Arcades/Arcaden on the south-east, Brussels-West and Tour et Taxis/Thurn en Taxis on the west); and the acquisition of new rolling stock.

== History ==
A first draft of the RER/GEN network was published in 1995. The commissioning of the first lines was then planned for 2002.

Construction required approval and funding from the Federal Government and the three regions, as well as the collaboration of four public transit companies (NMBS/SNCB, MIVB/STIB, De Lijn and TEC). The initial work started in 2005, and service was supposed to start in 2012. However, Belgium's administrative complexity caused numerous delays and postponements; the network will now be put into service between 2015 and 2025.

== Infrastructure ==
Railway lines within a 30 km (19 mi) radius of Brussels are included in the project. Parts of the project are already in place. The most substantial works relate to the quad-tracking of several lines: two tracks for GEN/RER trains, and two tracks for intercity and high-speed trains.

The RER/GEN project includes a 1.25 km (0.78 mi) double-tracked Schuman-Josaphat tunnel in the north-east of the region. This links the European Quarter to Brussels Airport, cutting to 13 minutes journey times between the two.

Most of the network uses existing rail lines. Increased frequencies and passengers, however, requires other significant infrastructure projects, in addition to the Schuman-Josaphat tunnel:

- Quad-tracking of sections in order to segregate local and regional traffic from faster inter-city trains
- Demolition and reconstruction of several bridges that cross the wider track
- Construction of additional breakpoints
- Installation of noise barriers
- Redevelopment of 28 existing stations in Brussels
- Creation of transfer points
- Construction of park-and-ride lots

== Rolling stock ==
As of 2020, most services are operated by either new Siemens Desiro or refurbished MS86 "Sprinter", both electric multiple units.

NMBS/SNCB had ordered 305 Siemens Desiro ML single-deck electric multiple units, a €1.425bn contract. These will have a 2MW power rating and a capacity of 280, with construction announced as being at Siemens' plant in Krefeld-Uerdingen, Germany.

== Network ==
Line	Route	Stops	Frequency
S1	Antwerp–Mechelen–Brussels NSC–Nivelles	31	2x/h
S2	Braine-le-Comte–Brussels NSC–Leuven	22	2x/h
S3	Zottegem–Brussels NSC–Dendermonde	25	1x/h (weekdays only, replaced by through running S8 on weekends)
S4	Aalst-Etterbeek-Merode-Vilvoorde	26	1x/h (weekdays only)
S5	Geraardsbergen-Schuman-Josaphat tunnel-Mechelen	25	2x/h (Halle-Mechelen); 1/h (Geraardsbergen-Halle)
S6	Schaarbeek-NSC-Geraardsbergen-Denderleeuw	21	1x/h
S7	Halle-Merode-Mechelen via Hofstade	18	1x/h
S8	Louvain-la-Neuve-NSC-Brussels-South-(Zottegem)	16	2x/h (1/2 train continues to Zottegem). (1x/h on weekends)
S81	Ottignies-Schaarbeek	10	Peak (weekdays only)
S9	Braine-l'Alleud-Schuman-Josaphat tunnel-Leuven	19	1xh (continues to Landen on weekdays)
S10	Aalst-NSC-Brussels West-Dendermonde	28	1x/h
S19	Charleroi-Schuman-Josaphat tunnel-Brussels Airport	20	1x/h (weekdays)
S19	Nivelles-Schuman-Josaphat tunnel-Brussels Airport-Leuven	15	1x/h (weekends)
S20	Ottignies-Leuven	13	2x/h

S20 connects Leuven (S2/S9) and Ottignies (S8/S81) without passing through Brussels Capital Region.

== See also ==
- Trams in Brussels
- Brussels Metro
- Transport in Brussels
- List of commuter rail systems
