= Arcades railway station =

Railway station in Brussels, Belgium

Coordinates: 50°48′34″N 4°23′54″E

Arcades Arcaden
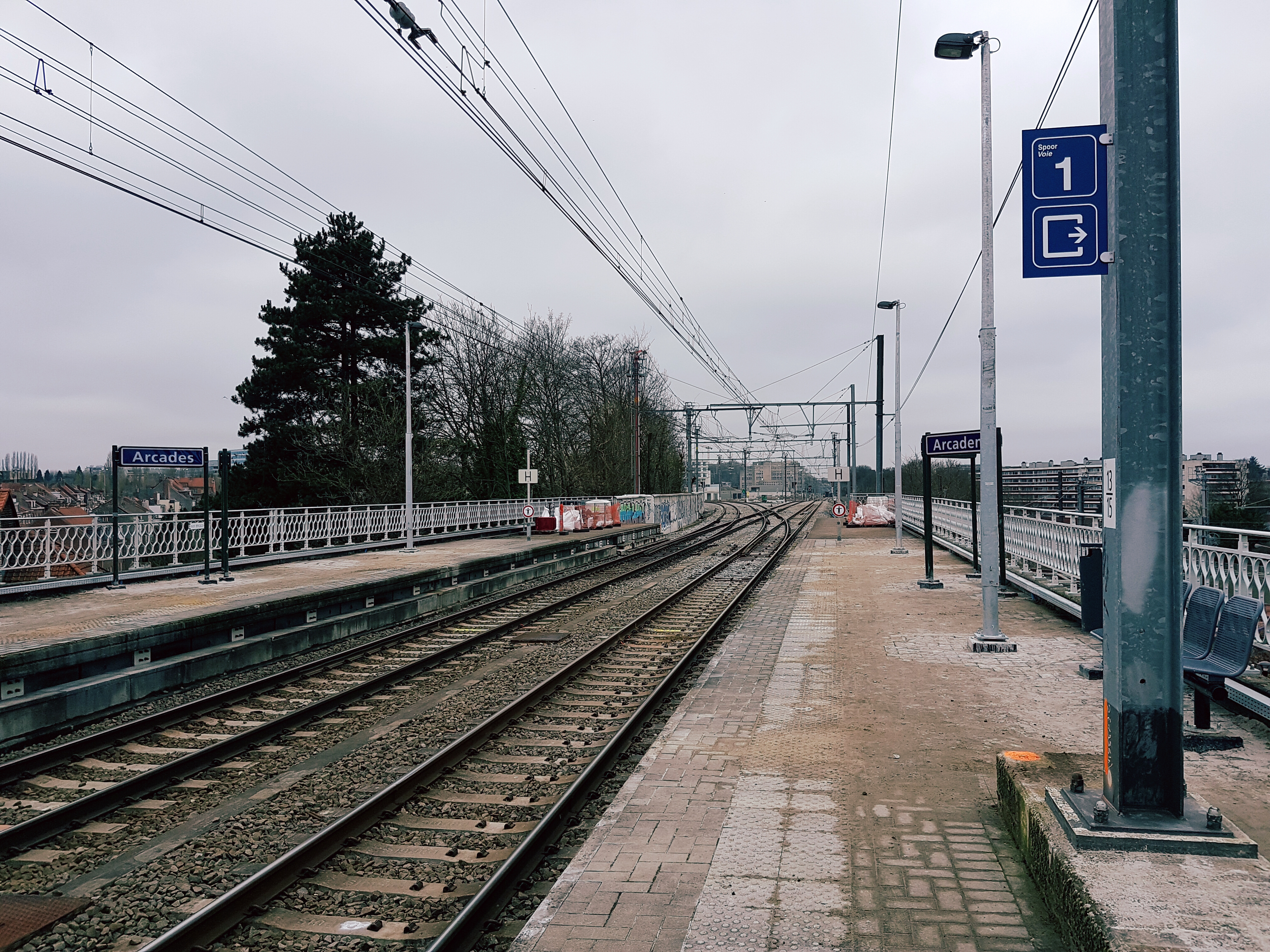
- Arcades/Arcaden railway station

General information
- Location: Watermael-Boitsfort, Brussels-Capital Region; Belgium
- System: Railway Station
- Owner: SNCB/NMBS
- Operator: SNCB/NMBS

History
- Opened: 2016; 10 years ago
Location
- Location within Belgium Location within Europe

Arcades railway station (French: Gare des Arcades) or Arcaden railway station (Dutch: Station Arcaden) (Note: Officially Arcades/Arcaden (French: Arcades; Dutch: Arcaden)) is a railway station located in the municipality of Watermael-Boitsfort in Brussels, Belgium. It is served by the Brussels Regional Express Network (RER/GEN) operated by the National Railway Company of Belgium (NMBS/SNCB). The station has two platforms and is wheelchair accessible.

== History ==
Originally built between 2005 and 2009 at a cost of about €1 million, the station stood unused for years due to lack of accessibility and delays in developing the network it was intended to serve. In 2011, its opening was pushed back to 2019, making it a controversial example of wastefulness in infrastructure spending. The station finally opened in 2016.

== Train services ==
The station is served by the following service:

- Brussels RER services (S7) Mechelen - Merode - Halle (weekdays only)

Preceding station	NMBS/SNCB	Following station
Delta toward Mechelen	S 7 weekdays	Boondael toward Halle

== See also ==
- List of railway stations in Belgium
- Rail transport in Belgium
- Transport in Brussels
- History of Brussels
