= Schuman metro station =

Metro station in Brussels, Belgium

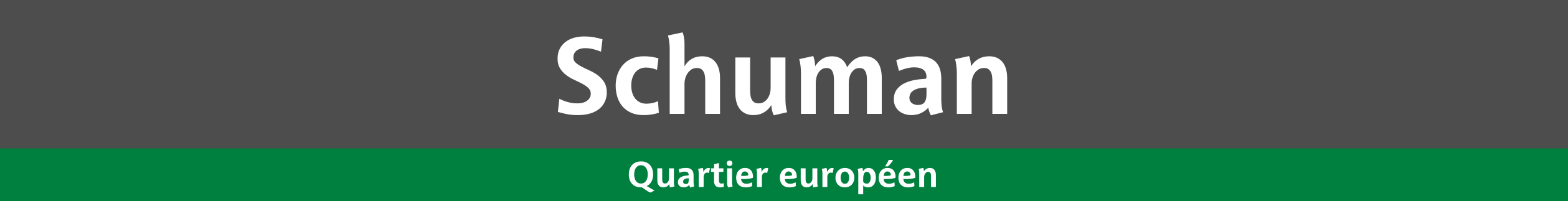

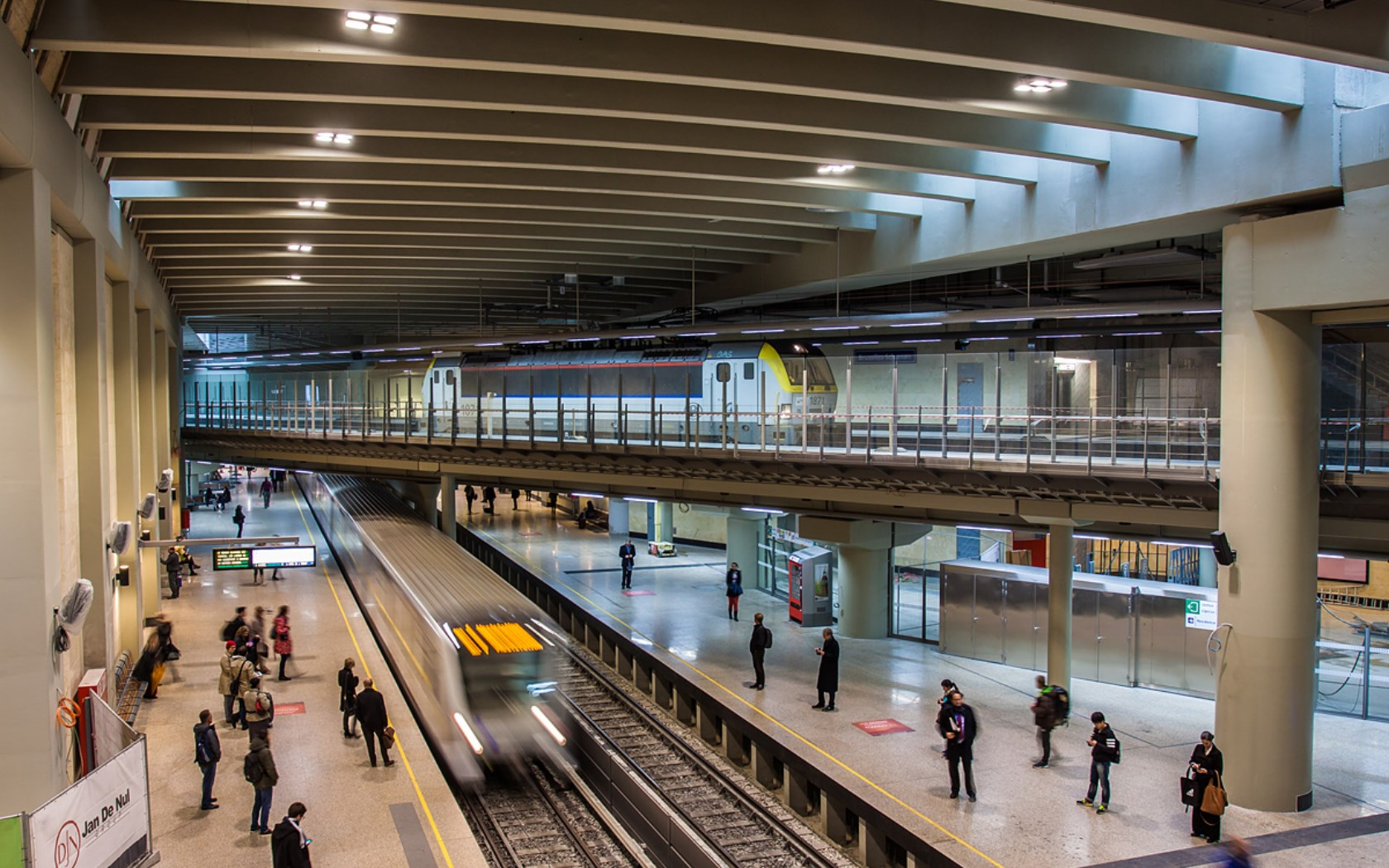
- Schuman metro station

General information
- Location: Rue de la Loi / Wetstraat; 1000 City of Brussels, Brussels-Capital Region, Belgium
- Coordinates: 50°50′34″N 4°22′54″E
- Owner: STIB/MIVB
- Platforms: 2
- Tracks: 2

Construction
- Structure type: Below grade

History
- Opened: 17 December 1969; 56 years ago (premetro); 20 September 1976; 50 years ago (metro)

Services
Preceding station	Brussels Metro	Following station
Maelbeek/Maalbeek towards Gare de l'Ouest/Weststation	Line 1	Merode towards Stockel/Stokkel
Maelbeek/Maalbeek towards Erasme/Erasmus	Line 5	Merode towards Herrmann-Debroux
Location

Schuman (French pronunciation: [ʃuman]) is a Brussels Metro station on lines 1 and 5. It is located under the Rue de la Loi/Wetstraat in the City of Brussels, Belgium. The station received its name from the aboveground Robert Schuman Roundabout, itself named after Robert Schuman, one of the founding fathers of the European Union, the Council of Europe and NATO.

The station opened on 17 December 1969 as a premetro (underground tram) station on the tram line between De Brouckère and Schuman. This station was upgraded to full metro status on 20 September 1976, serving former east–west line 1 (further split in 1982 into former lines 1A and 1B). Then, following the reorganisation of the Brussels Metro on 4 April 2009, it now lies on the joint section of east–west lines 1 and 5.

The metro station is located under Schuman railway station, serving Brussels' European Quarter.

== History ==
Schuman station was inaugurated on 17 December 1969 as a premetro station (i.e. a station served by underground tramways), as part of the first underground public transport route in Belgium, which initially stretched from De Brouckère to Schuman. On 20 September 1976, this premetro line was converted into a heavy metro line, which was later split into two distinct lines on 6 October 1982: former lines 1A and 1B, both serving Schuman. On 4 April 2009, metro operation was restructured and the station is now served by metro lines 1 and 5.

From 2008 to 2016, the metro and railway stations underwent major renovation works, transforming Schuman into a multimodal transport hub. A new railway bridge was constructed over the metro hall, which also received a new glass roof, allowing more daylight into the station.

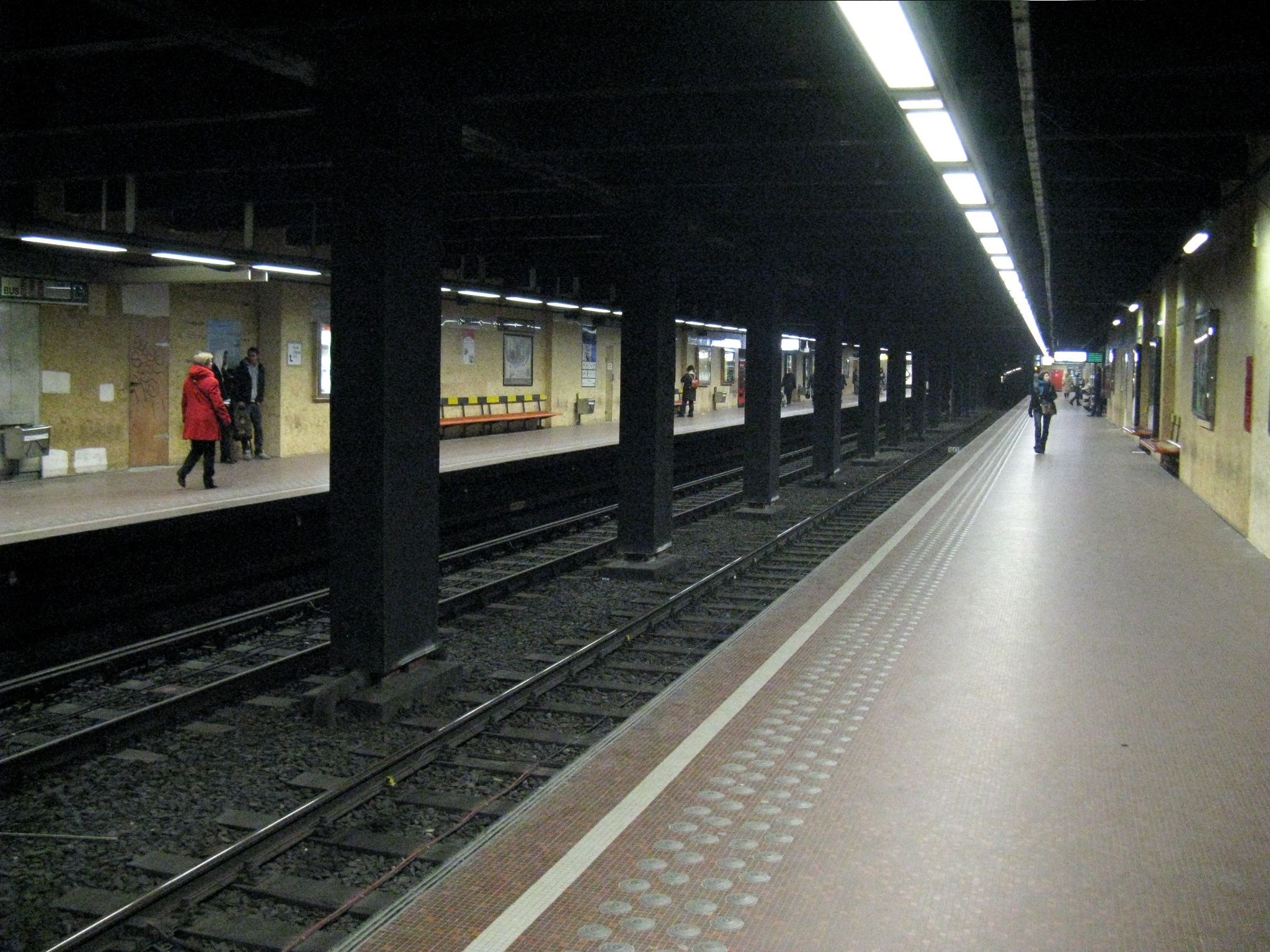
Schuman metro station under renovations in 2011

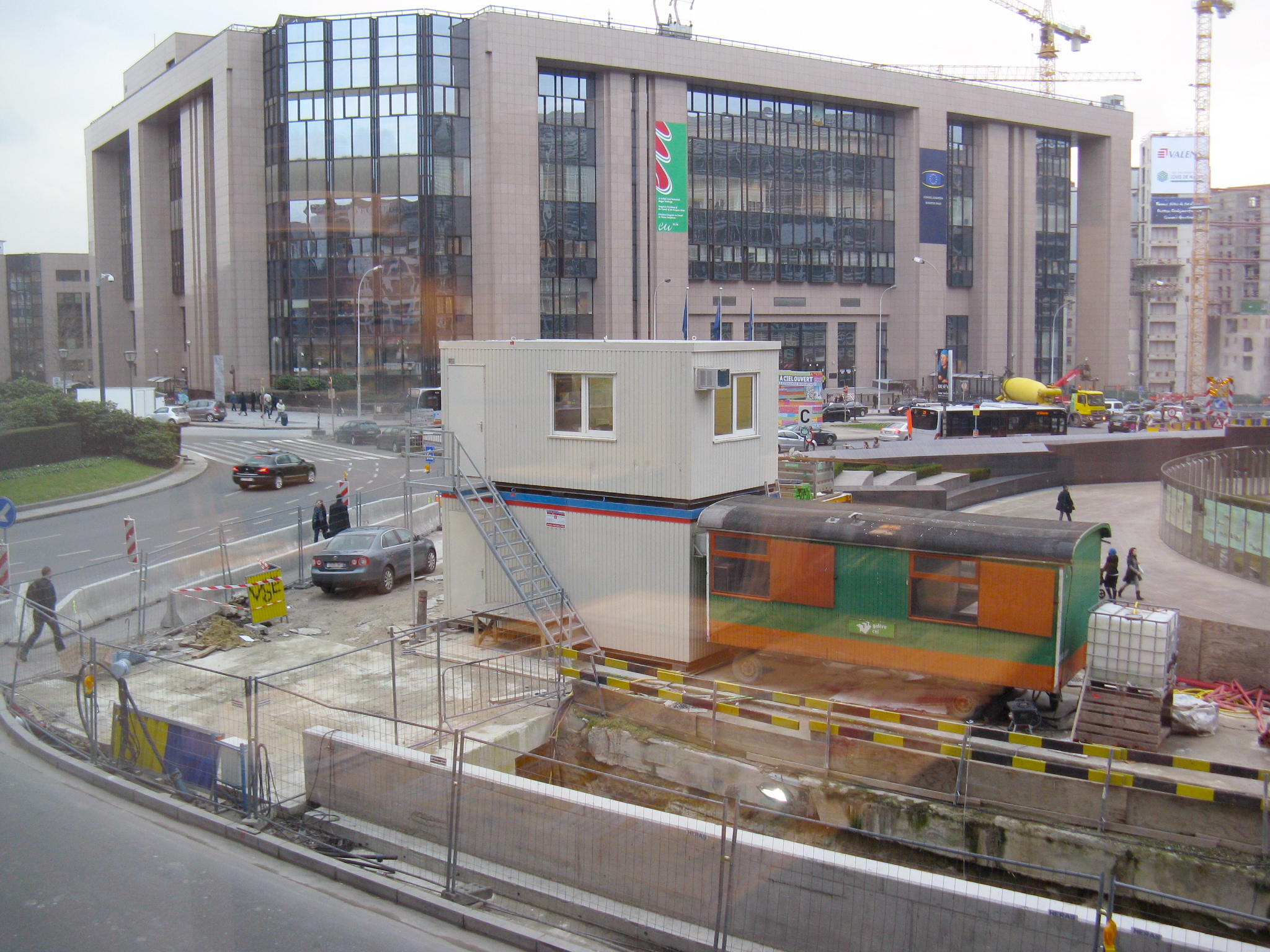
Above ground works, during winter 2011. The Europa building is under construction in the background.

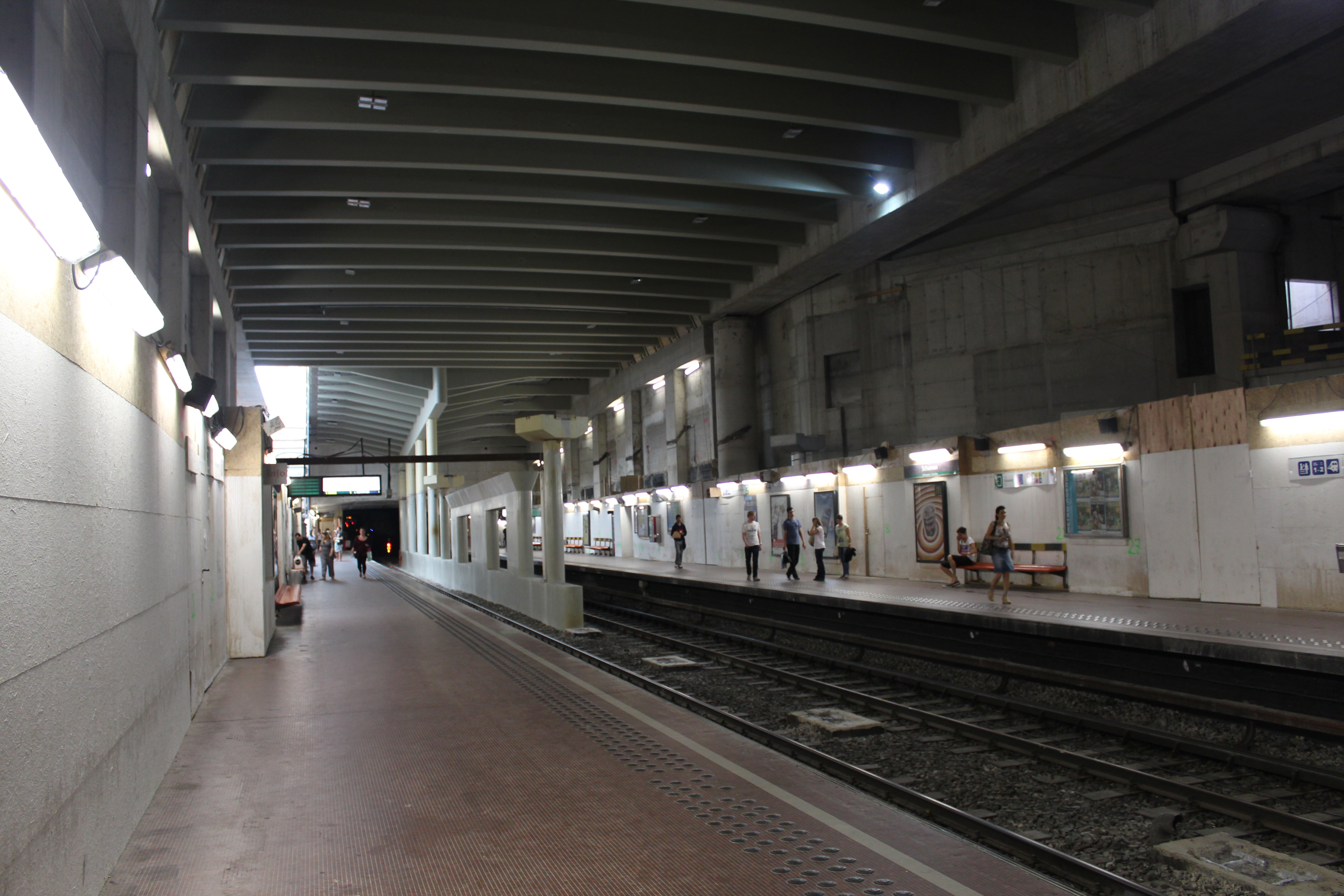
Metro platform in summer 2013, revealing the shape of the new station

== Area ==
The station is in the centre of Brussels' European Quarter, being adjacent to the Berlaymont building (headquarters of the European Commission), the Justus Lipsius building (used to hold low-level meetings of the Council of the European Union and provide office space to the Council's Secretariat) and numerous other EU offices. It lies under the Rue de la Loi/Wetstraat, a major city thoroughfare, and is close to the Parc du Cinquantenaire/Jubelpark.

== See also ==
- Transport in Brussels
- History of Brussels
