= Brussels-Luxembourg railway station =

Railway station in Brussels, Belgium

Brussels-Luxembourg
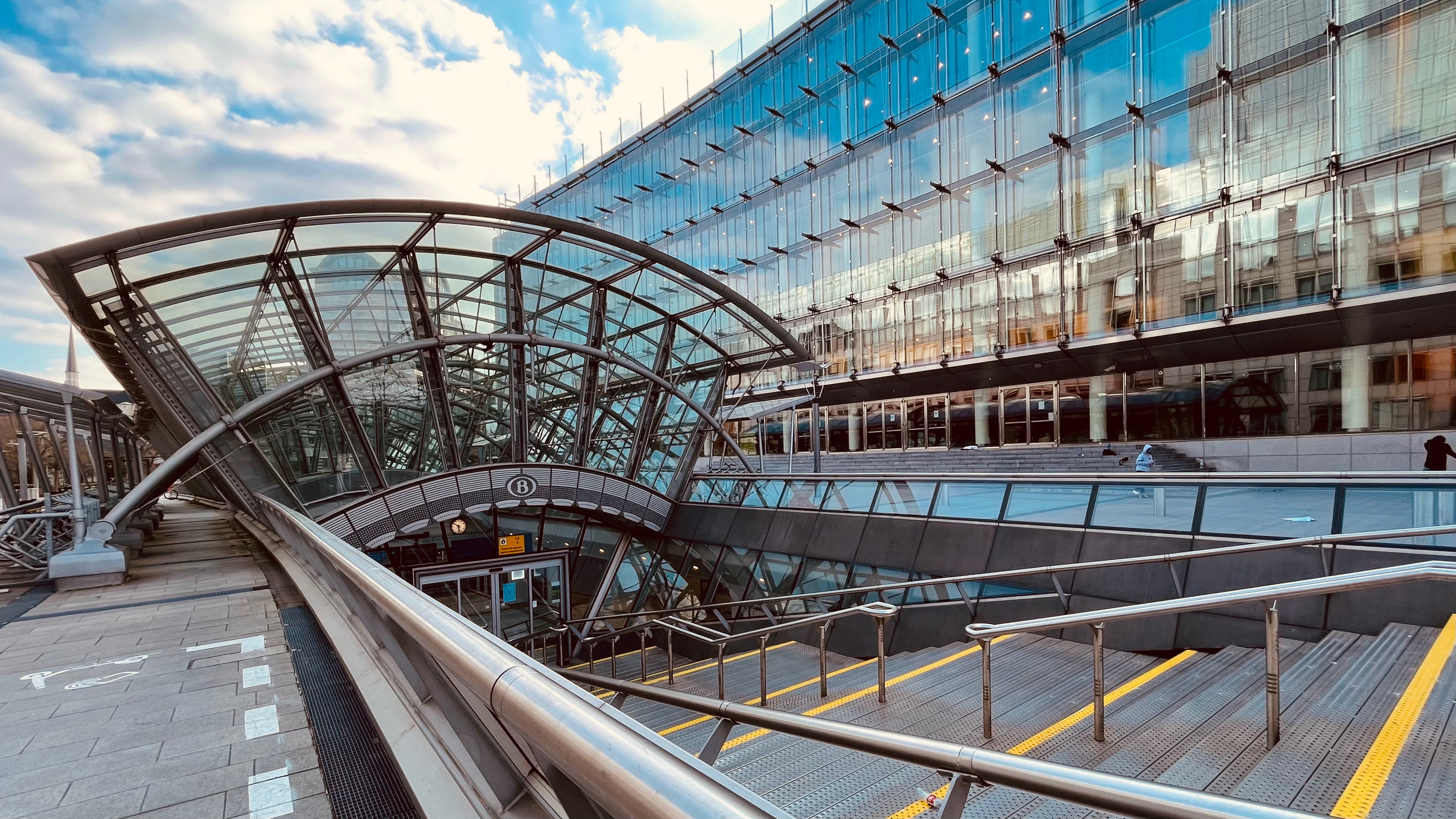
- Brussels-Luxembourg railway station

General information
- Location: Rue de Trèves / Trierstraat; 1050 Ixelles, Brussels-Capital Region; Belgium
- Coordinates: 50°50′20″N 4°22′26″E
- System: Railway station
- Owner: SNCB/NMBS
- Operator: SNCB/NMBS
- Platforms: 6

Construction
- Architect: Gustave Saintenoy

Other information
- Station code: LX

History
- Opened: 1854; 172 years ago
Location
- Location within Belgium Location within Europe

Brussels-Luxembourg railway station (French: Gare de Bruxelles-Luxembourg; Dutch: Station Brussel-Luxemburg) (Note: Officially Brussels-Luxembourg (French: Bruxelles-Luxembourg; Dutch: Brussel-Luxemburg)) is a railway station in the European Quarter of Brussels, Belgium, located under the Esplanade of the European Parliament (part of the European Parliament complex). The train services are operated by the National Railway Company of Belgium (SNCB/NMBS).

== History ==
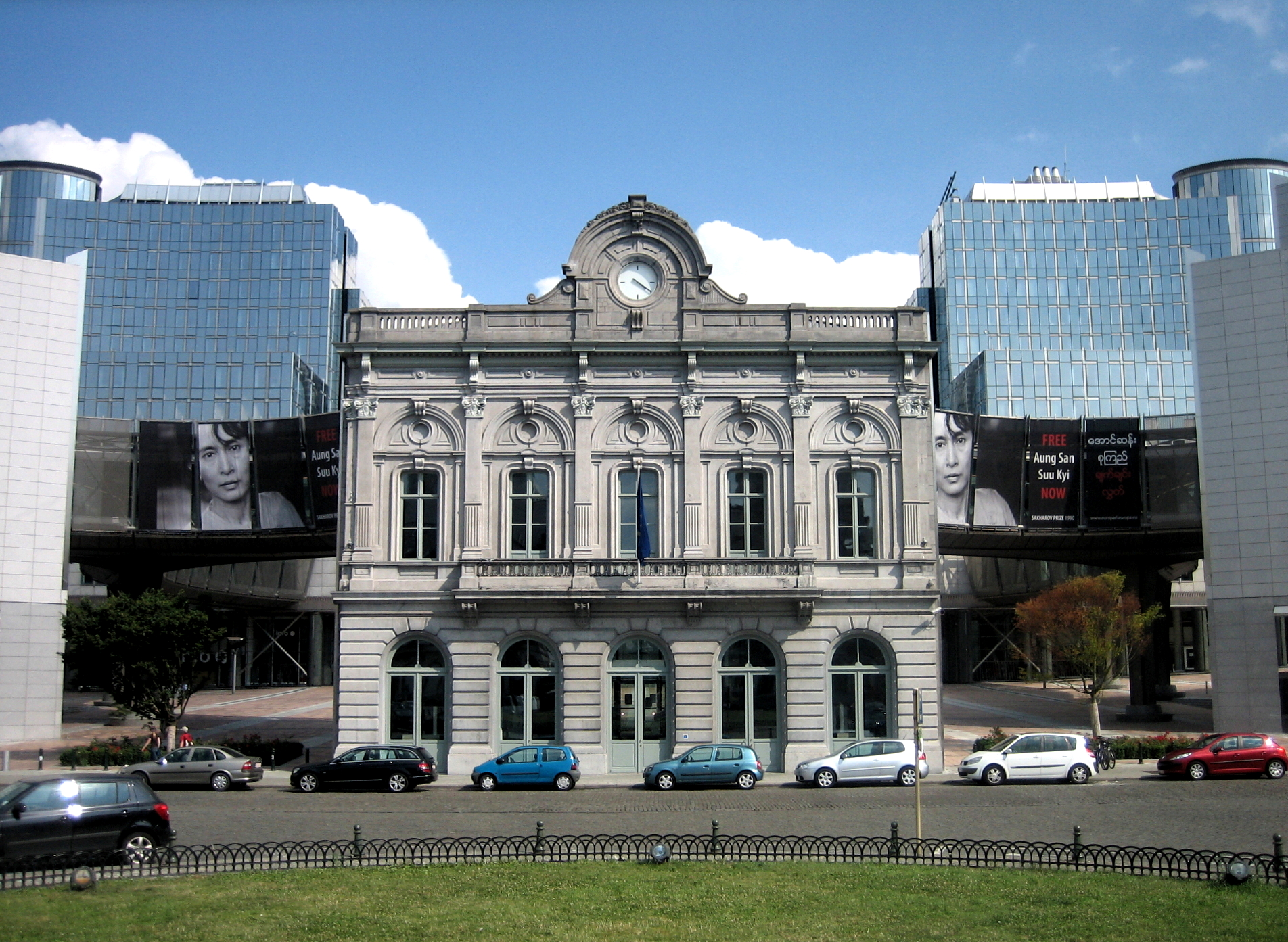
The former Brussels-Luxembourg station's entrance by Gustave Saintenoy (1854–55)

The station was built between 1854 and 1855 by the Grande Compagnie de Luxembourg, as part of the Brussels-Luxembourg railway line it was constructing. It was to service the new Leopold Quarter, hence its original name of Leopold Quarter railway station (French: Gare du Quartier Léopold, Dutch: Station Leopoldswijk). The lead architect was Gustave Saintenoy, who designed it in a neoclassical style, in keeping with the other buildings around the Place du Luxembourg/Luxemburgplein, which were built around the same time.

The station was Brussels' third, after Allée Verte/Groendreef railway station near the site of today's Yser/IJzer metro station, north of the City of Brussels, and the Bogards' railway station near the Place Rouppe/Rouppeplein in the southern part of the city (which would eventually become Brussels-North railway station and Brussels-South railway station, respectively). Unlike those two, however, Leopold Quarter railway station was designed as a transit station rather than a terminal one. It was painted by the French artist Henri Ottmann in The Luxembourg Station in Brussels (1903).

During the 19th century, the station was divided into sections to differentiate the three different classes of travel. The station was extended in 1899 and 1921 with single storey pavilions, which were then amalgamated in 1934, when the façade was standardised.

== Reconstruction ==
Prior to its reconstruction in the 1990s and 2000s, the station was ground level with its front building facing the Place du Luxembourg. It was redesigned as a subsurface-track station to make way for the European Parliament and a pedestrian link between the Place du Luxembourg and Leopold Park. The tracks were covered over and moved underground during the 1990s. The station's old building was partly demolished in 2004, with the central entrance building being incorporated into the European Parliament complex as an information office until 2016.

Today, the central entrance has been repurposed as "Station Europe", a welcome point of the European Parliament. There, visitors can find many gadgets, such as an augmented reality model of the complex, offering information on the European Parliament, its buildings, its history and the personalities who came to visit. The entrance to the station is now a few metres to the south, via stairs descending from the esplanade or via a ground floor entrance through the European Parliament's József Antall building on the Rue de Trèves/Trierstraat.

The station, completed in 2009, is now entirely underground, although it has been designed to allow a maximum of natural light in. Stained glass windows from the original structure were incorporated into the new building. It now covers 16,000 m^{2} (170,000 sq ft) and is owned and operated by the National Railway Company of Belgium (NMBS/SNCB). The same architects consortium responsible for the European Parliament, Atelier Espace Léopold, were also in charge of the station's redesign.

== Future ==
According to its 2004 planning document, the Brussels Intercommunal Transport Company (STIB/MIVB) has long term plans to open a metro stop at the station. There is congestion along the main metro route running through the European Quarter, and there are too many transfers being made at Arts-Loi/Kunst-Wet. To relieve this, a branch would be directed from Merode to Trône/Troon, via Brussels-Luxembourg. There may be a further metro line running south-west from the station to serve Ixelles, the Chaussée de Waterloo/Waterloosesteenweg, and Vanderkindere. This would make the station one of the major transfer points of the Brussels Metro system. The plan also hopes to make the city's railway stations more inter-connected, allowing for easier transfers between Brussels-South, Brussels-Schuman, and Brussels-Luxembourg.

== Train services ==
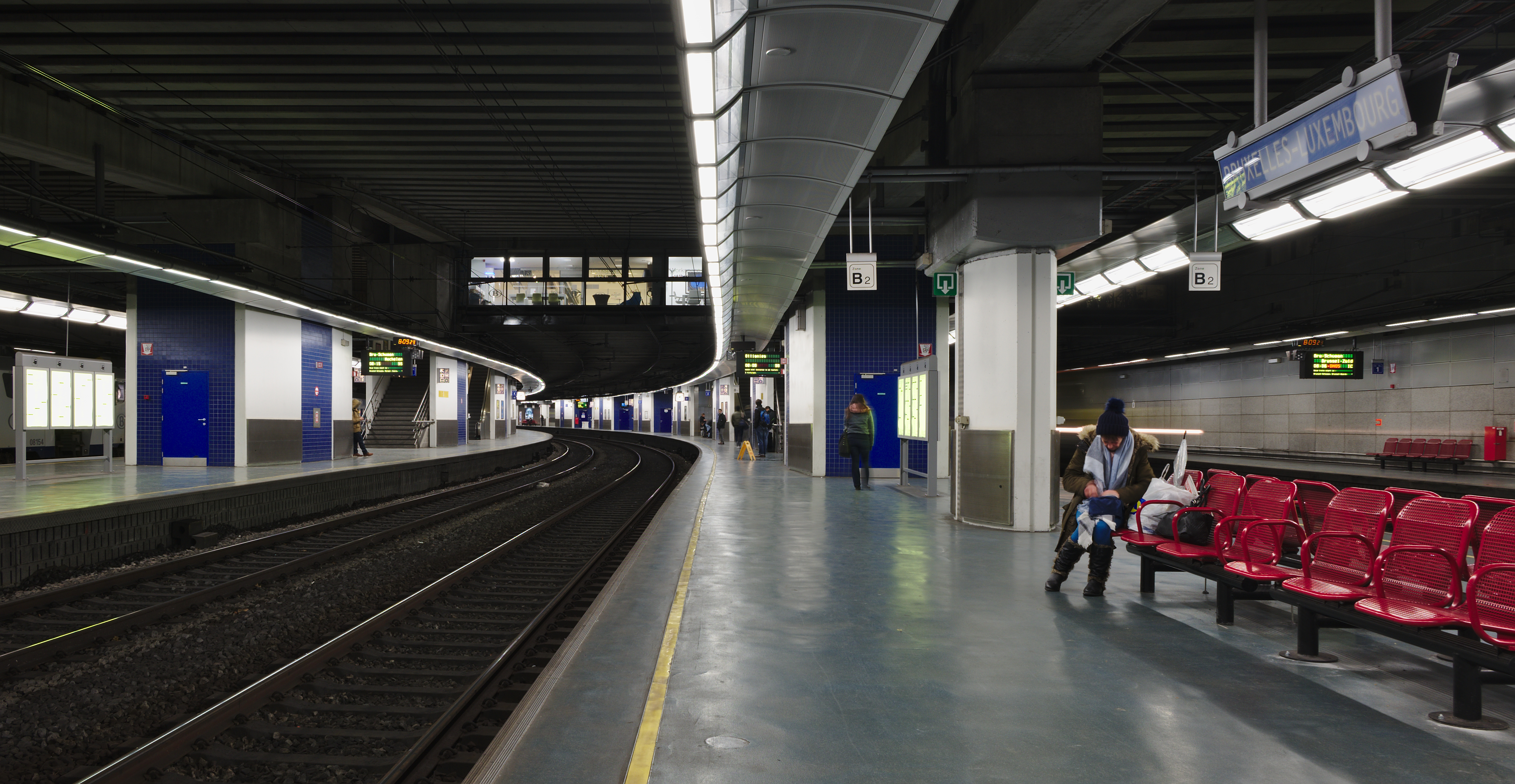
Underground platforms

The station is served by the following service(s):

- Intercity services (IC-16) Brussels - Namur - Arlon - Luxembourg
- Intercity services (IC-17) Brussels Airport - Brussels-Luxembourg - Namur - Dinant (weekdays)
- Intercity services (IC-17) Brussels - Namur - Dinant (weekends)
- Intercity services (IC-18) Brussels - Namur - Liege (weekdays)
- Intercity services (IC-27) Brussels Airport - Brussels-Luxembourg - Nivelles - Charleroi (weekdays)
- Brussels GEN/RER services (S4) Aalst - Denderleeuw - Brussels-Luxembourg (- Etterbeek - Merode - Vilvoorde) (weekdays)
- Brussels GEN/RER services (S5) Mechelen - Brussels-Luxembourg - Etterbeek - Halle - Enghien (- Geraardsbergen) (weekdays)
- Brussels GEN/RER services (S8) Brussels - Etterbeek - Ottignies - Louvain-la-Neuve
- Brussels GEN/RER services (S9) Leuven - Brussels-Luxembourg - Etterbeek - Braine-l'Alleud (weekdays, peak hours only)
- Brussels GEN/RER services (S81) Schaarbeek - Brussels-Luxembourg - Etterbeek - Ottignies (weekdays, peak hours only)

Preceding station	NMBS/SNCB	Following station
Brussels-Schuman towards Bruxelles-Midi / Brussel-Zuid	IC 16	Ottignies towards Luxembourg
Brussels-Schuman towards Brussels National Airport	IC 17 weekdays	Etterbeek towards Dinant
Brussels-Schuman towards Bruxelles-Midi / Brussel-Zuid	IC 17 weekends	Etterbeek towards Dinant
Brussels-Schuman towards Bruxelles-Midi / Brussel-Zuid	IC 18 weekdays	Etterbeek towards Liège-Saint-Lambert
Brussels-Schuman towards Brussels National Airport	IC 27 weekdays	Etterbeek towards Charleroi-Sud
Brussels-Schuman towards Aalst	S 4 weekdays	Terminus
Brussels-Schuman towards Aalst	S 4 weekdays, peak hours only	Etterbeek towards Mechelen
Brussels-Schuman towards Mechelen	S 5 weekdays	Mouterij towards Enghien
Brussels-Schuman towards Bruxelles-Midi / Brussel-Zuid	S 8	Etterbeek towards Louvain-la-Neuve
Brussels-Schuman towards Leuven	S 9 weekdays	Mouterij towards Braine-l'Alleud
Brussels-Schuman towards Schaarbeek	S 81 weekdays	Etterbeek towards Ottignies

== See also ==
- List of railway stations in Belgium
- Rail transport in Belgium
- Transport in Brussels
- History of Brussels
