= Merode station =

Railway and metro station in Brussels, Belgium

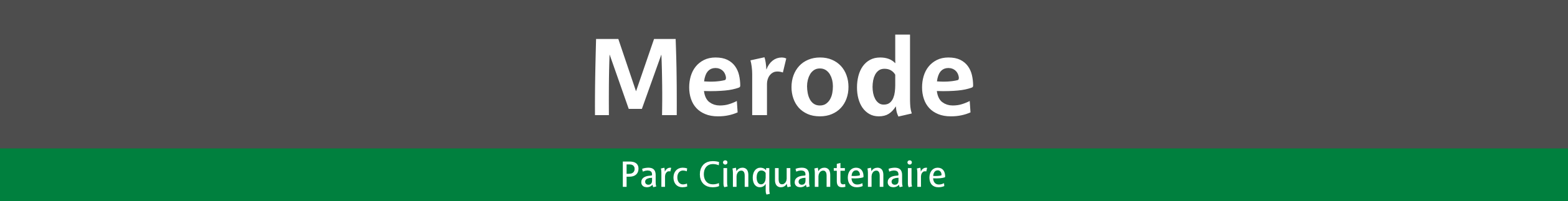

- Merode metro station

General information
- Location: Avenue de Tervueren / Tervurenlaan; 1040 Etterbeek, Brussels-Capital Region, Belgium
- Coordinates: 50°50′22″N 4°23′52″E
- Owner: STIB/MIVB

Construction
- Platform levels: 2

History
- Opened: 20 September 1976; 50 years ago

Services
Preceding station	NMBS/SNCB	Following station
Meiser towards Mechelen	S 4 weekdays	Delta towards Aalst
Meiser towards Vilvoorde	S 7 weekdays	Delta towards Halle
Preceding station	Brussels Metro	Following station
Schuman towards Gare de l'Ouest/Weststation	Line 1	Montgomery towards Stockel/Stokkel
Schuman towards Erasme/Erasmus	Line 5	Thieffry towards Herrmann-Debroux
Location

Merode is a railway and metro station in Brussels, Belgium. It lies in the municipality of Etterbeek, near the border between Etterbeek, the City of Brussels and Schaerbeek. The metro end is under the Porte de Tervueren/Tervuursepoort, which is the start of the Avenue de Tervueren/Tervurenlaan, a major thoroughfare, while the mainline railway station end is under the Square Princesse Jean de Mérode/Prinses Jean de Mérodeplein. The two stations are connected by a long underground concourse punctuated by ticket barriers. The area is named in honour of Princess Jean de Mérode.

== Metro station ==
Merode station opened in 1976 and was served by the first heavy metro service ever in Brussels (earlier underground services elsewhere were operated by trams). The station is located at the eastern end of the common branch of lines 1 and 5. One metro train out of two coming from Schuman continues to the south-east of the city through Thieffry towards Herrmann-Debroux in the municipality of Auderghem; this branch is currently line 5. Line 1 continues to the east through Montgomery towards Stokkel/Stockel in the municipality of Woluwe-Saint-Pierre.

The station is unusual in having its eastbound and westbound tracks one on top of the other, which avoids an at-grade fork. As a result, each platform faces a blank wall across the track, which has been decorated with tiling to improve the station's atmosphere. Originally, it was planned to be underneath the building of the Bank Bruxelles Lambert. Due to security issues, this idea was not fully implemented. However, leftovers of this idea are still visible in the building.

== Railway station ==
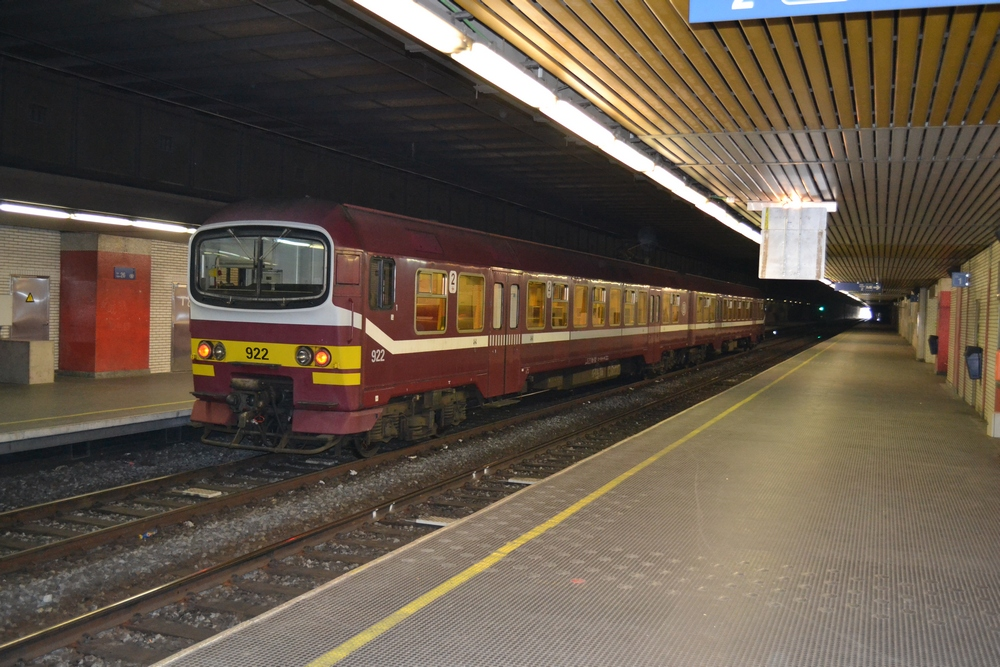
Line 26 service en route for Halle

The underground railway station has two tracks with two side platforms and is served by the suburban services of the National Railway Company of Belgium (NMBS/SNCB)'s line 26, as part of the Brussels Regional Express Network (RER/GEN) services.

=== Train services ===
The station is served by the following service(s):

- Brussels RER services (S4) Mechelen - Vilvoorde - Merode - Etterbeek - Brussels-Luxembourg - Denderleeuw - Aalst (weekdays)
- Brussels RER services (S7) Vilvoorde - Arcaden - Halle (weekdays)

== Area ==
Several places of interest are located around this station among which the Cauchie House (house of the architect Paul Cauchie), the Parc du Cinquantenaire/Jubelpark, the Avenue de Tervueren/Tervurenlaan (one of the oldest avenues in Brussels) and the Royal Military Academy. The station offers a connection with the Brussels tram route 81 as well as the bus routes 61 and 80.

== See also ==
- Transport in Brussels
- History of Brussels
