= Etterbeek railway station =

Railway station in Brussels, Belgium

Etterbeek
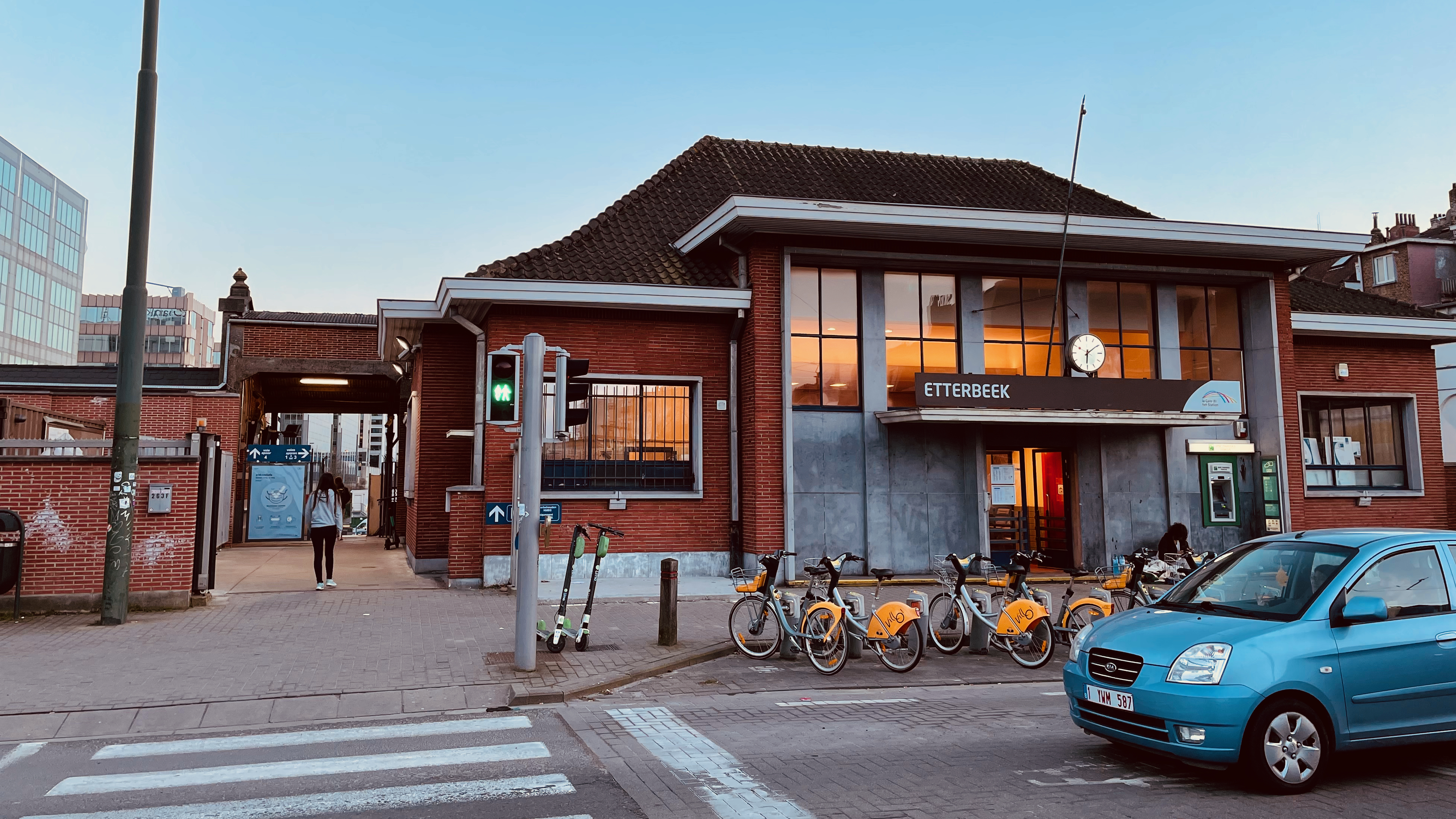

General information
- Location: Boulevard Général Jacques / Generaal Jacqueslaan; 1050 Ixelles, Brussels-Capital Region; Belgium
- Coordinates: 50°49′20″N 4°23′22″E
- System: Railway Station
- Owner: SNCB/NMBS
- Operator: SNCB/NMBS
- Lines: 161, 26
- Platforms: 4

Other information
- Station code: MTB
- Fare zone: Brussels

History
- Opened: 25 September 1880; 145 years ago
- Closed: 1992 (goods)
Location
- Location within Belgium Location within Europe

Etterbeek railway station (French: Gare d'Etterbeek; Dutch: Station Etterbeek) (Note: Officially Etterbeek) is a railway station in Brussels, Belgium, operated by the National Railway Company of Belgium (NMBS/SNCB). The station is named after the municipality of Etterbeek, though it is located in neighbouring Ixelles, at the Couronne/Kroon crossroad on the Greater Ring. It first opened in 1880, and was, as of 2007, the 29th most used railway station in Belgium, with 5,565 passengers per day. In 2014, the station was used by 4,766 passengers on weekdays.

The station is located on line 161, between Germoir/Mouterij and Watermael railway stations. Some trains from line 26 also call at this station between Delta and Boondael.

== Train services ==
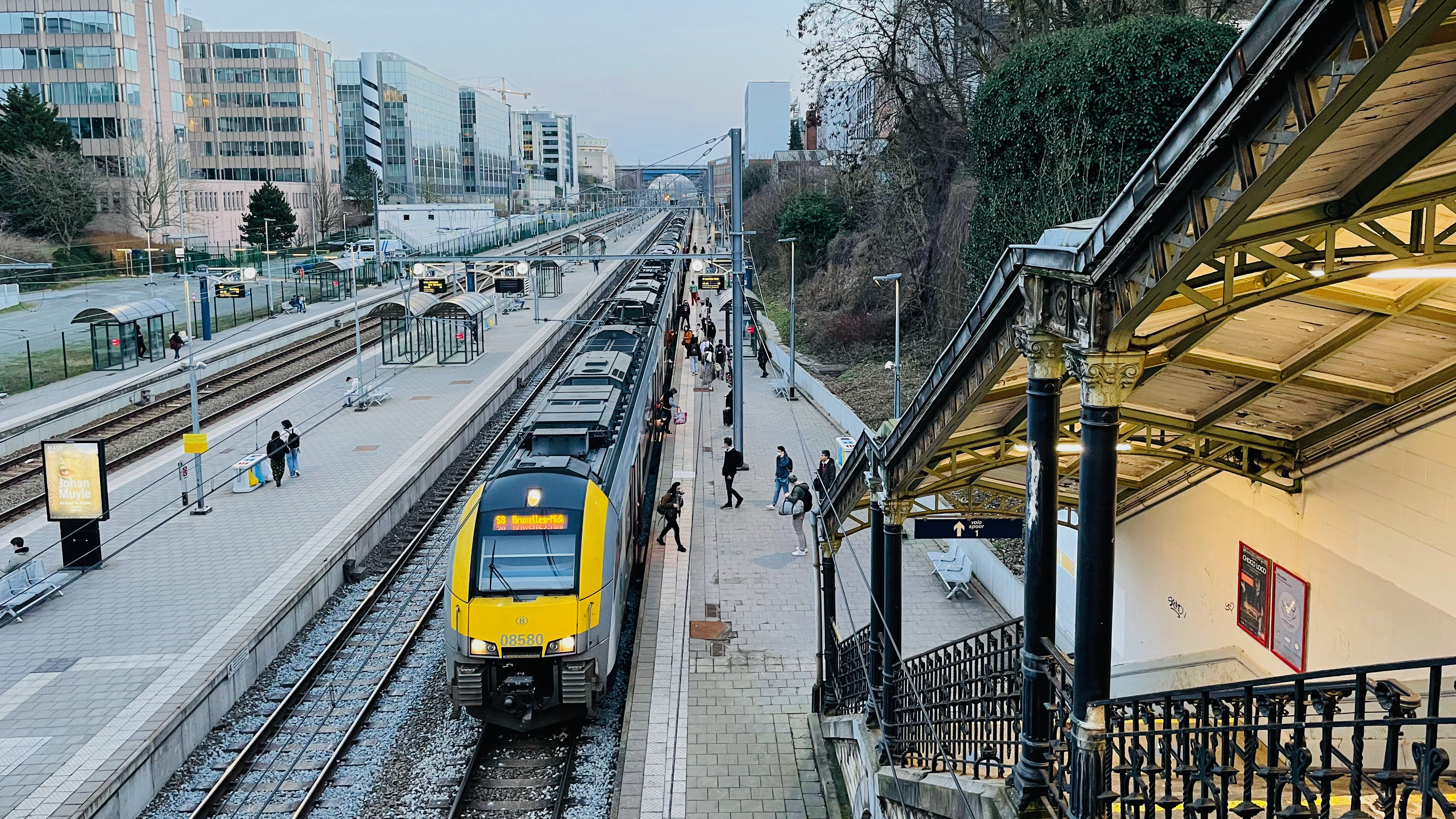
Etterbeek station, with view on tracks

The station is served by the following service(s):

- Intercity services (IC-17) Brussels Airport - Brussels-Luxembourg - Namur - Dinant (weekdays)
- Intercity services (IC-17) Brussels - Namur - Dinant (weekends)
- Intercity services (IC-18) Brussels - Namur - Liege (weekdays)
- Intercity services (IC-27) Brussels Airport - Brussels-Luxembourg - Nivelles - Charleroi (weekdays)
- Brussels RER/GEN services (S4) Vilvoorde - Merode - Etterbeek - Brussels-Luxembourg - Denderleeuw - Aalst (weekdays, peak hours only)
- Brussels RER/GEN services (S5) Mechelen - Brussels-Luxembourg - Etterbeek - Halle - Enghien (- Geraardsbergen) (weekdays)
- Brussels RER/GEN services (S8) Brussels - Etterbeek - Ottignies - Louvain-le-Neuve
- Brussels RER/GEN services (S9) Leuven - Brussels-Luxembourg - Etterbeek - Braine-l'Alleud (weekdays, peak hours only)
- Brussels RER/GEN services (S81) Schaarbeek - Brussels-Luxembourg - Etterbeek - Ottignies (weekdays, peak hours only)

Preceding station	NMBS/SNCB	Following station
Brussels-Luxembourg towards Brussels National Airport	IC 17 weekdays	Ottignies towards Dinant
Brussels-Luxembourg towards Bruxelles-Midi / Brussel-Zuid	IC 17 weekends	Ottignies towards Dinant
Brussels-Luxembourg towards Bruxelles-Midi / Brussel-Zuid	IC 18 weekdays	Ottignies towards Liège-Saint-Lambert
Brussels-Luxembourg towards Brussels National Airport	IC 27 weekdays	Boondael towards Charleroi-Sud
Brussels-Luxembourg towards Aalst	S 4 weekdays	Delta towards Mechelen
Germoir towards Mechelen	S 5 weekdays	Boondael towards Enghien
Brussels-Luxembourg towards Bruxelles-Midi / Brussel-Zuid	S 8	Watermael towards Louvain-la-Neuve
Germoir towards Leuven	S 9 weekdays	Boondael towards Braine-l'Alleud
Brussels-Luxembourg towards Schaarbeek	S 81 weekdays	Watermael towards Ottignies

== See also ==
- List of railway stations in Belgium
- Rail transport in Belgium
- Transport in Brussels
- History of Brussels
