= Boondael railway station =

Railway station in Brussels, Belgium

Coordinates: 50.8018°N 4.3935°E

Boondael Boondaal
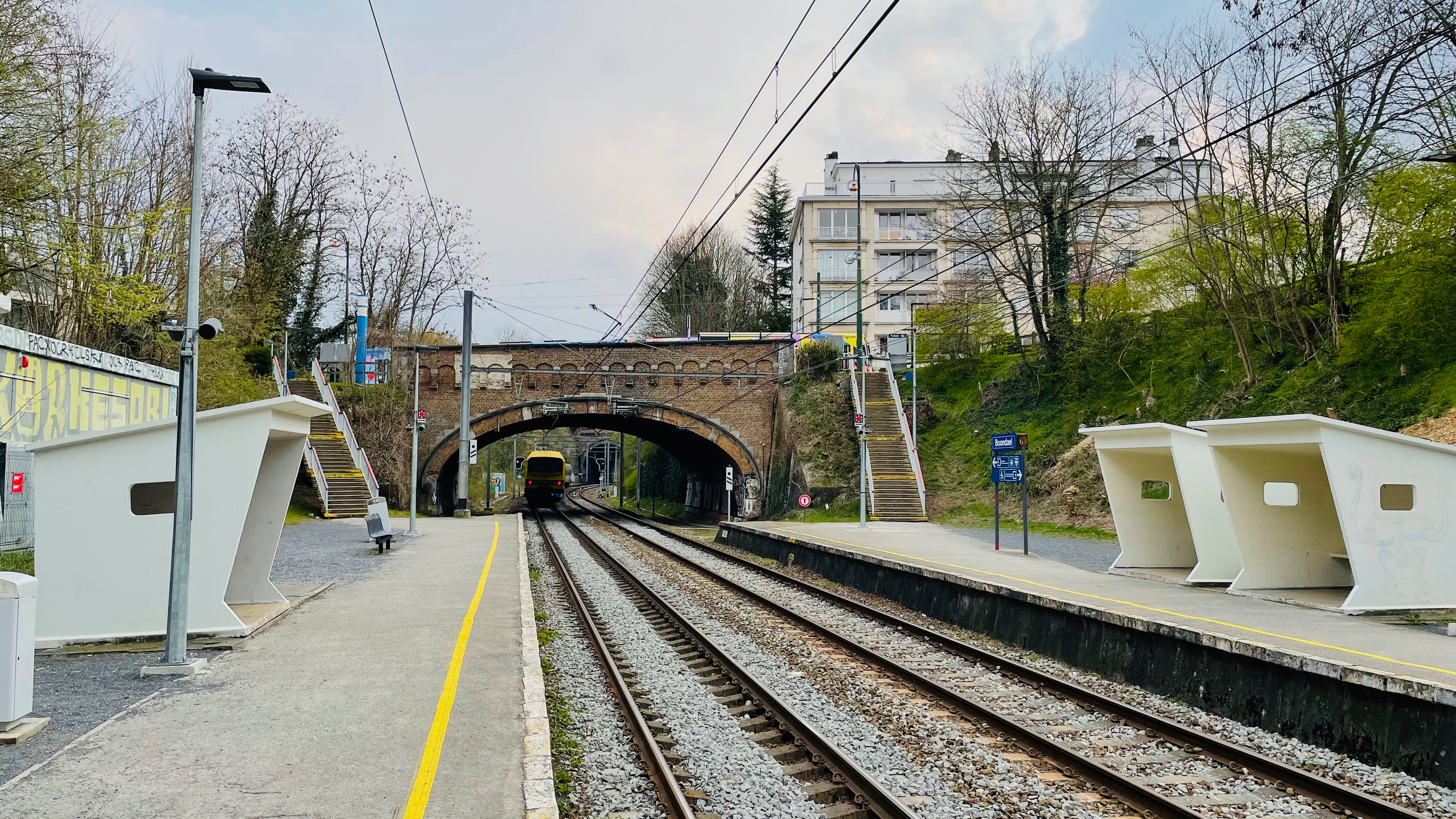
- Boondael/Boondaal railway station

General information
- Location: Ixelles, Brussels-Capital Region; Belgium
- System: Railway Station
- Owner: SNCB/NMBS
- Operator: SNCB/NMBS
- Line: 26
- Platforms: 2
- Tracks: 2

Other information
- Station code: (H)

Passengers
- 2014: 927 per day
Location
- Location within Belgium Location within Europe

Boondael railway station (French: Gare de Boondael) or Boondaal railway station (Dutch: Station Boondaal) (Note: Officially Boondael/Boondaal (French: Boondael; Dutch: Boondaal)) is a railway station in the municipality of Ixelles in Brussels, Belgium, operated by the National Railway Company of Belgium (NMBS/SNCB). The station lies on line 26, between Delta and Vivier d'Oie railway stations, respectively in Auderghem and Uccle.

The station offers a connection with Brussels tram routes 8 and 25. The stop is the terminus of route 25.

== Train services ==
The station is served by the following service(s):

- Intercity services (IC-27) Brussels Airport - Brussels-Luxembourg - Nivelles - Charleroi (weekdays)
- Brussels RER services (S5) Mechelen - Brussels-Luxembourg - Etterbeek - Halle - Enghien (- Geraardsbergen) (weekdays)
- Brussels RER services (S7) Mechelen - Merode - Halle (weekdays)
- Brussels RER services (S9) Leuven - Brussels-Luxembourg - Etterbeek - Braine-l'Alleud (weekdays, peak hours only)

Preceding station	NMBS/SNCB	Following station
Etterbeek towards Brussels National Airport	IC 27 weekdays	Vivier d'Oie towards Charleroi-Sud
Etterbeek towards Mechelen	S 5 weekdays	Vivier d'Oie towards Enghien
Delta towards Vilvoorde	S 7 weekdays	Vivier d'Oie towards Halle
Etterbeek towards Leuven	S 9 weekdays	Vivier d'Oie towards Braine-l'Alleud

== See also ==
- List of railway stations in Belgium
- Rail transport in Belgium
- Transport in Brussels
- History of Brussels
