= Schuman railway station =

Railway station in Brussels, Belgium

Brussels-Schuman
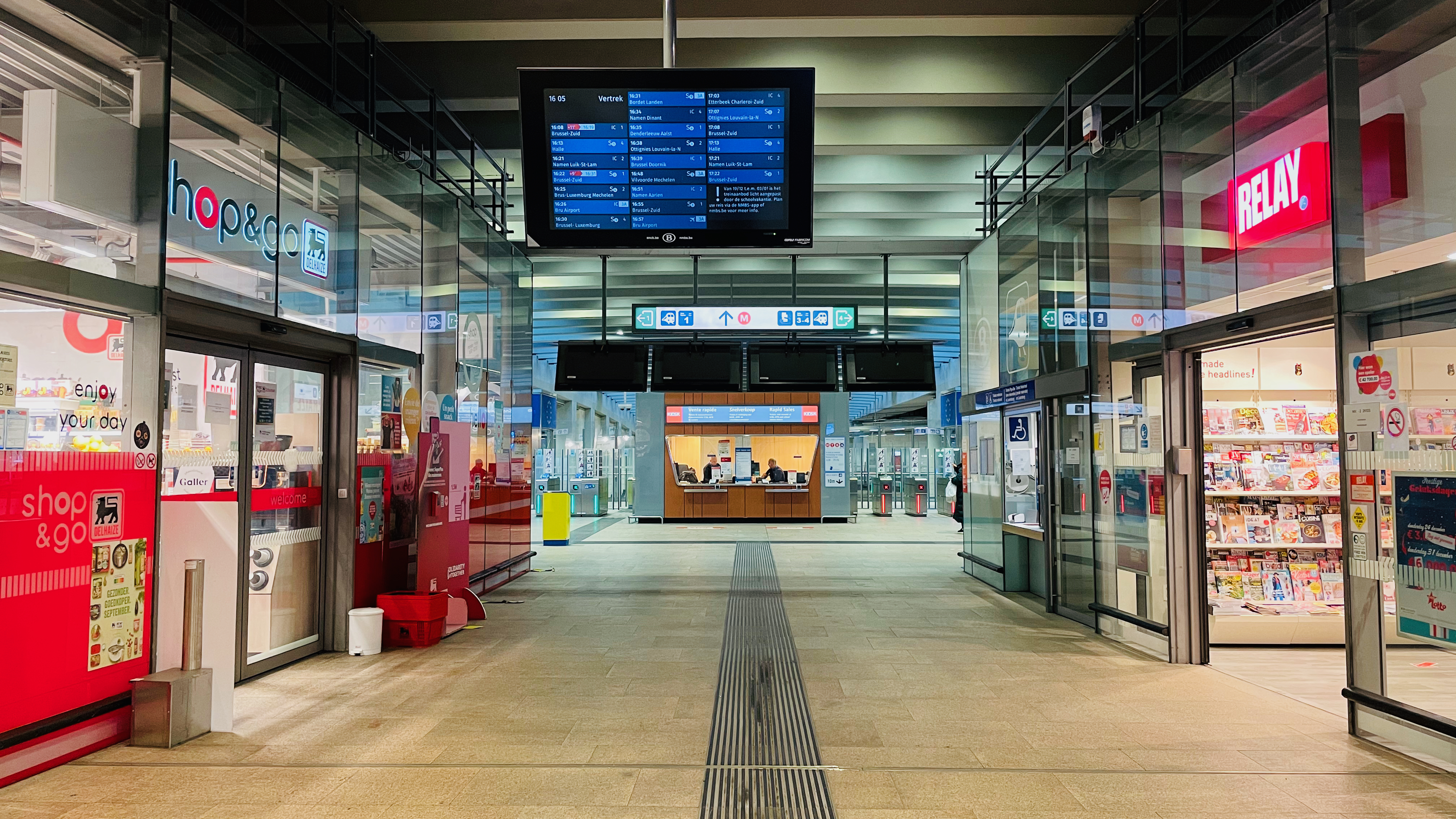
- Brussels-Schuman railway station

General information
- Location: Rue de la Loi / Wetstraat; 1040 City of Brussels, Brussels-Capital Region; Belgium
- Coordinates: 50°50′34″N 4°22′54″E
- System: Railway Station
- Owner: SNCB/NMBS
- Operator: SNCB/NMBS
- Connections: Brussels Metro: 1 5 (at metro station)

Other information
- Station code: BXLS

History
- Opened: 17 December 1969; 56 years ago
Location
- Location within Belgium Location within Europe

Brussels-Schuman railway station (French: Gare de Bruxelles-Schuman; Dutch: Station Brussel-Schuman) (Note: Officially Brussels-Schuman (French: Bruxelles-Schuman; Dutch: Brussel-Schuman)) is a railway station in the City of Brussels, Belgium, serving the European Quarter. The station received its name from the aboveground Robert Schuman Roundabout, itself named after Robert Schuman, one of the founding fathers of the European Union, the Council of Europe and NATO.

Underneath Brussels-Schuman is the rapid transit Schuman station on lines 1 and 5 of the Brussels Metro system, which serves as an important node of the Brussels Intercommunal Transport Company (STIB/MIVB).

== History ==
The original railway line through the station site ran between Brussels-Luxembourg and Brussels-North and was opened on 23 October 1856, though no station was provided. In about 1865, the Grande Compagnie du Luxembourg received subsidies from the state to open stations on the line, by that point surrounded by rapid housing development, and opened a halt called Bruxelles (Rue de la Loi), on a site now occupied by part of the Berlaymont building. The station was closed around 1920.

The site was identified as a future rail and metro connection during the planning and construction of the Berlaymont and Charlemagne buildings, and opened for rail and premetro (underground tram) services on 17 December 1969. The premetro trams were replaced by the new Brussels Metro on 20 September 1976.

From 2008 to 2016, the metro and railway stations underwent major renovation works, increasing the station's capacity by two extra tracks. These connect to a tunnel to the old Schaerbeek-Josaphat station (and marshalling yard) on line 26, in order to offer direct quick connections to Antwerp, Leuven and Brussels Airport. With this third connection, the station has become one of Brussels' largest. Its new glass roof allows more daylight into the station.

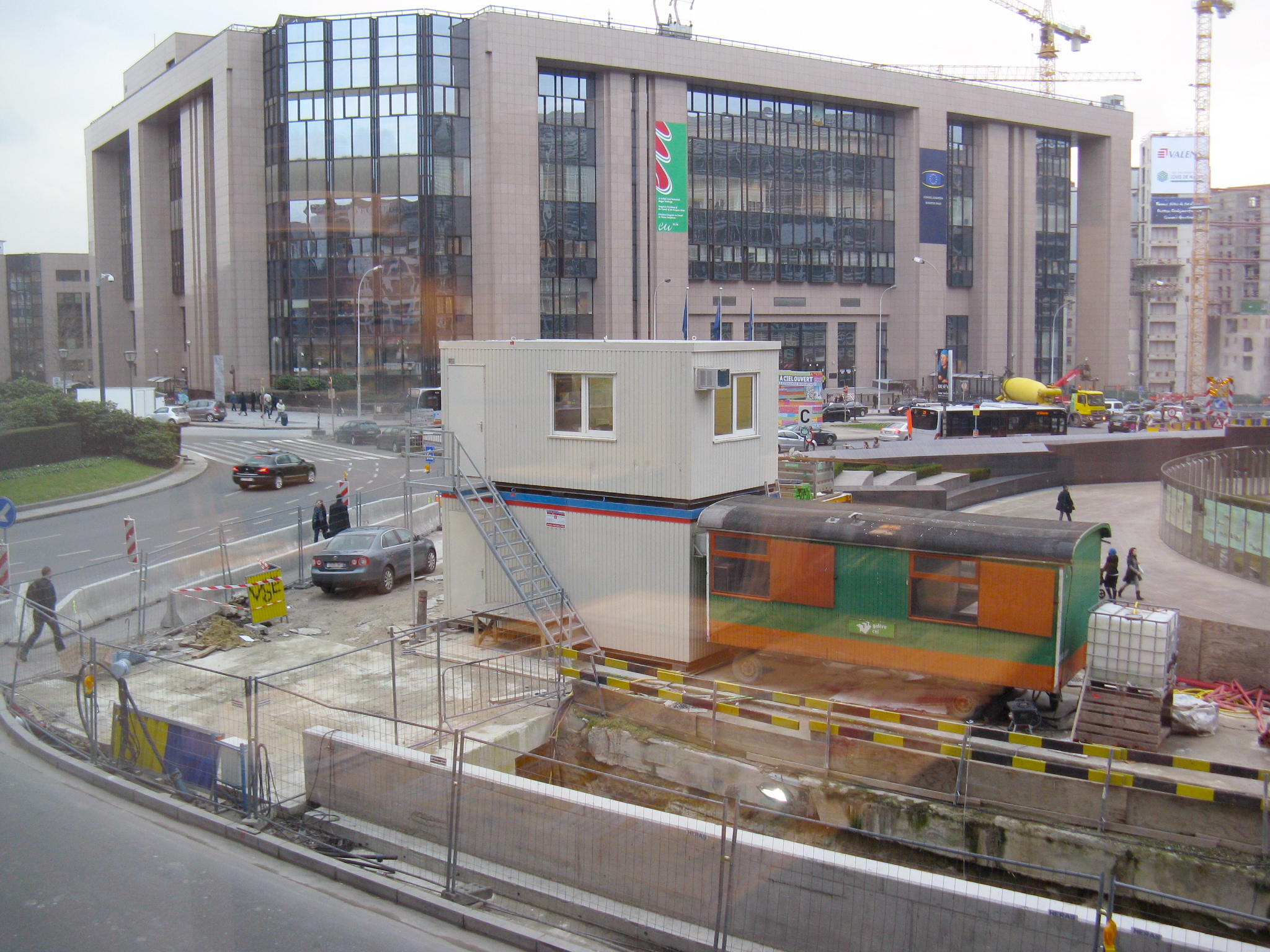
Above ground works, during winter 2011. The Europa building is under construction in the background.

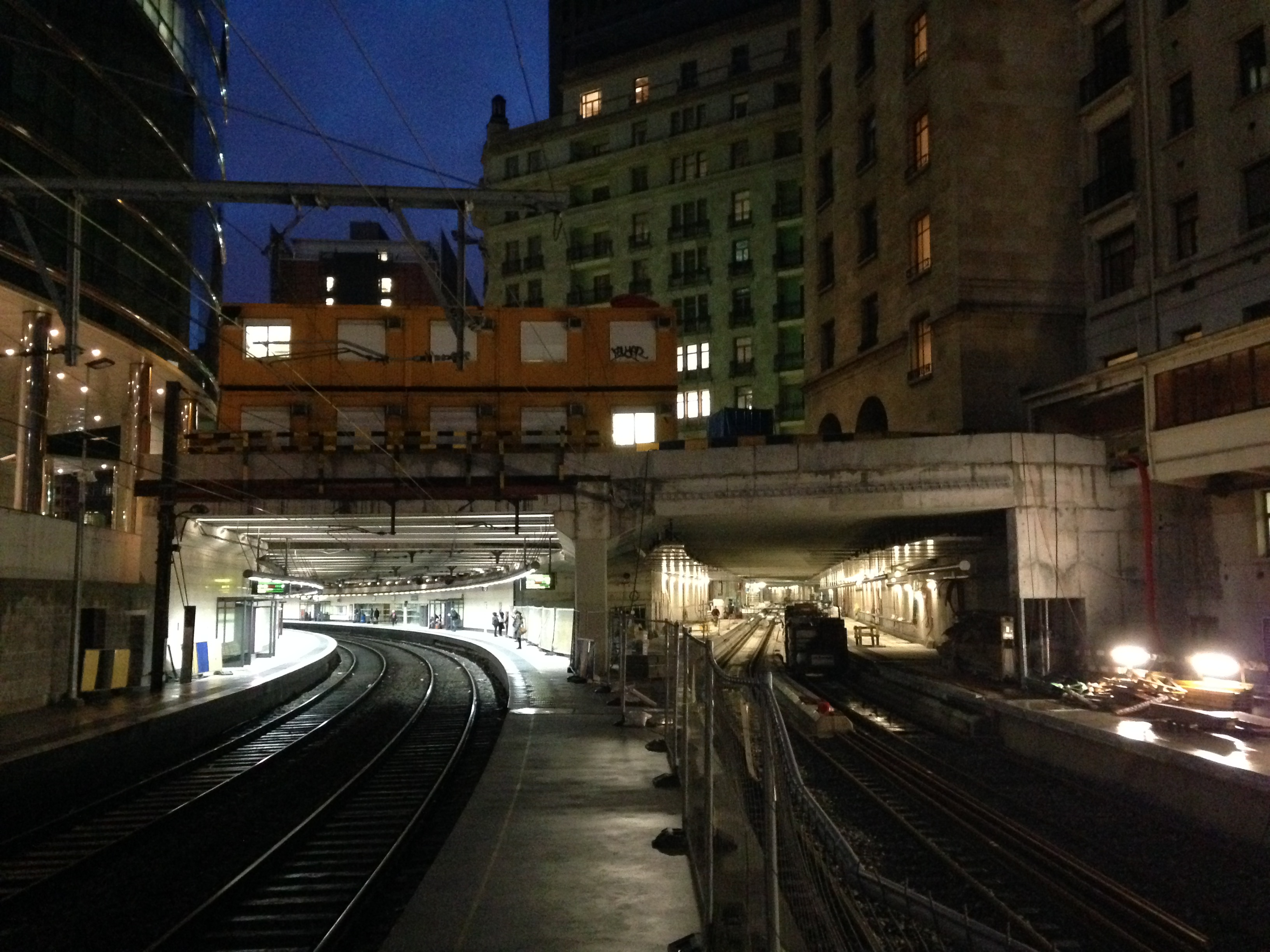
Looking into the new tunnel with the newly laid tracks in January 2015

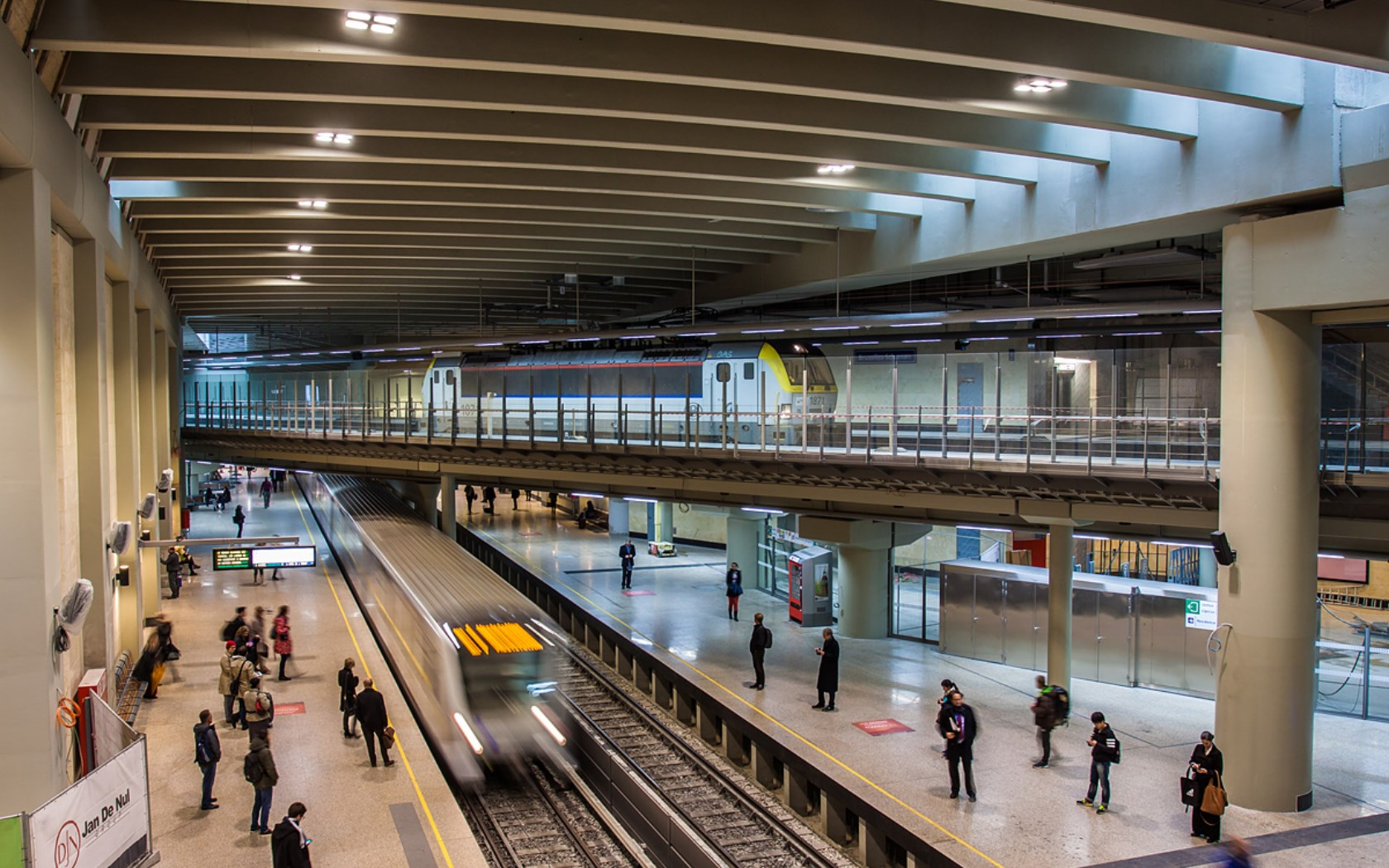
Test train on the new tracks crossing the metro hall in October 2015

== Rail ==
The rail station (called Bruxelles-Schuman/Brussel-Schuman) is an elevated station, though its north-eastern end is "underground" as it enters a hillside. Its ticket office is located immediately next to the metro station; at one end of the railway station platforms, a stairway leads down to the Chaussée d'Etterbeek/Etterbeeksesteenweg, coming out close to Maelbeek/Maalbeek metro station. Trains travelling between Brussels-South railway station and Namur and Luxembourg call at the station. The National Railway Company of Belgium (NMBS/SNCB)'s code for the station is FBSM.

A new tunnel was opened in April 2016 between Brussels-Schuman and Meiser, providing direct connections to Brussels Airport and stations on the Greater Ring of Brussels.

== Train services ==
The station is served by the following service(s):

- Intercity services (IC-16) Brussels - Namur - Arlon - Luxembourg
- Intercity services (IC-17) Brussels Airport - Brussels-Luxembourg - Namur - Dinant (weekdays)
- Intercity services (IC-17) Brussels - Namur - Dinant (weekends)
- Intercity services (IC-18) Brussels - Namur - Liege (weekdays)
- Intercity services (IC-27) Brussels Airport - Brussels-Luxembourg - Nivelles - Charleroi (weekdays)
- Brussels RER services (S4) Aalst - Denderleeuw - Brussels-Luxembourg (- Etterbeek - Merode - Vilvoorde) (weekdays)
- Brussels RER services (S5) Mechelen - Brussels-Luxembourg - Etterbeek - Halle - Enghien (- Geraardsbergen) (weekdays)
- Brussels RER services (S8) Brussels - Etterbeek - Ottignies - Louvain-la-Neuve
- Brussels RER services (S9) Leuven - Brussels-Luxembourg - Etterbeek - Braine-l'Alleud (weekdays, peak hours only)
- Brussels RER services (S81) Schaarbeek - Brussels-Luxembourg - Etterbeek - Ottignies (weekdays, peak hours only)

Preceding station	NMBS/SNCB	Following station
Bruxelles-Nord / Brussel-Noord towards Bruxelles-Midi / Brussel-Zuid	IC 16	Brussels-Luxembourg towards Luxembourg
Bordet towards Brussels National Airport	IC 17 weekdays	Brussels-Luxembourg towards Dinant
Bruxelles-Nord / Brussel-Noord towards Bruxelles-Midi / Brussel-Zuid	IC 17 weekends	Brussels-Luxembourg towards Dinant
Bruxelles-Nord / Brussel-Noord towards Bruxelles-Midi / Brussel-Zuid	IC 18 weekdays	Brussels-Luxembourg towards Liège-Saint-Lambert
Bordet towards Brussels National Airport	IC 27 weekdays	Brussels-Luxembourg towards Charleroi-Sud
Bockstael towards Aalst	S 4 weekdays	Brussels-Luxembourg towards Mechelen
Meiser towards Mechelen	S 5 weekdays	Brussels-Luxembourg towards Enghien
Bruxelles-Nord / Brussel-Noord towards Bruxelles-Midi / Brussel-Zuid	S 8	Brussels-Luxembourg towards Louvain-la-Neuve
Meiser towards Leuven	S 9 weekdays	Mouterij towards Braine-l'Alleud
Schaarbeek Terminus	S 81 weekdays	Brussels-Luxembourg towards Ottignies

== Area ==
The station is in the centre of Brussels' European Quarter, being adjacent to the Berlaymont building (headquarters of the European Commission), the Justus Lipsius building (used to hold low-level meetings of the Council of the European Union and provide office space to the Council's Secretariat) and numerous other EU offices. It lies under the Rue de la Loi/Wetstraat, a major city thoroughfare, and is close to the Parc du Cinquantenaire/Jubelpark.

== See also ==
- List of railway stations in Belgium
- Rail transport in Belgium
- Transport in Brussels
- History of Brussels
