= Delta station =

Railway and metro station in Brussels, Belgium

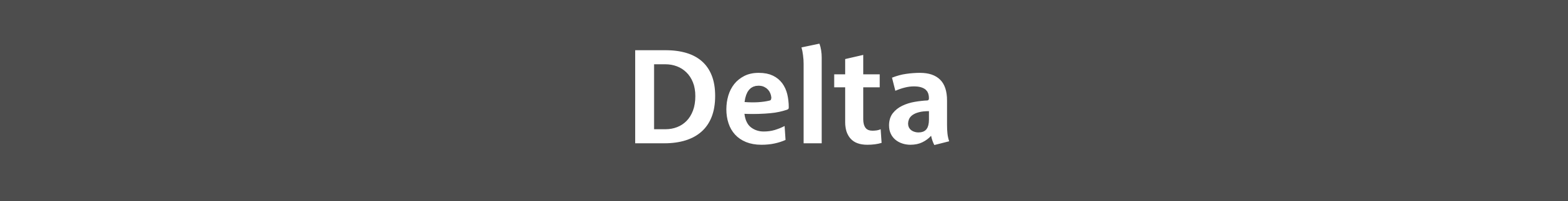

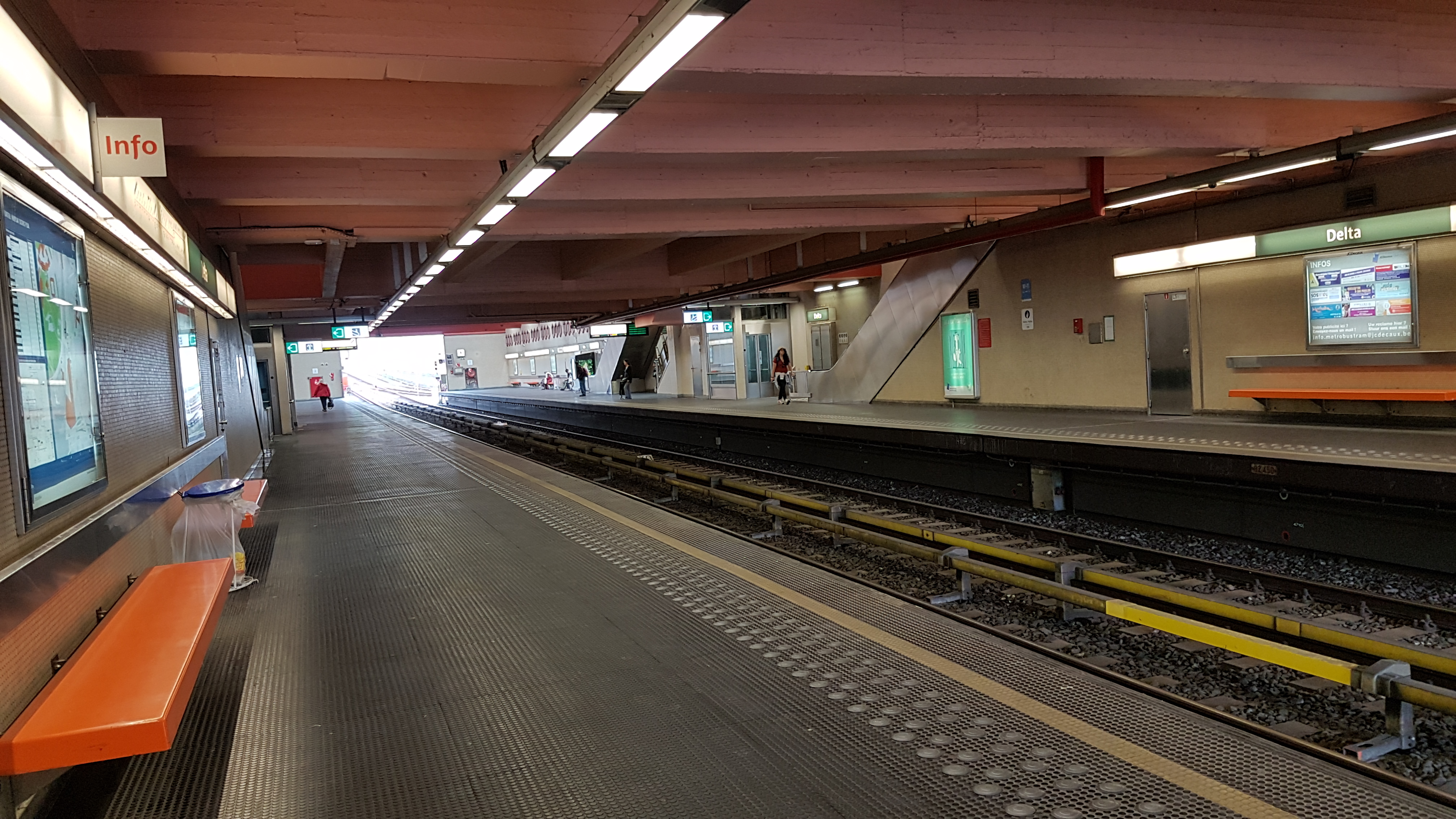
- Delta metro station

General information
- Location: Boulevard des Invalides / Invalidenlaan; 1160 Auderghem, Brussels-Capital Region, Belgium
- Coordinates: 50°49′06″N 4°24′15″E
- Owner: STIB/MIVB

History
- Opened: 20 September 1976; 50 years ago

Services
Preceding station	Brussels Metro	Following station
Hankar towards Erasme/Erasmus	Line 5	Beaulieu towards Herrmann-Debroux
Preceding station	NMBS/SNCB	Following station
Merode towards Mechelen	S 4 weekdays	Etterbeek towards Aalst
Merode towards Vilvoorde	S 7 weekdays	Boondael towards Halle
Location

Delta is a railway and metro station in the municipality of Auderghem, in the south-eastern part of Brussels, Belgium. It is located near the intersection of the Boulevard du Triomphe/Triomflaan and the Boulevard des Invalides/Invalidenlaan, providing access to the adjacent La Plaine/Het Plein campus of the Université libre de Bruxelles (ULB) and to the Etterbeek campus of the Vrije Universiteit Brussel (VUB).

The station was inaugurated on 20 September 1976, as part of the first heavy metro segment of the network, located on the branch from Merode to Beaulieu. Then, following the reorganisation of the Brussels Metro on 4 April 2009, it is served by the extended east–west line 5.

== Name ==
Delta is notable for being the only station in the Brussels Metro network to be named after a feature of itself rather than after a street name, person, neighbourhood, or other adjacent location: The name is derived from the triangular shape of the rail yard as seen from the air, which is reminiscent of the Greek capital letter Delta (Δ).

== Metro station ==
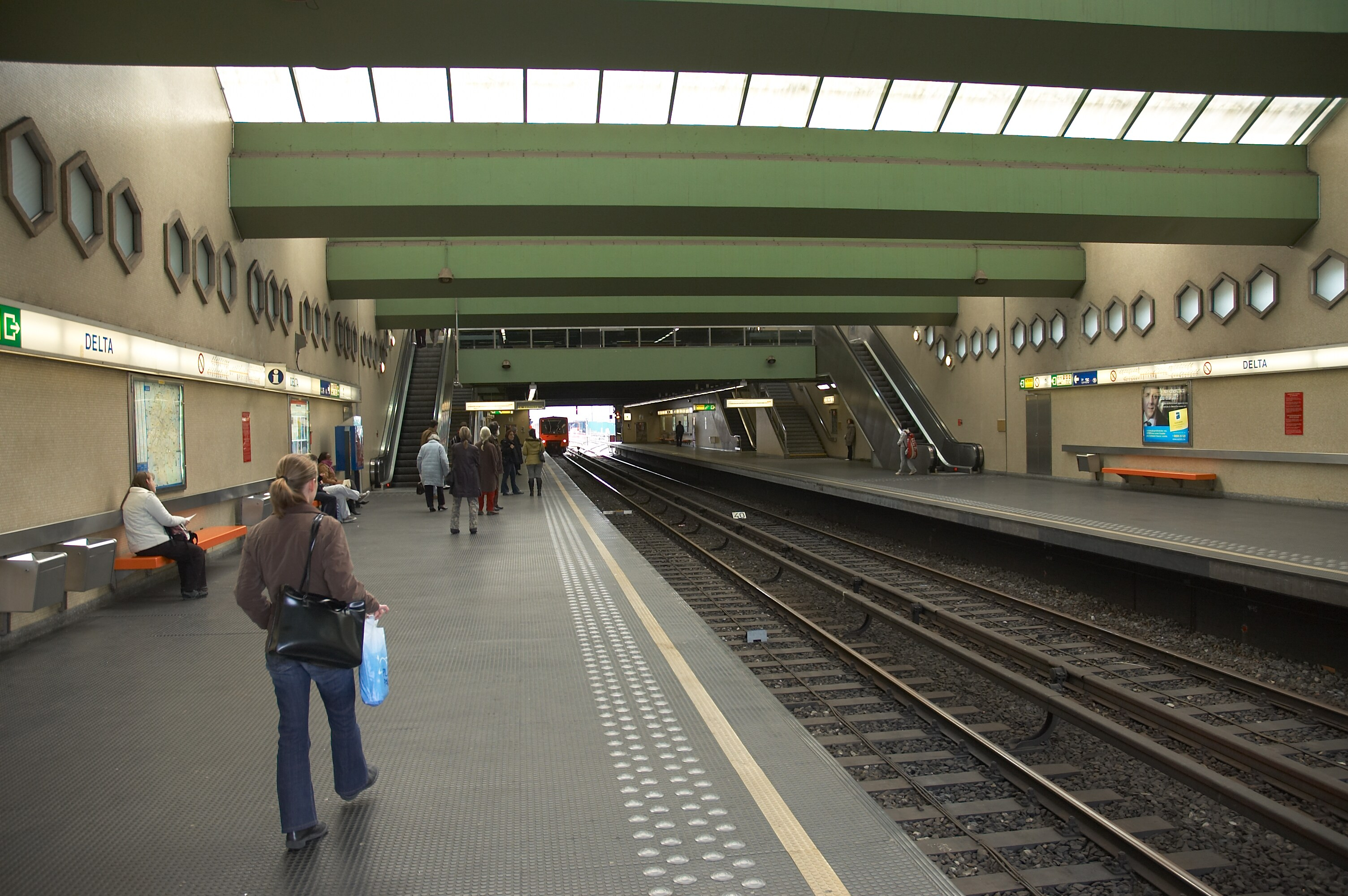
Delta metro station platform facing south-west, March 2008

Delta is one of the oldest stations in the Brussels Metro system. The architect, Jean F. Petit, designed it in the brutalist style. The station was inaugurated on 20 September 1976, as part of the first heavy metro segment of the network on the branch from Merode to Beaulieu.

Following the reorganisation of the Brussels Metro on 4 April 2009, Delta was incorporated into the extended east–west line 5.

In June 2026, Elke van den Brandt, Minister for Mobility, Public Works, and Road Safety in the Brussels-Capital Region, announced that Delta would receive an extensive refurbishment and renovation to coincide with the fiftieth anniversary of its opening.

=== Artworks ===
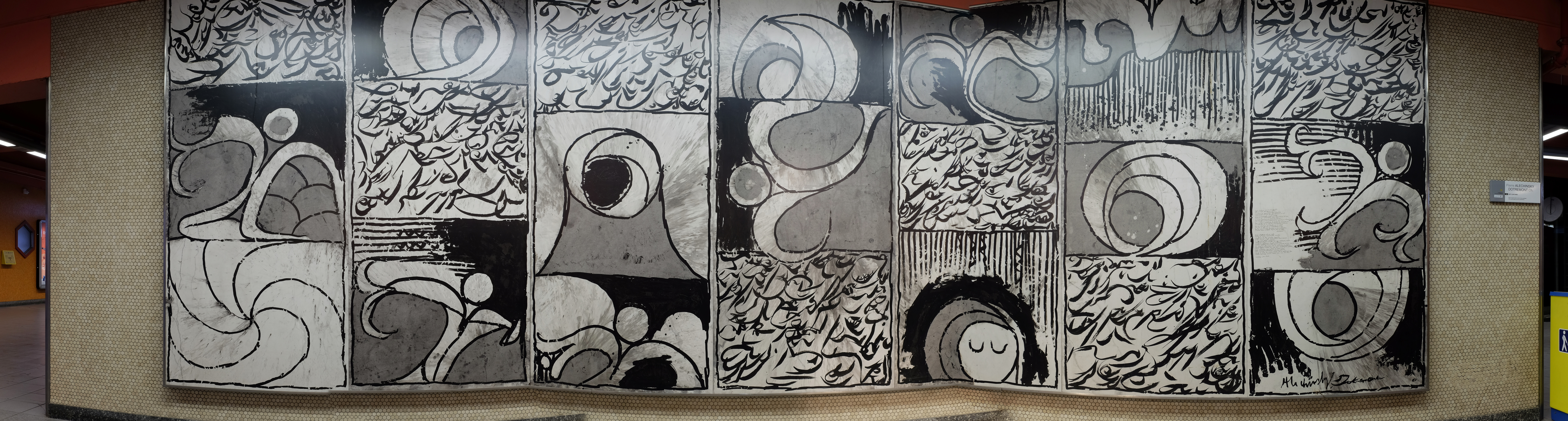
Sept Écritures by Pierre Alechinsky and Christian Dotremont (1976)

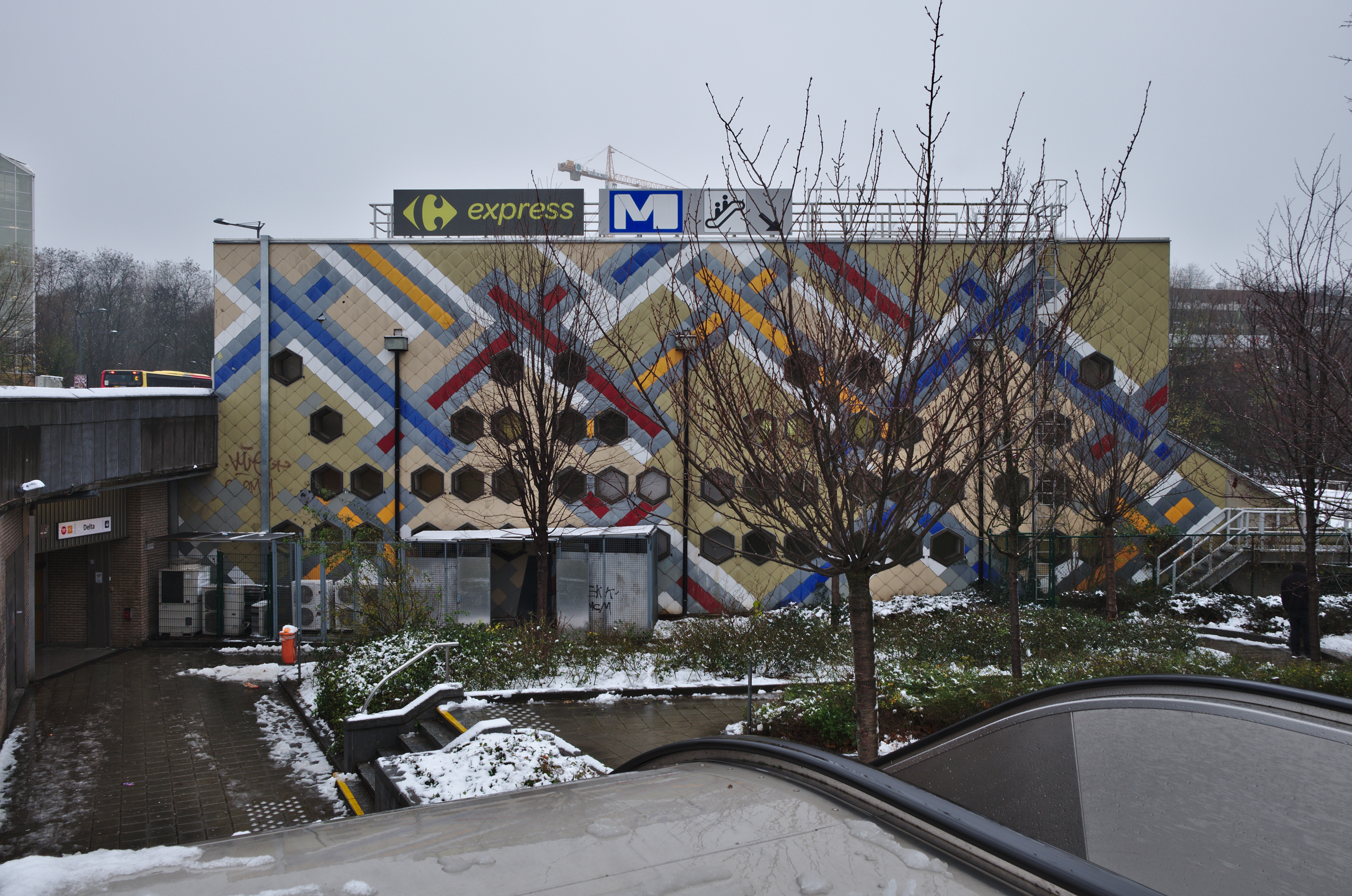
Delta Mouvement by Jan van den Abbeel (1988), at the station's entrance

The mezzanine level features a large-scale work by the artists Pierre Alechinsky and Christian Dotremont titled Sept Écritures. Executed in India ink on paper pressed on wood and synthetic resin, it consists of seven tall panels arranged in horizontal sequence. Each panel is divided into three sections: two images by Alechinsky and a poem by Dotremont written in an invented logographic calligraphy, both relating to themes of shelter and the wheel. The piece was originally installed in Anneessens-Fontainas premetro station in 1976, but was moved to Delta in 2006.

In 1988, the artist Jan van den Abbeel was commissioned to decorate the station's original, bare concrete façade. This piece, titled Delta Mouvement, uses an array of several hundred opaque, diamond-shaped glass panels to form a geometric surface that wraps around the station building. Van den Abbeel used panels of various colours to create an interlocking, alternating weave of diagonal patterns.

== Railway station ==
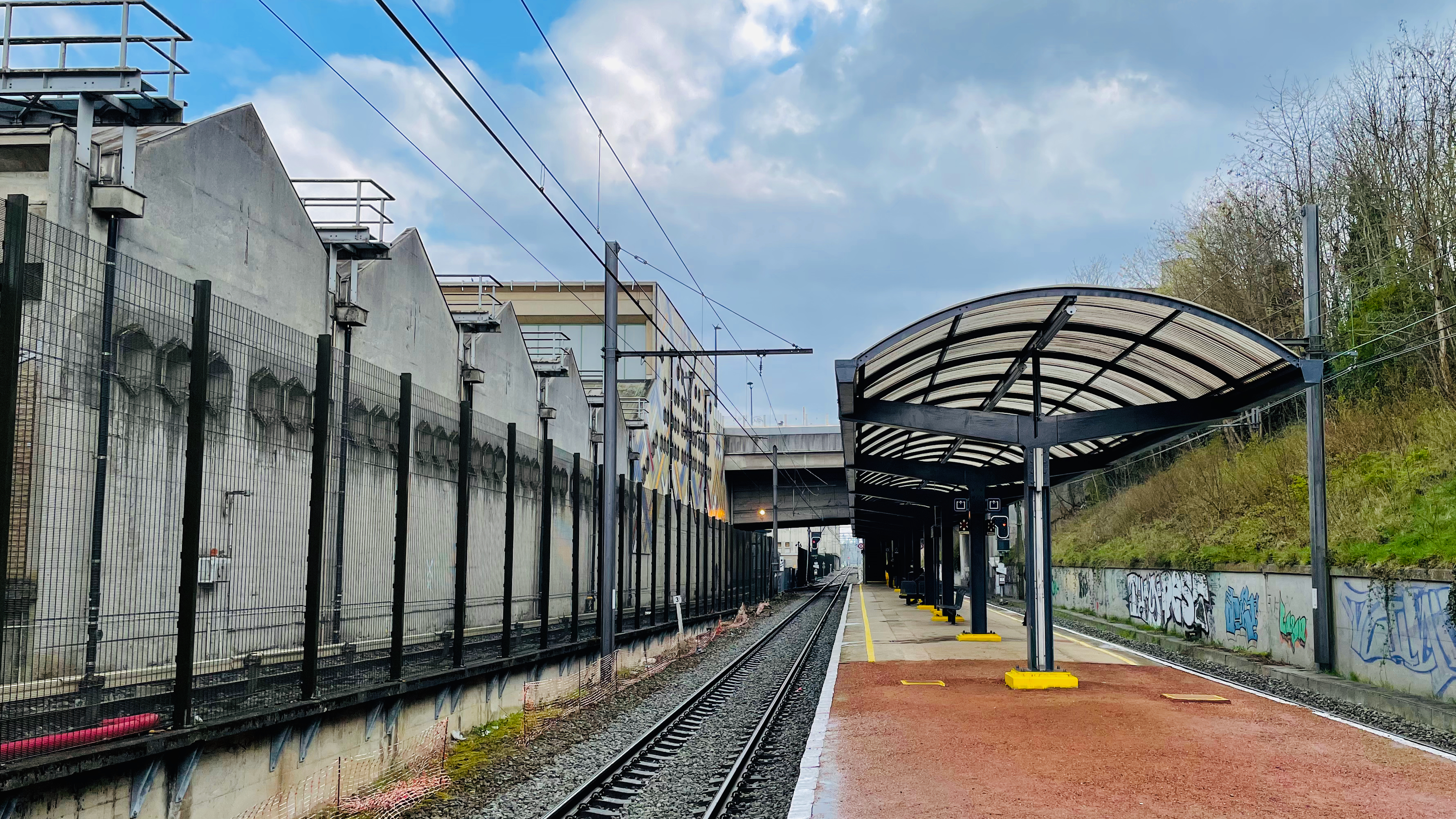
View of Delta station's platforms and tracks

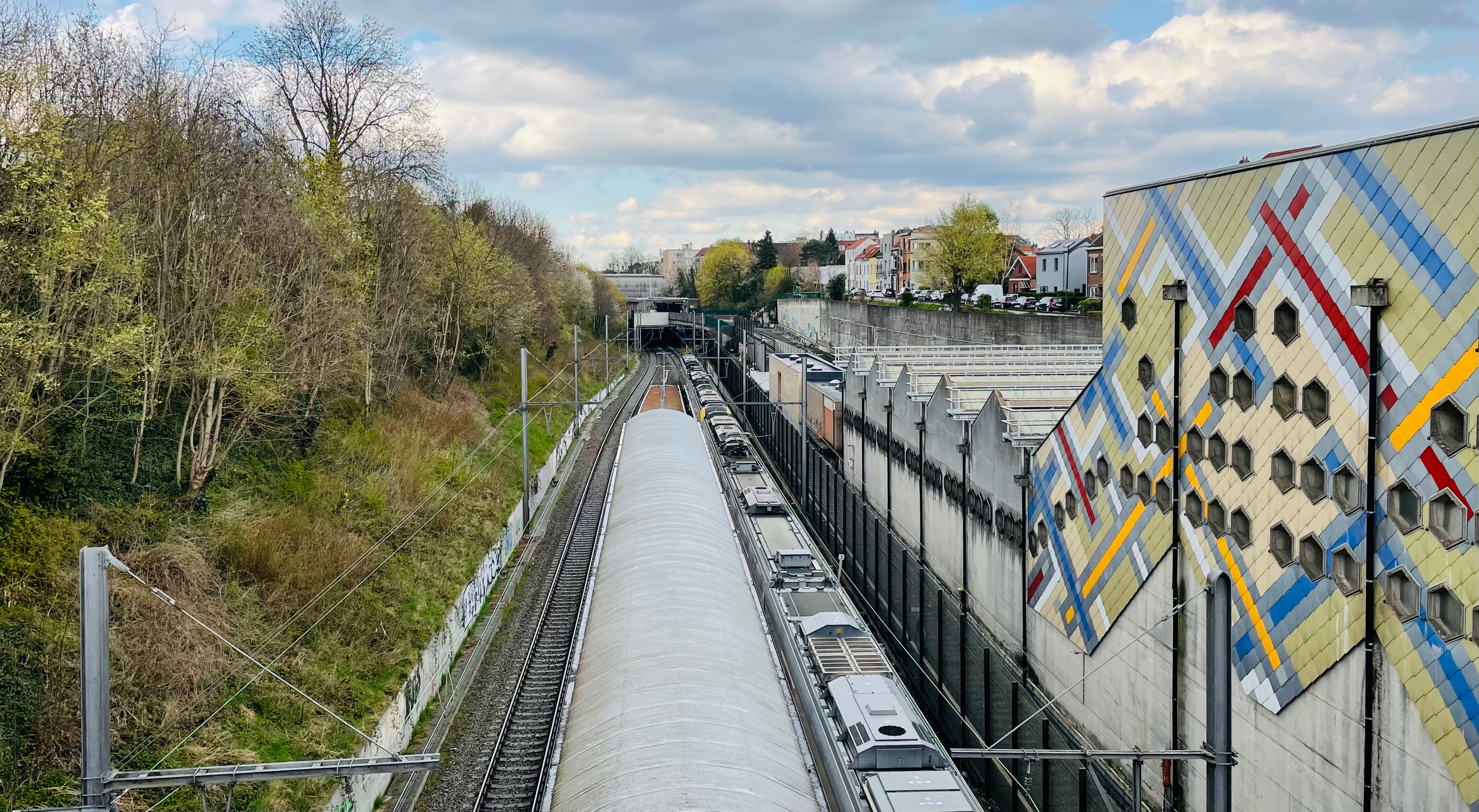
Looking down at the platforms and tracks

Directly adjacent to the metro station, the railway station consists of two platforms served by the suburban commuter services of the National Railway Company of Belgium (NMBS/SNCB)'s line 26, linking Vilvoorde with Halle via Etterbeek. There is a direct link between the metro and railway tracks within the station, enabling transportation of metro rolling stock by way of the Belgian rail network. The railway platforms are directly accessible from the metro station.

=== Train services ===
The station is served by the following service(s):

- Brussels RER services (S4) Vilvoorde - Merode - Etterbeek - Brussels-Luxembourg - Denderleeuw - Aalst (weekdays, peak hours only)
- Brussels RER services (S7) Mechelen - Merode - Halle (weekdays)

== Delta depot ==
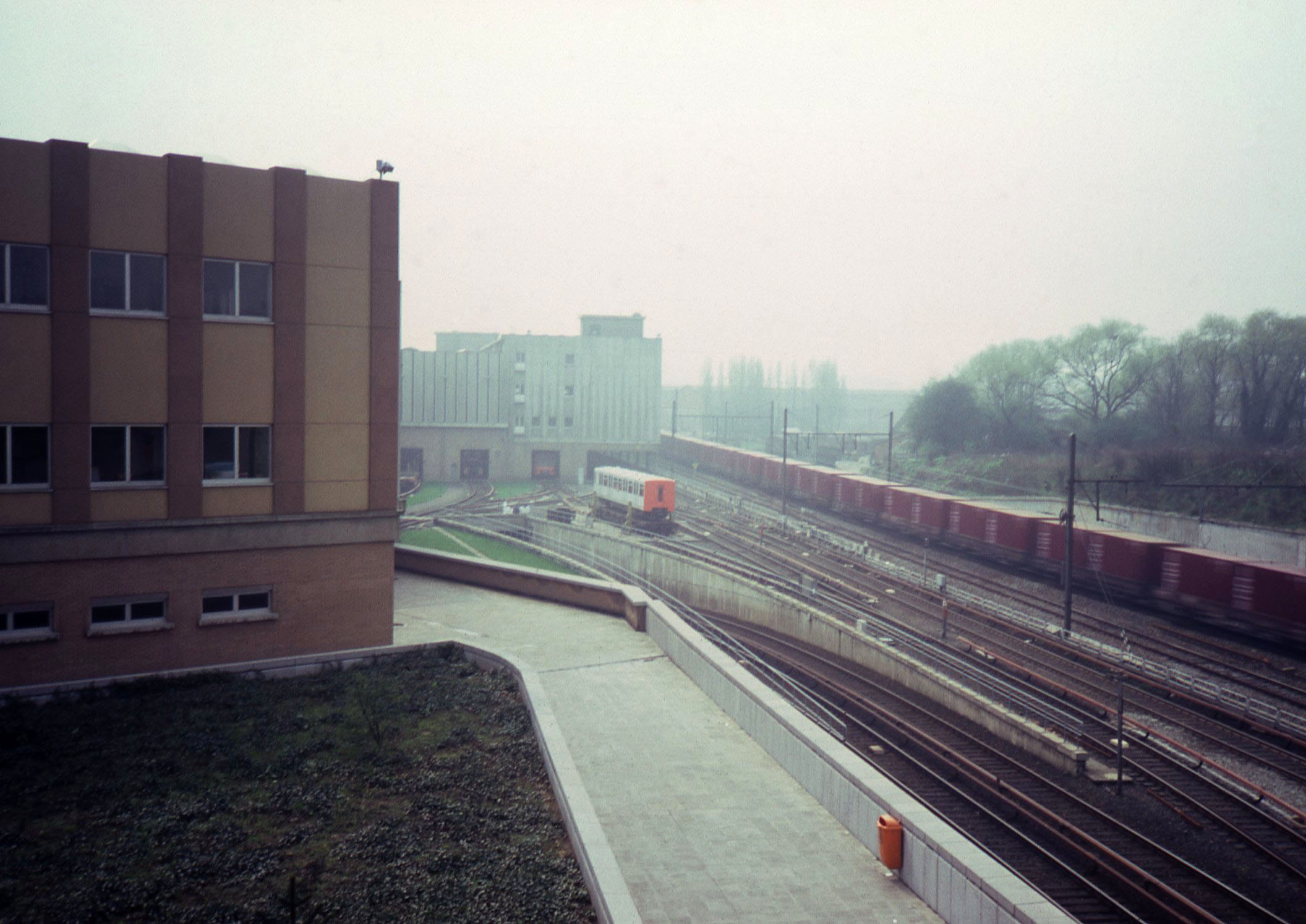
Delta depot, April 1981

During the construction of the Brussels Metro in the early 1970s, the Brussels Intercommunal Transport Company (STIB/MIVB) had to consider the additional infrastructure necessary to support the system's operation and future expansion. Alongside Delta metro station itself, work began on an adjoining 21,600 m^{2} (233,000 sq ft) depot and rail yard, lasting from 1972 to 1975. The new facility also contained garages and repair halls for the city's expanding public bus system.

== See also ==
- List of railway stations in Belgium
- Rail transport in Belgium
- Transport in Brussels
- History of Brussels
