= Germoir railway station =

Railway station in Brussels, Belgium

Germoir Mouterij
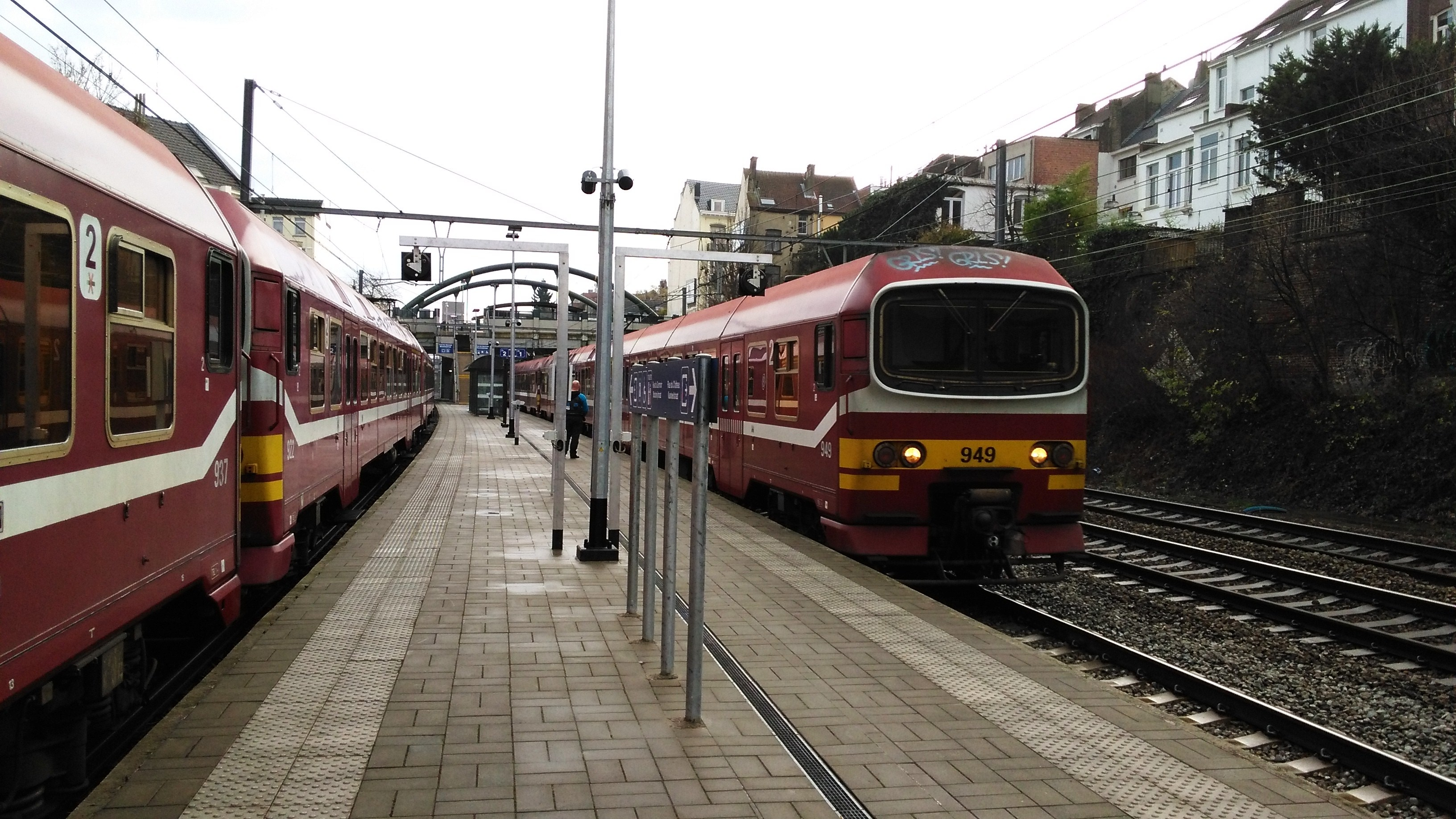
- Germoir/Mouterij railway station

General information
- Location: Ixelles, Brussels-Capital Region; Belgium
- Coordinates: 50°49′50″N 4°22′44″E
- System: Railway Station
- Owner: SNCB/NMBS
- Operator: SNCB/NMBS
- Line: 161
- Platforms: 2
- Tracks: 4

History
- Opened: 14 December 2015; 10 years ago
Location
- Location within Belgium Location within Europe

Germoir railway station (French: Gare de Germoir [ɡaʁ də ʒɛʁmwaʁ]) or Mouterij railway station (Dutch: Station Mouterij [staːˈɕɔn ˈmʌutəˌrɛi]) (Note: Officially Germoir/Mouterij (French: Germoir; Dutch: Mouterij)) is a railway station in the municipality of Ixelles in Brussels, Belgium. The station opened on 14 December 2015 on line 161. The train services are operated by the National Railway Company of Belgium (NMBS/SNCB). The station takes its name from the nearby street Rue du Germoir/Mouterijstraat (lit. 'Malt House Street').

The station was built as part of the Brussels Regional Express Network (RER/GEN) and was originally planned to open in 2012.

== Train services ==
The station is served by the following services:

- Brussels RER services (S5) Enghien - Halle - Etterbeek - Mechelen (weekdays)
- Brussels RER services (S9) Leuven - Brussels-Schuman - Braine-l'Alleud (weekdays)
- Brussels RER services (S5) Halle - Etterbeek - Mechelen (weekends)

Preceding station	NMBS/SNCB	Following station
Brussels-Luxembourg towards Mechelen	S 5	Etterbeek towards Enghien
Brussels-Luxembourg towards Leuven	S 9	Etterbeek towards Braine-l'Alleud

== Tram services ==
- 81 Marius Renard - Saint-Guidon/Sint-Guido - Midi/Zuid Station - Horta - Flagey - Germoir/Mouterij - Merode - Montgomery

== See also ==
- List of railway stations in Belgium
- Rail transport in Belgium
- Transport in Brussels
- History of Brussels
