= Brussels Airport-Zaventem railway station =

Railway station in Flemish Brabant, Belgium

Brussels Airport - Zaventem
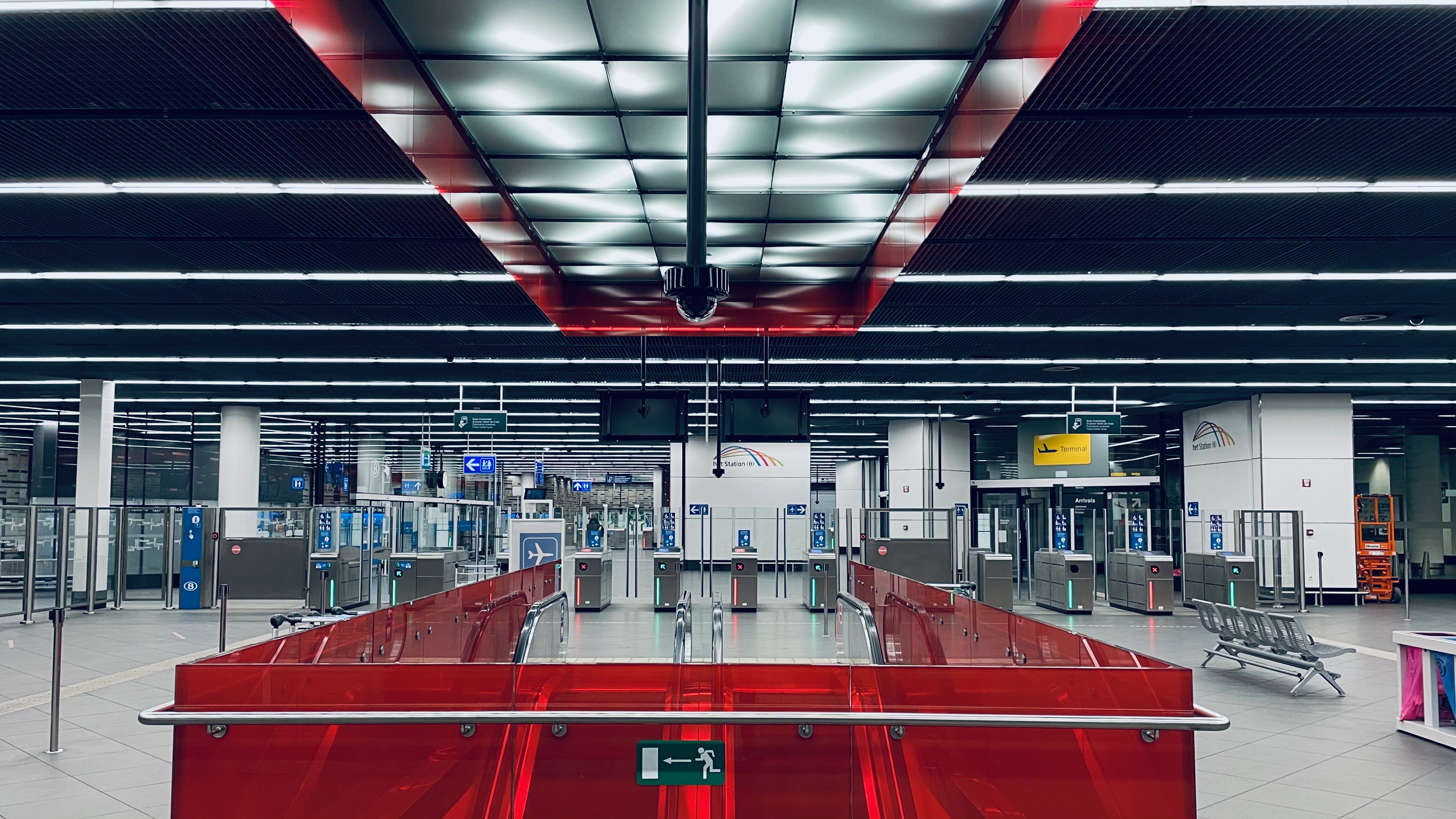
- Concourse level

General information
- Location: Brussels Airport (Level -1), Zaventem, Flemish Brabant; Belgium
- Coordinates: 50°53′50″N 4°29′05″E
- System: Railway Station
- Owner: NMBS/SNCB
- Operator: NMBS/SNCB
- Lines: 25N, 36C
- Platforms: 3
- Tracks: 5

Construction
- Structure type: Underground
- Cycle facilities: No
- Accessible: Yes

Other information
- Station code: BNAT, FBNL
- IATA code: BRU

History
- Opened: 1958; 68 years ago
- Rebuilt: 1998, 2012

Services
Preceding station	DB Fernverkehr	Following station
Antwerpen-Centraal Terminus	ICE 79	Leuven towards Köln Hbf
Location

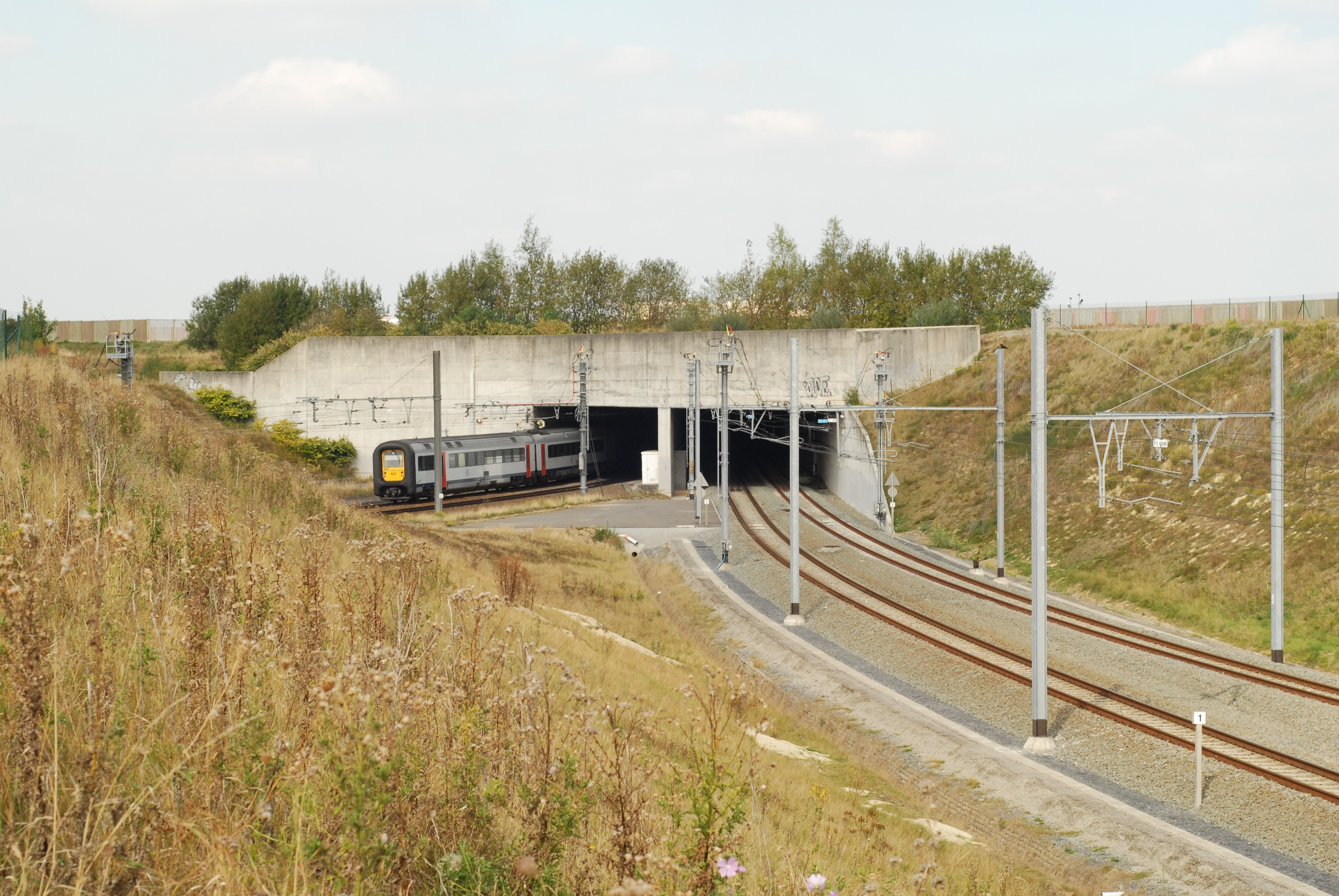
Tunnel to the railway station (south of airport)

Brussels Airport-Zaventem railway station (Dutch: Station Brussels Airport-Zaventem; French: Gare de Brussels Airport-Zaventem) (Note: Officially using the English name Brussels Airport-Zaventem in Dutch and French) is a railway station located beneath Brussels Airport in Zaventem, Flemish Brabant, Belgium. The station opened in 1958 on railway line 36C; in 2012, this was replaced with the Diabolo project linking line 36 with line 25N added. It was formerly called Brussels-National-Airport railway station (Dutch: Station Brussel-Nationaal-Luchthaven; French: Gare de Bruxelles-National-Aéroport) (Note: Officially Brussels-National-Airport (Dutch: Brussel-Nationaal-Luchthaven; French: Bruxelles-National-Aéroport)) until April 2016. The train services are operated by the National Railway Company of Belgium (NMBS/SNCB).

== History ==
=== Early history ===
A first open-air station was opened in 1955, creating a rail link between Brussels-Central railway station and Melsbroek Air Base. A second, underground station was opened in 1958 in the old airport building, to improve service to Brussels, which was hosting the 1958 Brussels World's Fair (Expo 58) that year.

=== Development ===
With the opening of a new airport terminal in 1994, the railway station was moved in 1998 to a new location inside the new building. Following the completion of the new Diabolo project, the station was extended in June 2012 to enhance the comfort and passenger experience. The trains arrive and leave from level -2, with ticket desks on level -1. Passengers can go to the different floors in the airport and railway station by using a set of escalators and lifts, a couple of metres away from the platforms.

=== 2016 Brussels bombings ===
After the bomb attacks of 22 March 2016, the station was closed and all trains were either deviated or cancelled until further notice. Shuttle bus services were put in place between Zaventem railway station and the airport. The airport station itself was undamaged, but it is connected to a part of the airport building that was severely damaged during the attacks.

With the Schuman-Josaphat tunnel entering into service on 4 April 2016, a new connection was established to connect Brussels Airport directly to the stations of the European Quarter (Brussels-Schuman and Brussels-Luxembourg). This brought the travel time between the airport and the European Quarter to about 15 minutes. The tunnel was originally scheduled to open on 12 December 2015, but it was delayed due to the Brussels lockdown. When it eventually opened in April 2016, it could not yet be used to its full potential as the airport station remained closed following the Brussels bombings.

Train service to the airport station resumed on 22 April 2016, temporarily using the entrance/exit of the old airport station. On 8 June 2016, service via the regular station resumed.

== Features ==
The railway station connects the airport directly to Brussels' main Brussels, including the international Brussels-South and centrally located Brussels-Central stations. The railway stations of Leuven and Mechelen can also be directly reached from the airport. From all these stations, one can easily travel to every city of Belgium; there are direct trains to Antwerp, Bruges, Ghent, Halle or Mons.

Since December 2014, the Benelux train allows passengers to travel directly to Rotterdam, Amsterdam Airport Schiphol and Amsterdam.

There is no dedicated car park but Brussels Airport car parks are available a short walk away, without any discount for rail customers.

== Train services ==
The station has direct train services to most major Belgian cities, as well as a regular service to Rottterdam in the Netherlands.

The station is served by the following services:

- Intercity services (IC 35) Rotterdam - Breda - Antwerp - Brussels Airport - Brussels
- Intercity services (IC 06) Tournai - Ath - Brussels - Brussels Airport
- Intercity services (IC 06A) Mons - Brussels - Brussels Airport
- Intercity services (IC 08) Antwerpen - Mechelen - Brussels Airport - Leuven (- Hasselt)
- Intercity services (IC 17) Brussels Airport - Brussels-Luxembourg - Namur - Dinant
- Intercity services (IC 23) Ostend - Bruges - Kortrijk - Zottegem - Brussels - Brussels Airport - Brussels - Ghent (- Bruges)
- Intercity services (IC 23A) Bruges - Ghent - Brussels - Brussels Airport (weekdays)
- Intercity services (IC 23A) Ghent - Brussels - Brussels Airport (weekends)
- Intercity services (IC 27) Brussels Airport - Brussels-Luxembourg - Nivelles - Charleroi
- Intercity services (IC 29) De Panne - Ghent - Aalst - Brussels - Brussels Airport - Leuven (- Landen)

Preceding station	NS International	Following station
Mechelen towards Rotterdam Centraal	Eurocity 9200	Brussels-North towards Brussels-South
Preceding station	NMBS/SNCB	Following station
Terminus	IC 06	Zaventem towards Tournai
Terminus	IC 06A	Bruxelles-Nord / Brussel-Noord towards Mons
Mechelen towards Antwerpen-Centraal	IC 08	Leuven towards Hasselt
Terminus	IC 17 weekdays	Bordet towards Dinant
Terminus	IC 23	Bruxelles-Nord / Brussel-Noord towards Oostende
Terminus	IC 23A	Bruxelles-Nord / Brussel-Noord towards Brugge
Terminus	IC 27 weekdays	Bordet towards Charleroi-Sud
Bruxelles-Nord / Brussel-Noord towards De Panne	IC 29	Leuven towards Landen

The station was served by the following services:

- High speed service: (Thalys) Brussels Airport - Brussels - Paris (from 2011 to 2015, last year only summer seasonal)

== See also ==
- List of railway stations in Belgium
- Rail transport in Belgium
- Transport in Brussels
- History of Brussels
