= Josaphat Brownfield =

Former rail marshalling yard in Brussels, Belgium

Josaphat Brownfield Friche Josaphat (French) Josaphatfriche (Dutch)

General information
- Other names: Site Josaphat (French); Josaphatsite (Dutch)
- Location: Avenue Gustave Latinis 150-152; B-1030; Schaerbeek, Brussels; Belgium
- Coordinates: 50°51′44″N 4°23′45″E
- Owner: sau-msi.brussels
- Line: Belgian railway line 26
- Tracks: 6

Other information
- Website: www.sauvonslafrichejosaphat.be

History
- Opened: 1926
- Closed: 1994
Location

The Josaphat Brownfield (formerly the Schaerbeek Josaphat marshalling yard) is a 25 ha (62-acre) piece of land located between Schaerbeek and Evere in Brussels. Once a marshalling yard between the Meiser railway station and the Evere railway station linking Schaerbeek and Halle, the brownfield has since developed into a biodiversity haven in the heart of the European Union's capital.

== History ==
The station was inaugurated on July 19, 1926, as the Terdelt garden city neighbourhood was being developed. The freight station was operated until 1994 and used six tracks.

First owned by the SNCB, then Infrabel, the decommissioned area was bought by the Regional Administration of Brussels on December 30, 2005, through its Urban Development Corporation (SAU-MSI). It has since been subject to various urban projects. The most recent plan was to create a mixed-use neighbourhood including 1380 housing units (45% publicly owned, 55% privately owned) and parking spaces, a three-star hotel with 126 rooms, 9,600 m^{2} (103,000 sq ft) of office space, 2,850 m^{2} (30,700 sq ft) dedicated to local businesses and an area of 8.34 ha (20.6 acres) for urban industry.

In 2013, the land was backfilled and cleaned up. It naturally rewilded due to the absence of human activity and became a prosperous area for biodiversity. Several nonprofits dedicated to nature conservation such as Natagora and Natuurpunt have since highlighted the brownfield's ecological importance.

== Biodiversity ==
As of December 2020, 1,175 species were identified on the nature observation platform observations.be, with 526 in 2020 alone. The wealth in biodiversity can be attributed to both the absence of human activity and Brussels being located below several important bird migration routes.

Among the observed species:

- 114 birds
- 190 Hymenoptera, of which:
  - 120 wild bees
- 112 moths
- 33 butterflies
- 32 Odonatas (both dragonflies and damselflies)
- 88 beetles
- 14 Orthoptera (Caelifera and grasshoppers)

Some species are extremely rare, such as the Anthidium septemspinosum which had not been recorded in Belgium before.

== Controversy ==
Since 2018, the Brussels-Capital Region has developed an urbanistic tool allowing it to derogate from all previous relevant legislation like land use and maximal legal building height. Named Plan d'Aménagement Directeur (PAD), these master plans allow for rapid execution and ignore the basics of citizen participation. They were based on a projected demographic boom justifying the construction of thousands of housing units throughout the region. However, recent statistics have shown the population growth to be of roughly 2,000 people per year, compared to the 10,000 initially communicated.

The Josaphat Brownfield is one of ten strategic locations the Brussels-Capital Region deemed fit for a PAD. Though the land is currently owned by a limited liability company under public law, in the Urban Development Corporation of the Brussels-Capital Region, they plan to sell it to a private developer. The project currently states only 45% of the housing units will be publicly owned. Numerous citizens, nonprofits and pressure groups have raised awareness as the development is in the heart of a city where over 40,000 households are waiting to be allocated public housing.

Parallelly, critics have been imploring the government to stop the excessive construction on land that provides increasingly rare ecosystem services in the centre of Brussels. The warming climate has stressed the importance of green space in cities suffering from the urban heat island effect due to an ocean of concrete. The Josaphat Brownfield provides an exceptional breath of fresh air in such a congested and polluted city. Ecologists have also insisted that the area be preserved given the risk of a sixth mass extinction.

== Citizen mobilisation ==
For the past couple of years, citizens have joined forces to raise awareness on the risks the area faces in terms of rapid urbanisation and biodiversity loss. A petition with over 9,500 signatories and a Facebook group counting 4,500 active members have put the subject in the news.

== See also ==
- Belgian railway line 26
- History of rail transport in Belgium
