= Haren, Belgium =

Neighbourhood in Brussels, Belgium

Haren
- Neighbourhood
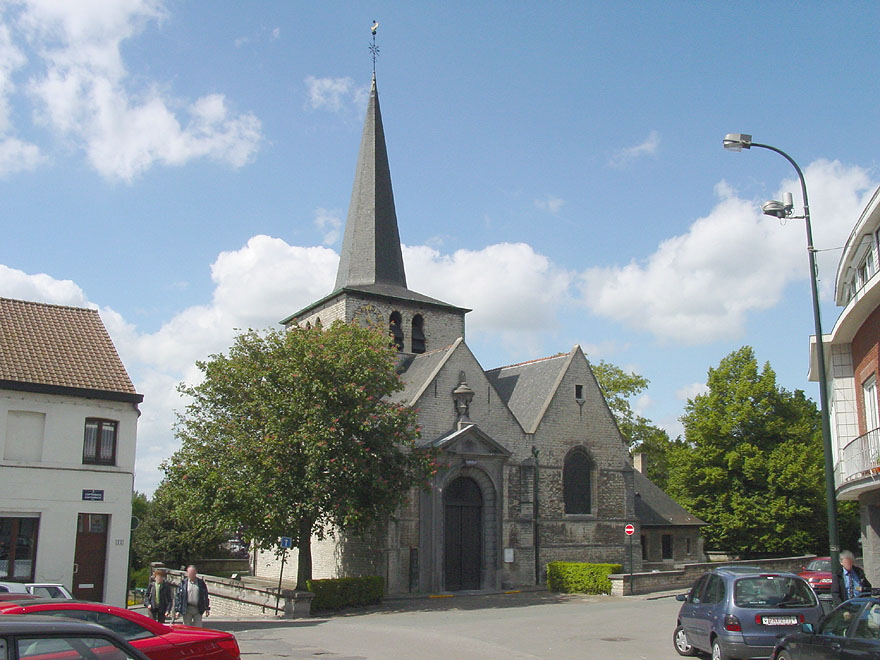
- Church of St. Elizabeth in the centre of Haren

- Location within Brussels Haren (Belgium)
- Coordinates: 50°53′31″N 4°25′6″E
- Country: Belgium
- Region: Brussels-Capital Region
- Arrondissement: Brussels-Capital
- Municipality: City of Brussels

Area
  - Total: 5.83 km^{2} (2.25 sq mi)

Population (2012)
  - Total: 4,635
- Time zone: UTC+1 (CET)
  - Summer (DST): UTC+2 (CEST)
- Postal code: 1130
- Area codes: 02

Haren (French: [aʁœn]; Dutch: [ˈɦaːrə(n)]; sometimes written Haeren in French) is a former municipality of Brussels, Belgium, that was merged into the City of Brussels in 1921. It is an outlying part of the municipality and is situated at the north-eastern edge of the Brussels-Capital Region, bordering Machelen outside the boundary. Haren's postal code is 1130.

In contrast to most of Brussels, Haren has retained nearly as many Dutch speakers as French speakers and has preserved a somewhat rural appearance.

== History ==
The first mention of Haren dates from a little after 1050 in a book on the miracles of Saint Trudo and designates a villa. A second mention dated more precisely to 1138, relates to the foundation and endowment of the chapter of St. Gudula (future cathedral of Brussels), the most important ecclesiastical owner in Haren. The lords of Haren were involved in the management of the City of Brussels in the 17th century.

Brussels' first airport was located in Haren between 1914 and the early 1950s. The site, which was later used by the Belgian Air Force, serves since 2018 as NATO's new headquarters, previously located south of the Boulevard Léopold III/Leopold III-laan. The current site of Brussels Airport is located several kilometres to the east.

Between 1932 and 1997, Haren was also the location of a Renault automobile factory, which in 1969, for the first time, produced more than 100,000 cars in a single year. At that time, it was concentrating on the assembly of Renault 4 and Renault 6 models, mostly for sale in Benelux, Germany and Scandinavia. Renault also assembled AMC's Rambler automobiles there for sale in European markets.

== Main sites ==
- Haren is host to the headquarters of NATO, Eurocontrol, as well as those of many large international companies.
- Haren Prison opened in 2022; it is a prison village occupying a 15-hectare-size (37-acre) site, with a designed capacity of 1,190 persons. It was partly built on the site of the derelict Wanson factory, and partly on a nature reserve.
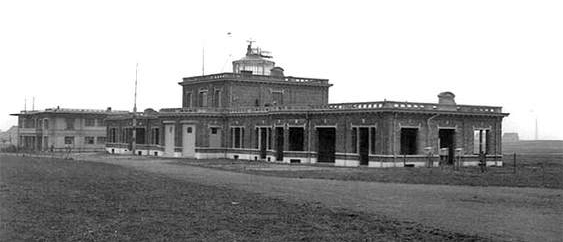
Haren Airport in 1929

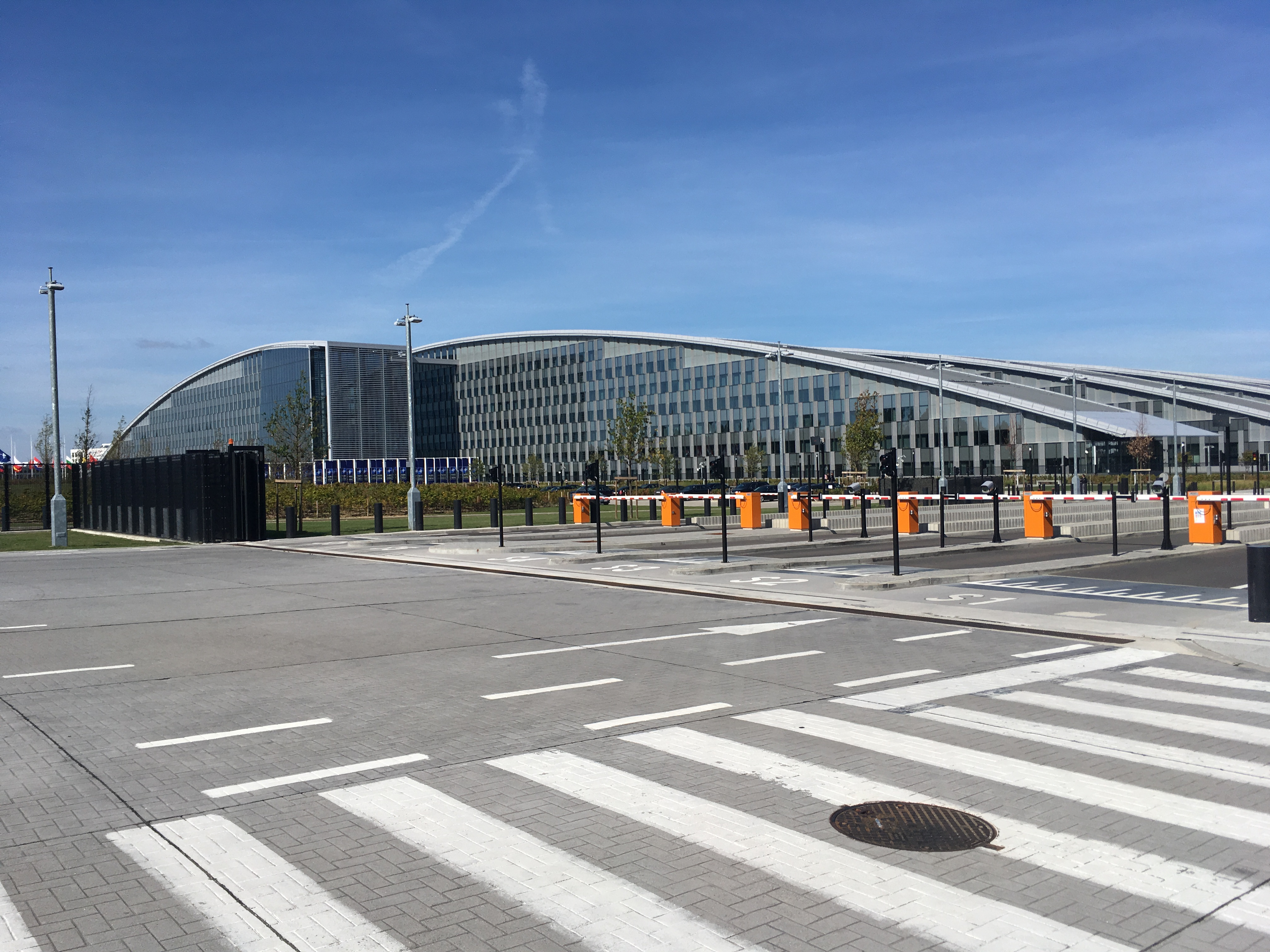
NATO headquarters

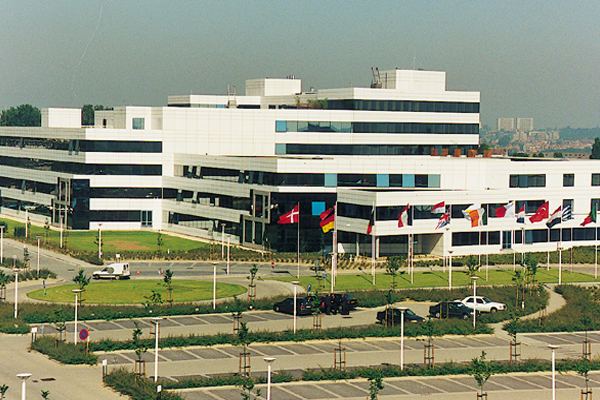
Eurocontrol headquarters

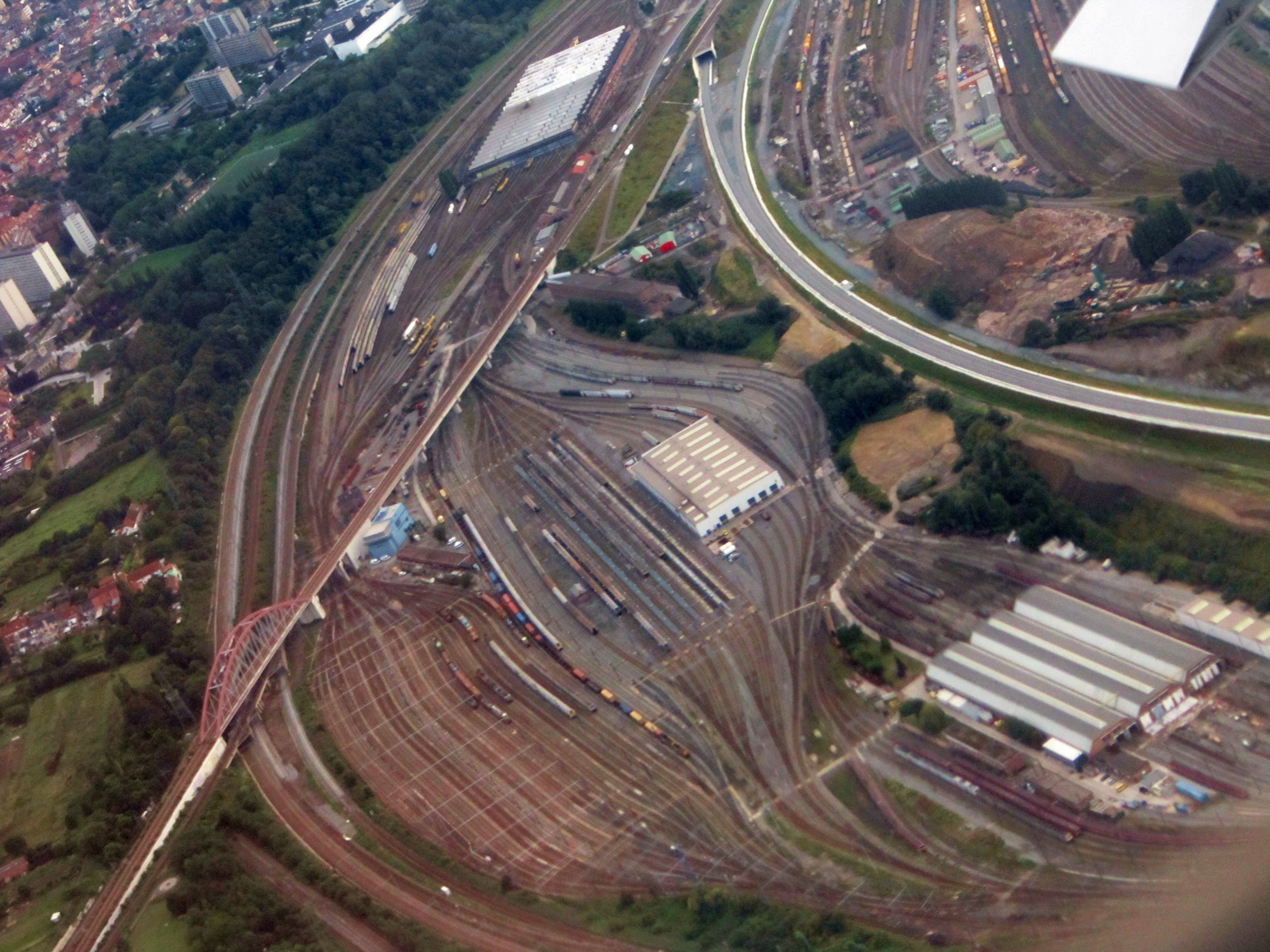
SNCB/NMBS marshalling yard

== Transport ==
Haren has three railway stations: Buda (formerly called Haren-Buda, situated just outside the Brussels boundary) on line 25 between Brussels and Antwerp, Haren (formerly called Haren-Linde) on line 26 between Halle and Vilvoorde, and Haren-South on line 36 between Brussels and Leuven. The marshalling yard of the National Railway Company of Belgium (SNCB/NMBS), sometimes referred to as Schaerbeek-Formation/Schaarbeek-Vorming, is largely located within the territory of Haren.

== Politics ==
=== Mayors ===
Historical list of mayors or burgomasters of Haren:

- 1840: Jean-Baptiste Vanderelst
- 1871: F. Van Pevenage
- 1874: A. A. Jacobs
- 1879: P. Vanderelst
- 1901: J.B. Van Holsbeeck
- 1905: L.M.A Maes

In 1921, Haren ceased to be a municipality, the mayor being from then on that of the City of Brussels.

== See also ==
- Neighbourhoods in Brussels
- History of Brussels
- Belgium in the long nineteenth century
