= Moensberg railway station =

Railway station in Brussels, Belgium

Moensberg
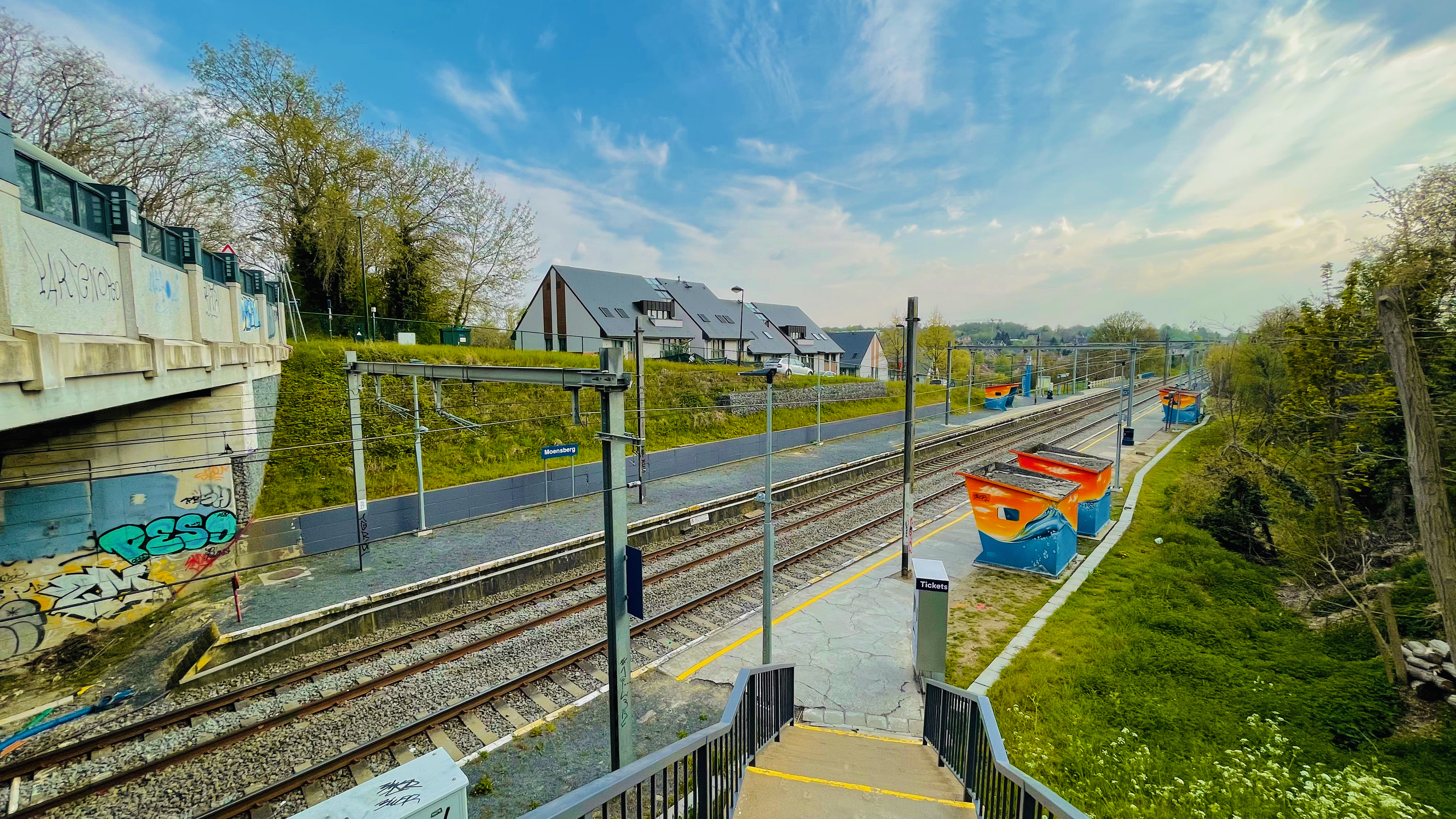
- Moensberg railway station

General information
- Location: Uccle, Brussels-Capital Region; Belgium
- Coordinates: 50.7785°N 4.3312°E
- System: Railway Station
- Owner: SNCB/NMBS
- Operator: SNCB/NMBS
- Line: 26 (Schaarbeek-Halle)
- Platforms: 2
- Tracks: 2

Passengers
- 2014: 493 per day
Location
- Location within Belgium Location within Europe

Moensberg railway station (French: Gare de Moensberg; Dutch: Station Moensberg) (Note: Officially Moensberg) is a railway station in the municipality of Uccle in Brussels, Belgium. It is operated by the National Railway Company of Belgium (NMBS/SNCB). The station is on line 26, between Saint-Job and Beersel railway stations.

== Train services ==
The station is served by the following service(s):

- Brussels RER services (S5) Mechelen - Brussels-Luxembourg - Etterbeek - Halle - Enghien (- Geraardsbergen) (weekdays)
- Brussels RER services (S7) Mechelen - Merode - Halle (weekdays)
- Brussels RER services (S9) Leuven - Brussels-Luxembourg - Etterbeek - Braine-l'Alleud (weekdays, peak hours only)

Preceding station	NMBS/SNCB	Following station
Saint-Job towards Mechelen	S 5 weekdays	Beersel towards Enghien
Saint-Job towards Vilvoorde	S 7 weekdays	Beersel towards Halle

== See also ==
- List of railway stations in Belgium
- Rail transport in Belgium
- Transport in Brussels
- History of Brussels
