= Tilleul metro station =

Planned metro station in Brussels, Belgium

Tilleul (French) or Linde (Dutch) is a planned Brussels Metro station on line 3, between Riga and Paix/Vrede.

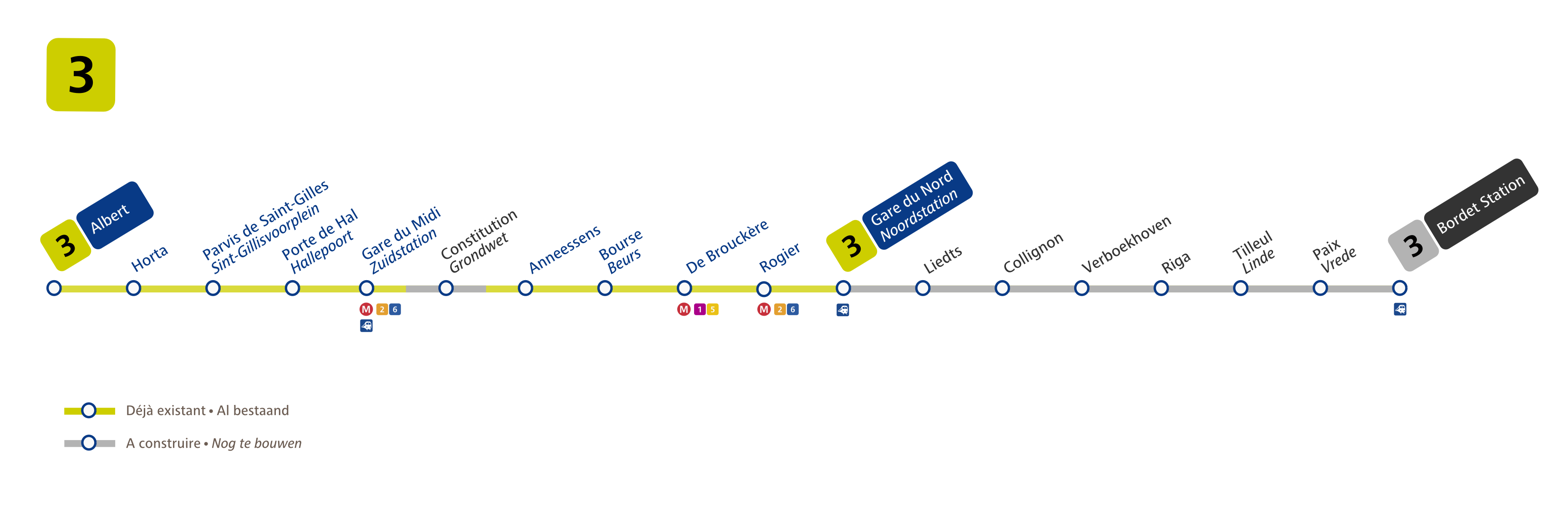

The new northern section of line 3, which includes the station, is the most difficult part of the construction project. Completion could take ten years. In June 2023, Beliris asked for help from the Belgian Government, following a series of delays and cost overruns. As of December 2022, construction of the new line was expected to be complete in 2032.
