= Schuman-Josaphat tunnel =

Rail tunnel in Brussels, Belgium

Coordinates: 50°50′40″N 4°23′30″E

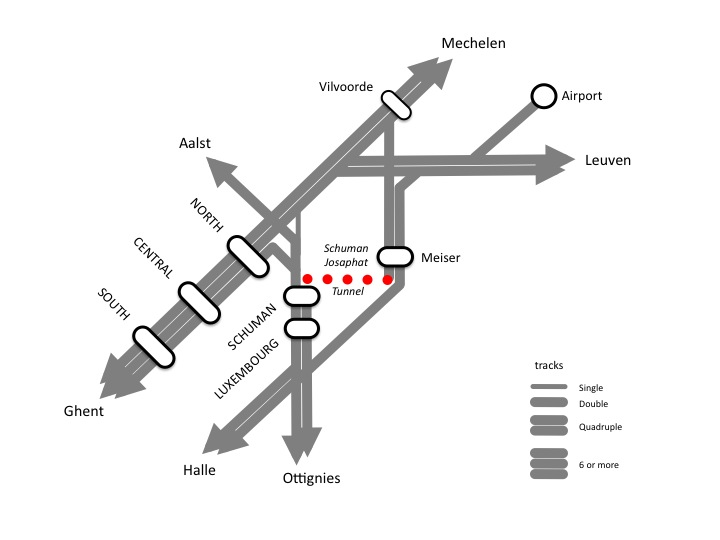
How the tunnel fits into the Brussels rail network

The Schuman-Josaphat tunnel (French: Tunnel Schuman-Josaphat; Dutch: Schuman-Josafattunnel) is a 1,250-metre-long (4,100 ft) double track rail tunnel in Brussels, Belgium, which entered into service on 4 April 2016. It links line 161 (Brussels-Namur) just after Meiser station and line 26 (Halle-Vilvoorde) at the Cinquantenaire/Jubelpark tunnel just before Schuman station. The line is numbered L161A.

A key component of the Brussels Regional Express Network (RER/GEN) project, the tunnel passes beneath the Avenue Plasky/Plaskylaan, the Place de Jamblinne de Meux/Jamblinne de Meuxplein and the Cortenbergh/Kortenberg road tunnel. The position of the tunnel in the Brussels rail network is shown in the simplified map on the right.

Benefits of the project include reducing the journey time from the European Quarter (Brussels-Schuman and Brussels-Luxembourg railway stations) to the airport from half an hour to less than 15 minutes by opening a direct route and avoid having to change at Brussels-North railway station, as well as opening a parallel route through Brussels to take pressure off the saturated North–South connection

== Project details ==
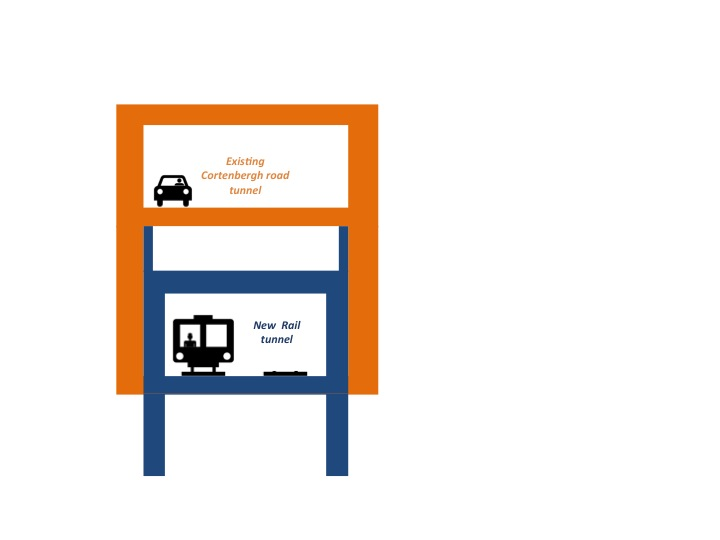
Rail tunnel structure (in blue) as it fits in/under the road tunnel foundations (in orange)

The project began in June 2008 and was planned to take 1,645 days to complete. Construction is taking place in two phases. Firstly, the shell was dug out, which finished in late 2011. Secondly, equipping the tunnel with tracks, etc. was scheduled to last from late 2010 to late 2013. In fact, track laying began in 2014.

The tunnel was expected to be officially opened on 12 December 2015, but the opening was postponed until 9 April 2016 because the mandatory safety test could not be held due to the Brussels lockdown. The opening date was designed in the framework of the Brussels RER 2015 plan, which had to be modified until the tunnel could be put into service. The safety test was eventually held on 25 February 2016, and the tunnel opened on 4 April.

The cost of the tunnel is estimated at €210 million, funded through Beliris, a joint venture between the Belgian Federal State and the Brussels Region. The project is also managed by Infrabel.

Unusual construction techniques were used to limit disturbance to local residents and protect the appearance of Brussels. It was decided to carry out the work without opening the tunnel from the surface so the digging is being done without a tunnel boring machine, but rather by hand or using small excavators. The Cortenbergh road tunnel was built with extra deep foundations to accommodate a future rail tunnel beneath it. Elsewhere, the tunnel passes close beneath the cellars of buildings, and in any case delivering a TBM in central Brussels would have created great disruption. Similar techniques were used during the construction of the underground junction passing under Antwerpen-Centraal railway station.

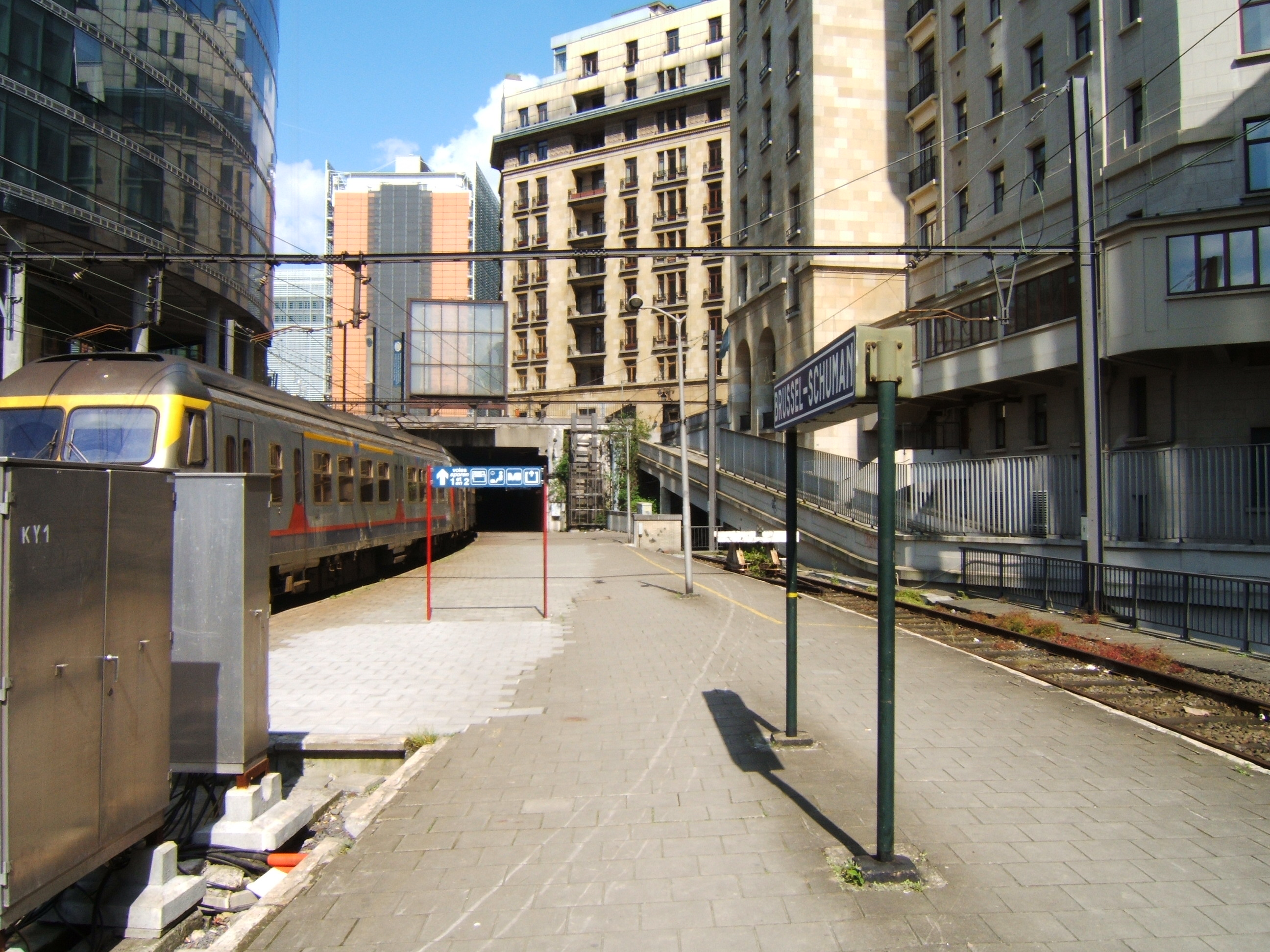
Brussels-Schuman railway station looking north towards the Schuman-Josaphat tunnel

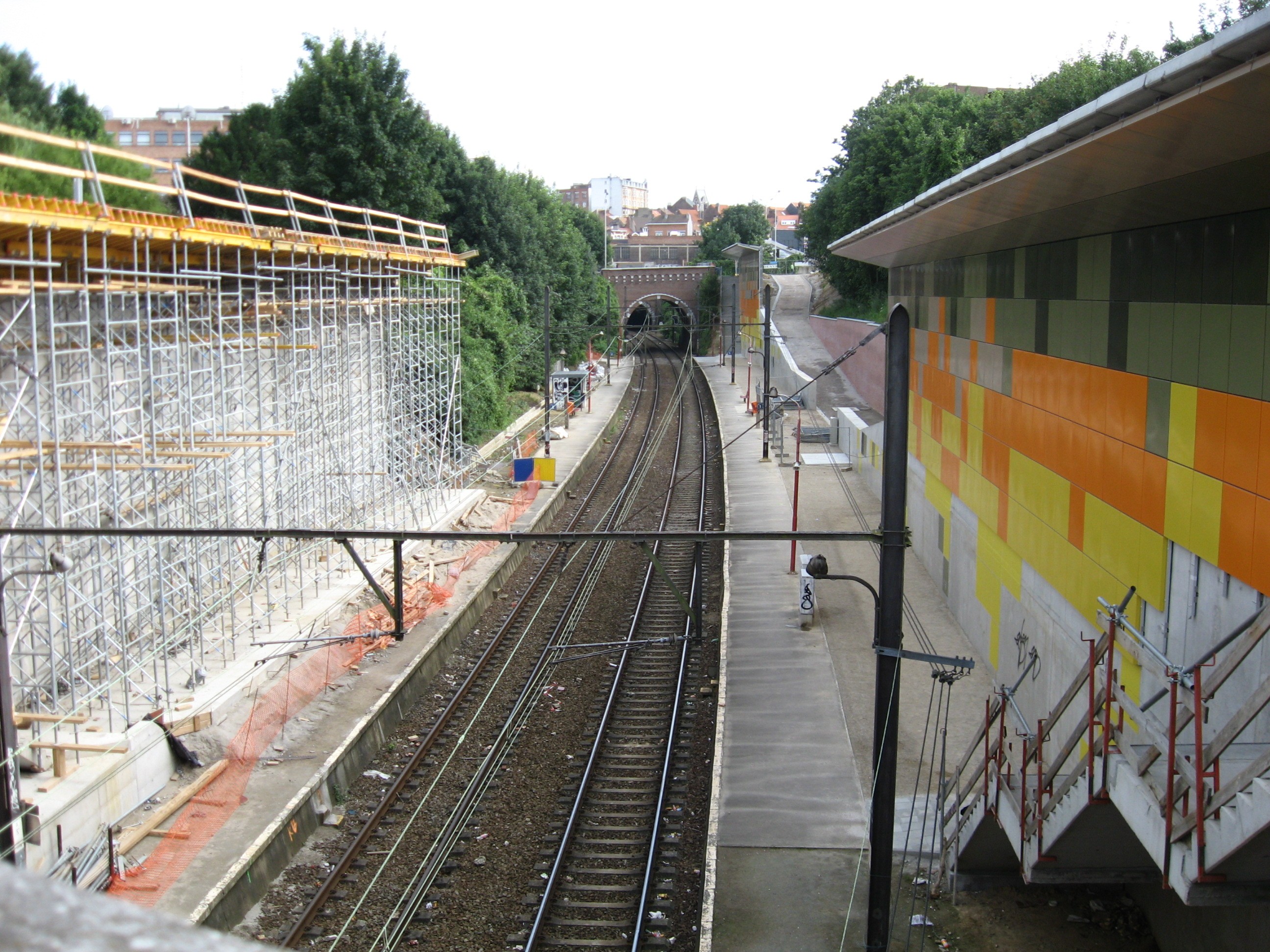
Meiser railway station looking south towards the Schuman-Josaphat tunnel
