= Haren railway station (Brussels) =

Railway station in Brussels, Belgium

Haren
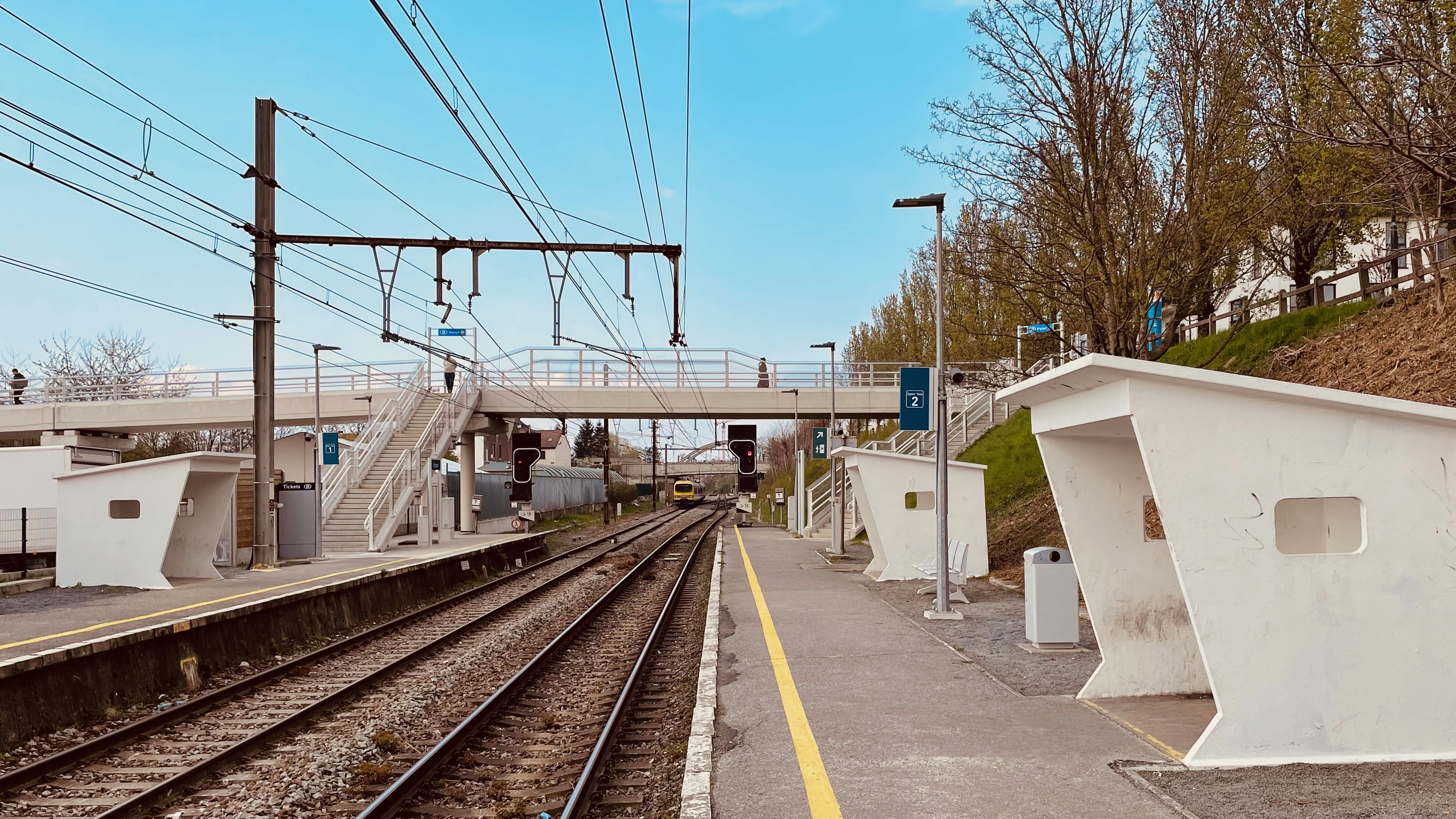
- Haren railway station

General information
- Location: Middelweg; 1130 Haren, City of Brussels, Brussels-Capital Region; Belgium
- Coordinates: 50°53′19″N 4°25′11″E
- System: Railway Station
- Owner: SNCB/NMBS
- Operator: SNCB/NMBS
- Tracks: 2

Services
Preceding station	NMBS/SNCB	Following station
Vilvoorde towards Mechelen	S 5	Bordet towards Enghien
Vilvoorde Terminus	S 7	Bordet towards Halle
Location
- Location within Belgium Location within Europe

Haren railway station (French: Gare de Haren; Dutch: Station Haren) (Note: Officially Haren) is a railway station on line 26 of the Belgian railway network. It is situated in Haren, part of the City of Brussels in the Brussels-Capital Region, Belgium. The train services are operated by the National Railway Company of Belgium (NMBS/SNCB).

Haren-South railway station, on line 36, is a short distance away - despite its name, it is actually sited to the north-west of Haren station.

== Train services ==
The station is served by the following services:

- Brussels RER services (S5) Mechelen - Brussels-Luxembourg - Etterbeek - Halle - Enghien (- Geraardsbergen) (weekdays)
- Brussels RER services (S5) Mechelen - Brussels-Luxembourg - Etterbeek - Halle (weekends)
- Brussels RER services (S7) Vilvoorde - Merode - Halle (weekdays)

== See also ==
- List of railway stations in Belgium
- Rail transport in Belgium
- Transport in Brussels
- History of Brussels
