= Evere railway station =

Railway station in Brussels, Belgium

Evere
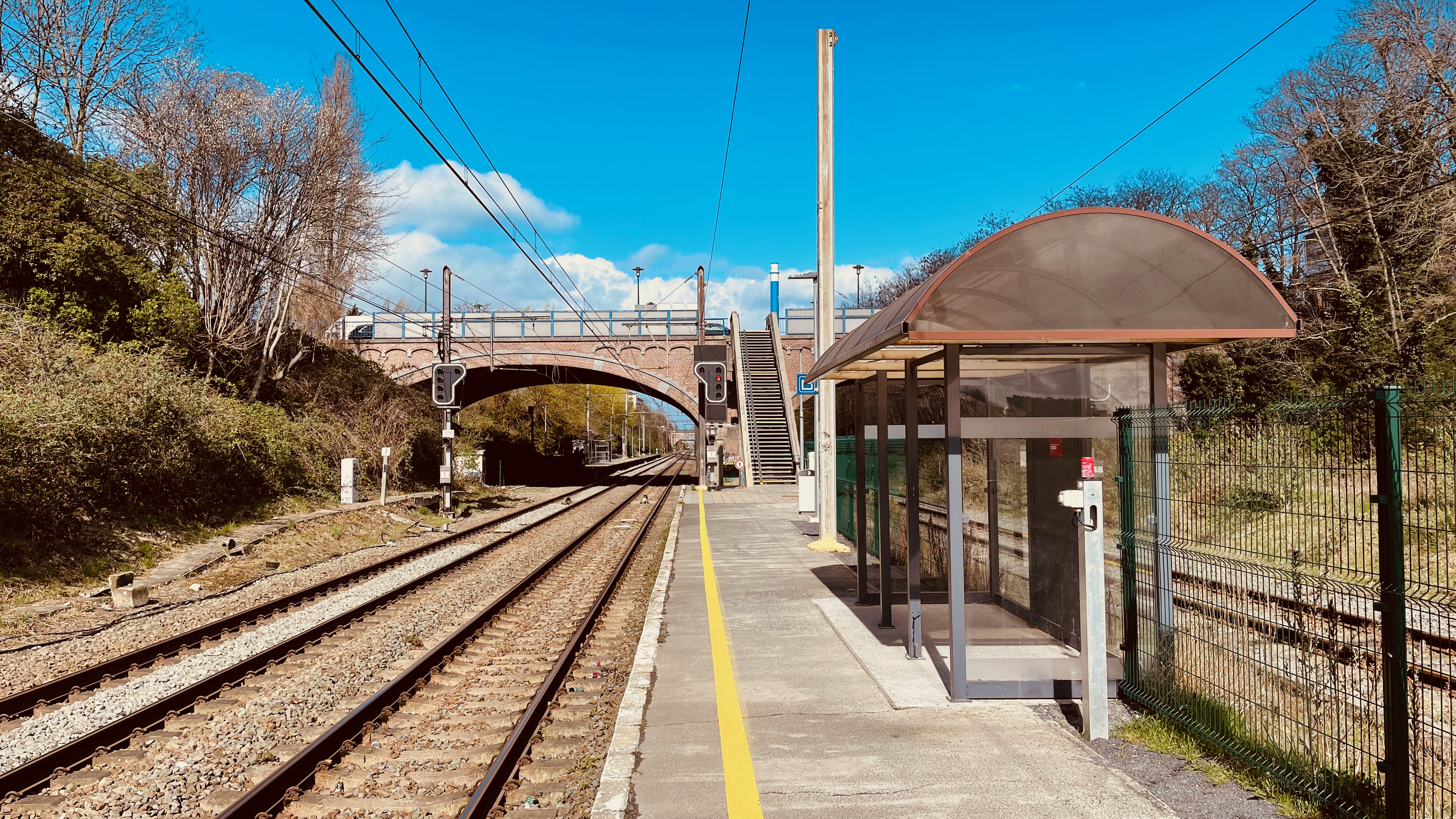
- Evere railway station

General information
- Location: Evere, Brussels-Capital Region; Belgium
- Coordinates: 50°52′01″N 4°24′01″E
- System: Railway Station
- Owner: SNCB/NMBS
- Operator: SNCB/NMBS
- Line: 26
- Platforms: 2
- Tracks: 3

Other information
- Station code: (H)

History
- Opened: 19 July 1926; 100 years ago

Passengers
- 2014: 341 per day
Location
- Location within Belgium Location within Europe

Evere railway station (French: Gare d'Evere; Dutch: Station Evere) (Note: Officially Evere) is a railway station in the municipality of Evere in Brussels, Belgium. The station opened on 19 July 1926, is located under street level, and can be accessed via the Rue Auguste De Boeck/Auguste De Boeckstraat. The station lies on line 26, between Bordet and Meiser railway stations. The train services are operated by the National Railway Company of Belgium (NMBS/SNCB).

== Train services ==
The station is served by the following service(s):

- Brussels RER services (S4) Vilvoorde - Merode - Etterbeek - Brussels-Luxembourg - Denderleeuw - Aalst (weekdays, peak hours only)
- Brussels RER services (S5) Mechelen - Brussels-Luxembourg - Etterbeek - Halle - Enghien (- Geraardsbergen) (weekdays)
- Brussels RER services (S7) Mechelen - Merode - Halle (weekdays)
- Brussels RER services (S9) Leuven - Brussels-Luxembourg - Etterbeek - Braine-l'Alleud (weekdays, peak hours only)

Preceding station	NMBS/SNCB	Following station
Bordet towards Mechelen	S 4 weekdays	Meiser towards Aalst
Bordet towards Mechelen	S 5 weekdays	Meiser towards Enghien
Bordet towards Vilvoorde	S 7 weekdays	Meiser towards Halle
Bordet towards Leuven	S 9 weekdays	Meiser towards Braine-l'Alleud

== See also ==
- List of railway stations in Belgium
- Rail transport in Belgium
- Transport in Brussels
- History of Brussels
