= Saint-Job railway station =

Railway station in Brussels, Belgium

Saint-Job Sint-Job
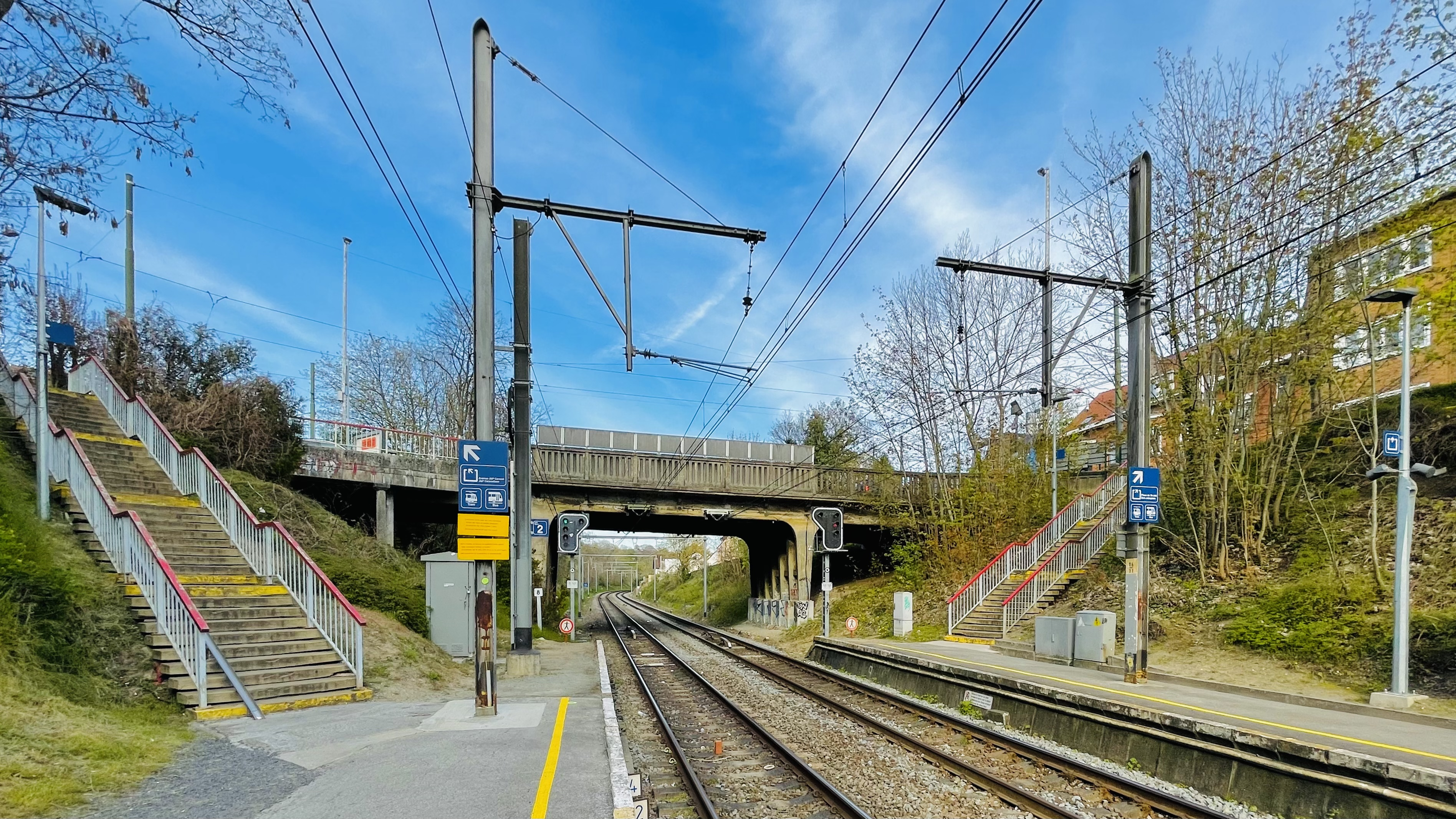
- Saint-Job/Sint-Job railway station

General information
- Location: Uccle, Brussels-Capital Region; Belgium
- Coordinates: 50.7941°N 4.3618°E
- System: Railway Station
- Owner: SNCB/NMBS
- Operator: SNCB/NMBS
- Line: 26 (Schaarbeek-Halle)
- Platforms: 2
- Tracks: 2

Passengers
- 2014: 898 per day
Location
- Location within Belgium Location within Europe

Saint-Job railway station (French: Gare de Saint-Job) or Sint-Job railway station (Dutch: Station Sint-Job) (Note: Officially Saint-Job/Sint-Job (French: Saint-Job; Dutch: Sint-Job)) is a railway station in the municipality of Uccle in Brussels, Belgium. The station, operated by the National Railway Company of Belgium (NMBS/SNCB), is located on line 26, between Boondael and Moensberg railway stations. The station is named after the nearby Place de Saint-Job/Sint-Jobsplein.

== Train services ==
The station is served by the following service(s):

- Intercity services (IC-27) (Leuven) - Brussels Airport - Brussels-Luxembourg - St Job - Braine L'alleud - (Nivelles - Charleroi)
- Brussels RER services (S5) Mechelen - Brussels-Luxembourg - Etterbeek- St Job - Halle - Enghien (- Geraardsbergen) (weekdays)
- Brussels RER services (S7) Mechelen - Merode - St Job - Halle (weekdays)
- Brussels RER services (S9) Leuven - Brussels-Luxembourg - Etterbeek- St Job - Braine-l'Alleud (weekdays, peak hours only)

Preceding station	NMBS/SNCB	Following station
Vivier d'Oie towards Brussels National Airport	IC 27	Linkebeek towards Charleroi-Sud
Vivier d'Oie towards Mechelen	S 5 weekdays	Moensberg towards Enghien
Vivier d'Oie towards Vilvoorde	S 7 weekdays	Moensberg towards Halle
Vivier d'Oie towards Leuven	S 9 weekdays	Moensberg towards Braine-l'Alleud

== Connections ==
The station offers a connection with Brussels tram route 92, as well as bus routes 60 and 37. Buses of the Walloon transport company TEC also stop there.

== See also ==
- List of railway stations in Belgium
- Rail transport in Belgium
- Transport in Brussels
- History of Brussels
