= Bordet railway station =

Railway station in Brussels, Belgium

Coordinates: 50.8774°N 4.4097°E

Bordet
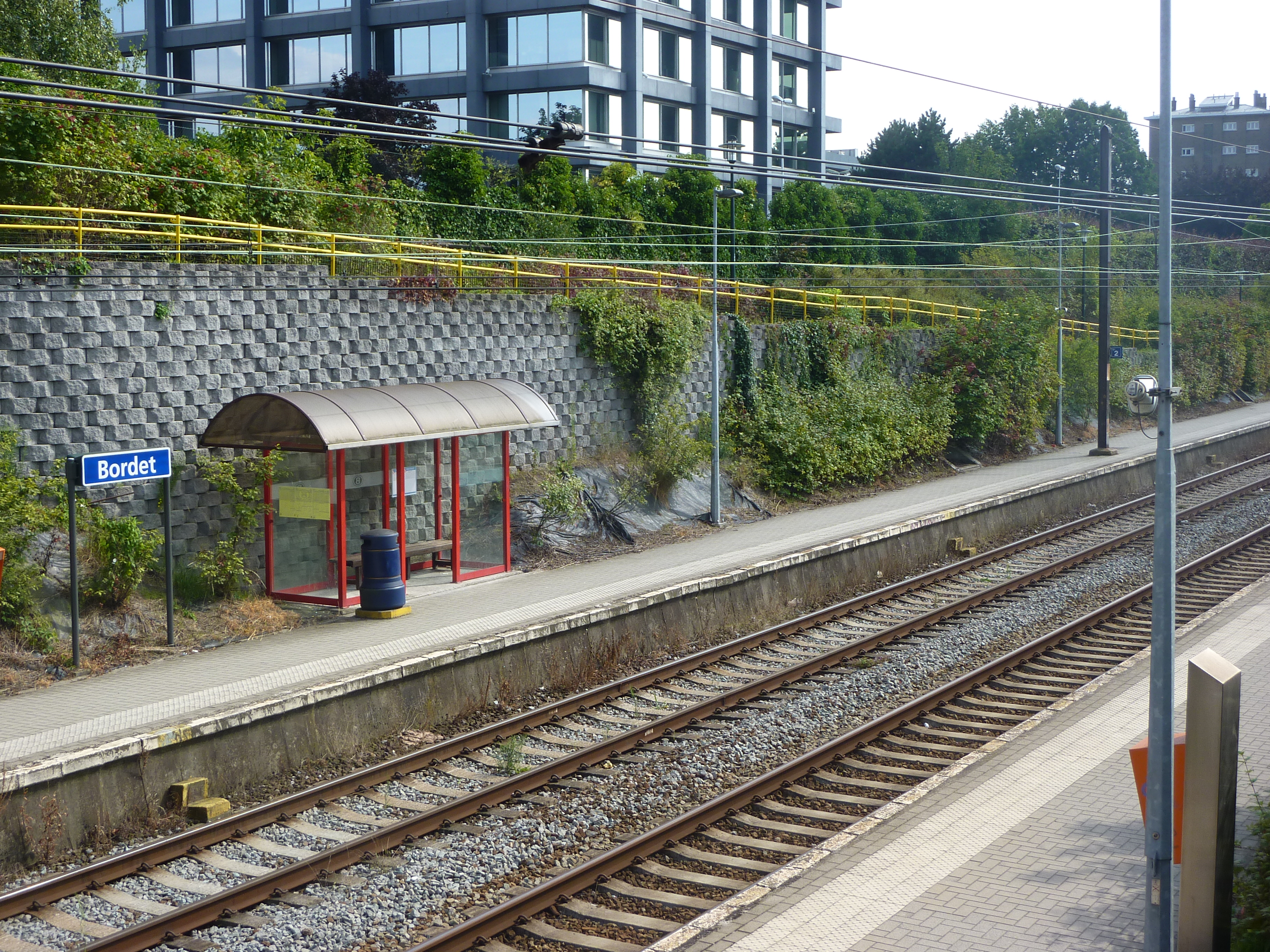
- Bordet railway station

General information
- Location: Evere, Brussels-Capital Region; Belgium
- System: Railway Station
- Owner: SNCB/NMBS
- Operator: SNCB/NMBS
- Line: 26 (Schaarbeek-Halle)
- Platforms: 2
- Tracks: 2

History
- Opened: 19 July 1926; 100 years ago

Passengers
- 2014: 553
Location
- Location within Belgium Location within Europe

Bordet railway station (French: Gare de Bordet; Dutch: Station Bordet) (Note: Officially Bordet) is a railway station in the municipality of Evere in Brussels, Belgium, operated by the National Railway Company of Belgium (NMBS/SNCB). The station lies on line 26, between Haren and Evere railway stations.

The station is located under street level, at the crossroad between the Chaussée de Haecht/Haachtsesteenweg and the Avenue Jules Bordet/Jules Bordetlaan, next to the border with the City of Brussels. At street level, there are the last stops of Brussels tram route 55 and bus route 59, which offer a connection with regional transport. Bus routes 45 and 69 also stop there.

There are multiple large employers in the Bordet station's area. Together with its location near the centre of Evere and near the crossing of the Avenue Bordet with important roads like the Avenue Léopold III/Leopold III-laan and the Chaussée de Haecht, it makes the area one of the busiest locations in the municipality.

There are plans to extend the Brussels Metro as far as Bordet station.

== Train services ==
The station is served by the following service(s):

- Brussels RER services (S4) Vilvoorde - Merode - Etterbeek - Brussels-Luxembourg - Denderleeuw - Aalst (weekdays, peak hours only)
- Brussels RER services (S5) Mechelen - Brussels-Luxembourg - Etterbeek - Halle - Enghien (- Geraardsbergen) (weekdays)
- Brussels RER services (S7) Mechelen - Merode - Halle (weekdays)
- Brussels RER services (S9) Leuven - Brussels-Luxembourg - Etterbeek - Braine-l'Alleud (weekdays, peak hours only)

Preceding station	NMBS/SNCB	Following station
Haren towards Mechelen	S 4 weekdays	Evere towards Aalst
Haren towards Mechelen	S 5 weekdays	Evere towards Enghien
Haren towards Vilvoorde	S 7 weekdays	Evere towards Halle
Haren towards Leuven	S 9 weekdays	Evere towards Braine-l'Alleud

== Tram services ==
- 55 - Da Vinci - Rogier
- 32 - Da Vinci - Drogenbos Chateau
- 62 - Eurocontrol - Cimetière De Jette

== Bus services ==
- 45 - Roodebeek - Sint-Vincentius
- 59 - Bordet station - Elsene-Etterbeek Hospital
- 80 - Porte De Namur - Maes
- 69 - Schaarbeek station - Jules Bordet
- 270 - Brussels-North - Keerbergen
- 271 - Brussel-Noord - Kampenhout
- 272 - Brussel-Noord - Zaventem Airport
- 471 - Brussel-Noord - Zaventem Airport (Zaventem)

== See also ==
- List of railway stations in Belgium
- Rail transport in Belgium
- Transport in Brussels
- History of Brussels
