= Diegem =

Section of Machelen, Belgium

Coordinates: 50.894232°N 4.435623°E

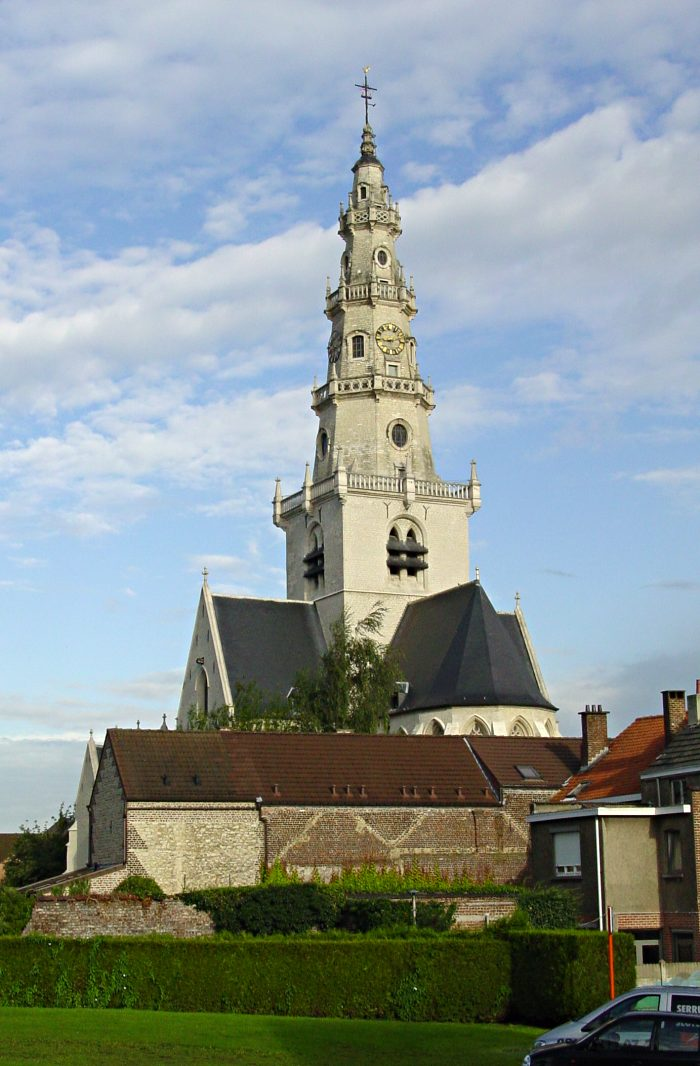
Diegem church spire

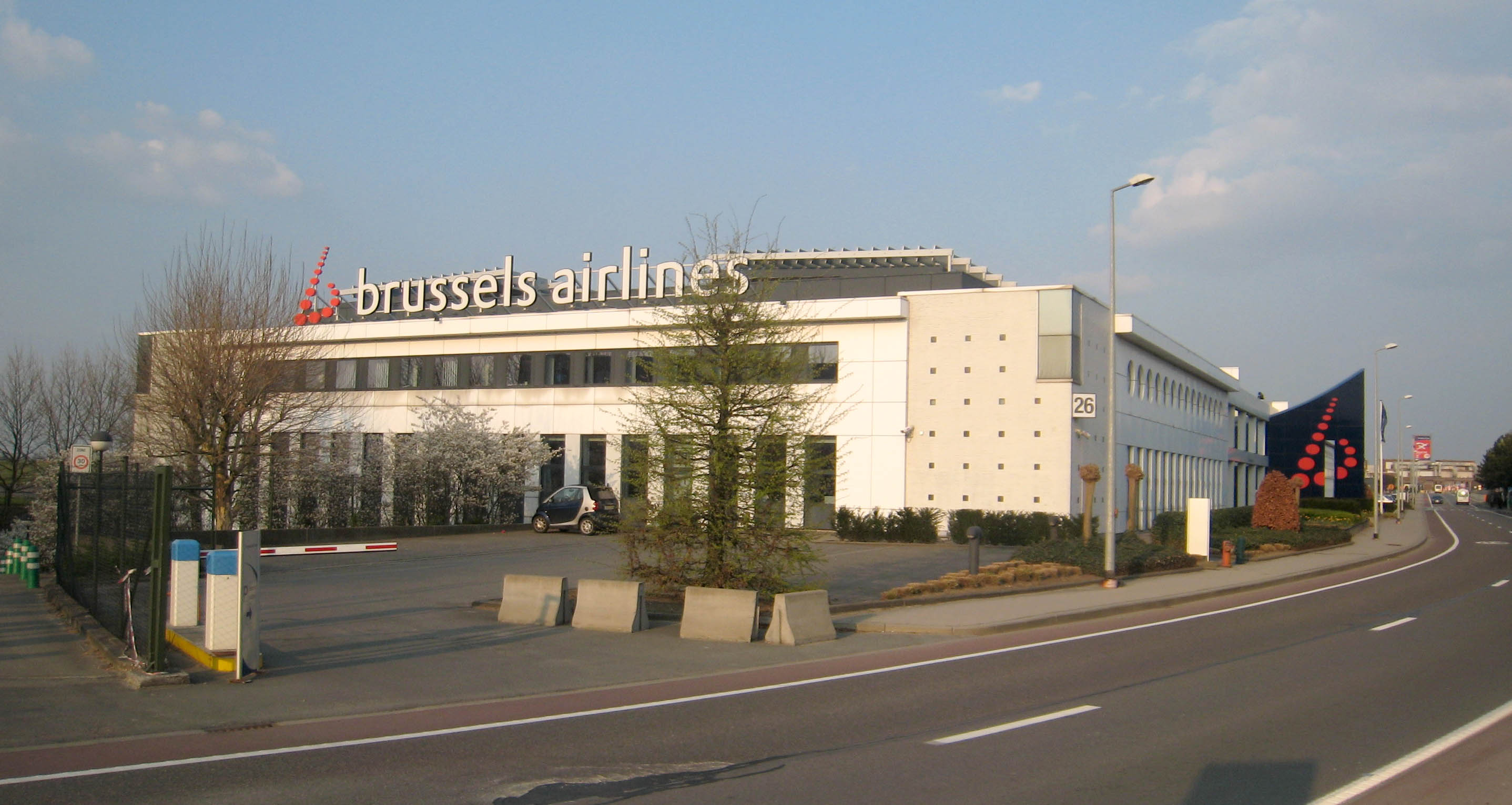
Brussels Airlines head office in Diegem

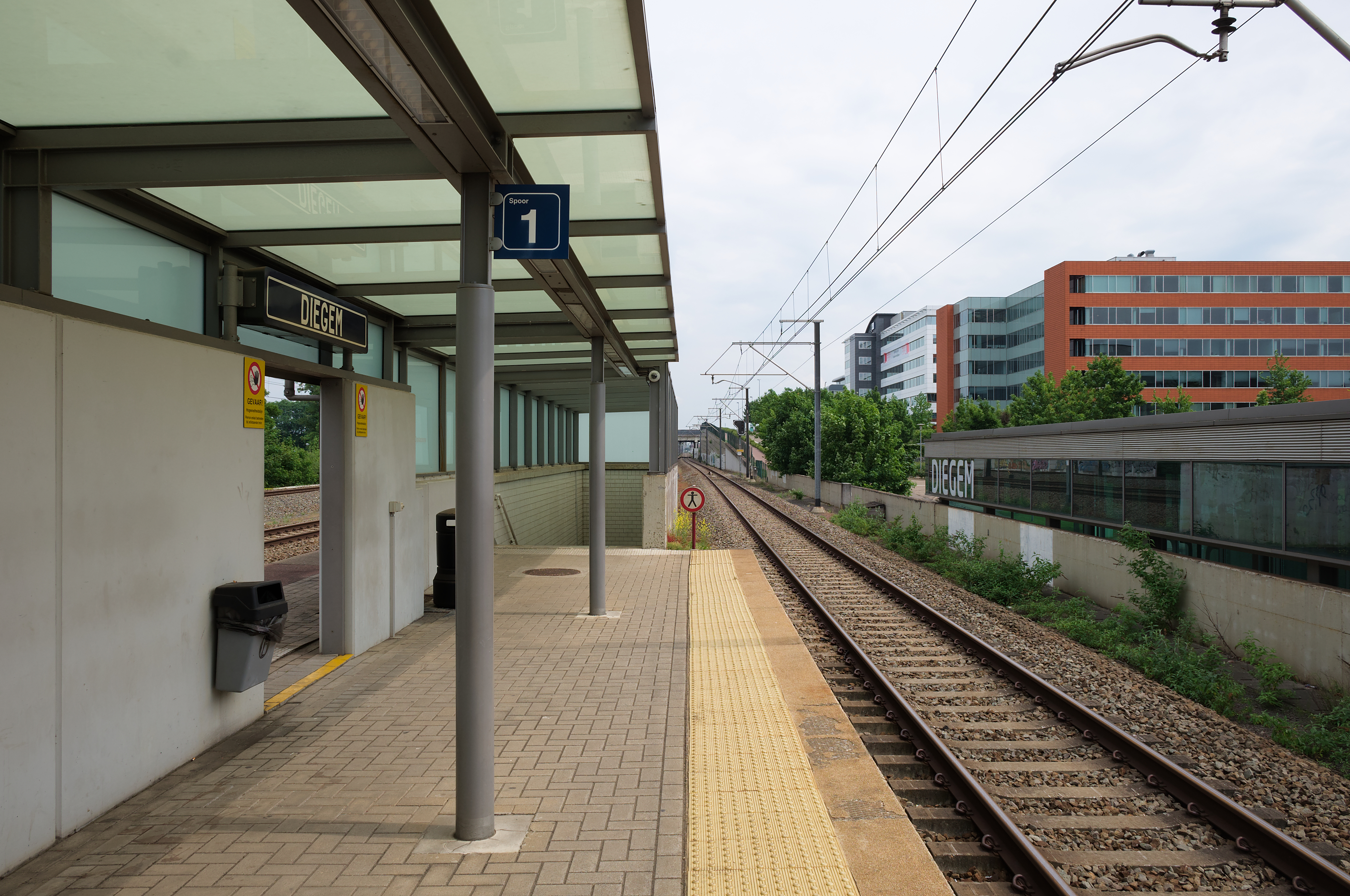
Diegem train station

Diegem is a town in the municipality of Machelen, in the province of Flemish Brabant, Belgium. Diegem's postal code is 1831. The official language of Diegem is Dutch, as in the rest of Flanders.

A portion of Brussels Airport is located in Diegem, together with neighbouring town of Zaventem. Diegem's situation just outside the Brussels-Capital Region and close to the R0 (the Brussels orbital motorway) also means it has a large number of business premises. The town is served by Diegem railway station, which is situated on the Brussels–Leuven railway line between Haren-South and Brussels Airport-Zaventem stations.

== Sights ==
Diegem's Gothic church, inaugurated in 1543, in the centre of town, has a conspicuous tiered spire.

== Economy ==
Brussels Airlines has its corporate head office in the b.house in Zaventem and in Diegem. Brussels Airlines formed in 2006 as a result of a merger between SN Brussels and Virgin Express.

The Europe, Middle East, and Africa operations of Chevron Phillips are based in Stockholm Building in Airport Plaza in Diegem.

The 3M company has had a European office at Hermeslaan 7 in Diegem since 1970.

== Education ==
Primary schools in Diegem include Gemeentelijke Basisschool De Fonkel and Parochiale Basisschool. GISO Machelen provides secondary education to Diegem residents. Bibliotheek Machelen-Diegem is the public library of the town.

== Sports ==
The Superprestige Diegem is a December evening cyclo-cross race held in Diegem, Belgium, which is part of the Superprestige.

Football club Diegem Sport is the town club and plays in the Belgian Third Division.

== Sister Cities ==
Diegem became sister cities with Northbrook, Illinois, USA, in 1966.
