= Evere =

Municipality of the Brussels-Capital Region, Belgium

- Municipality
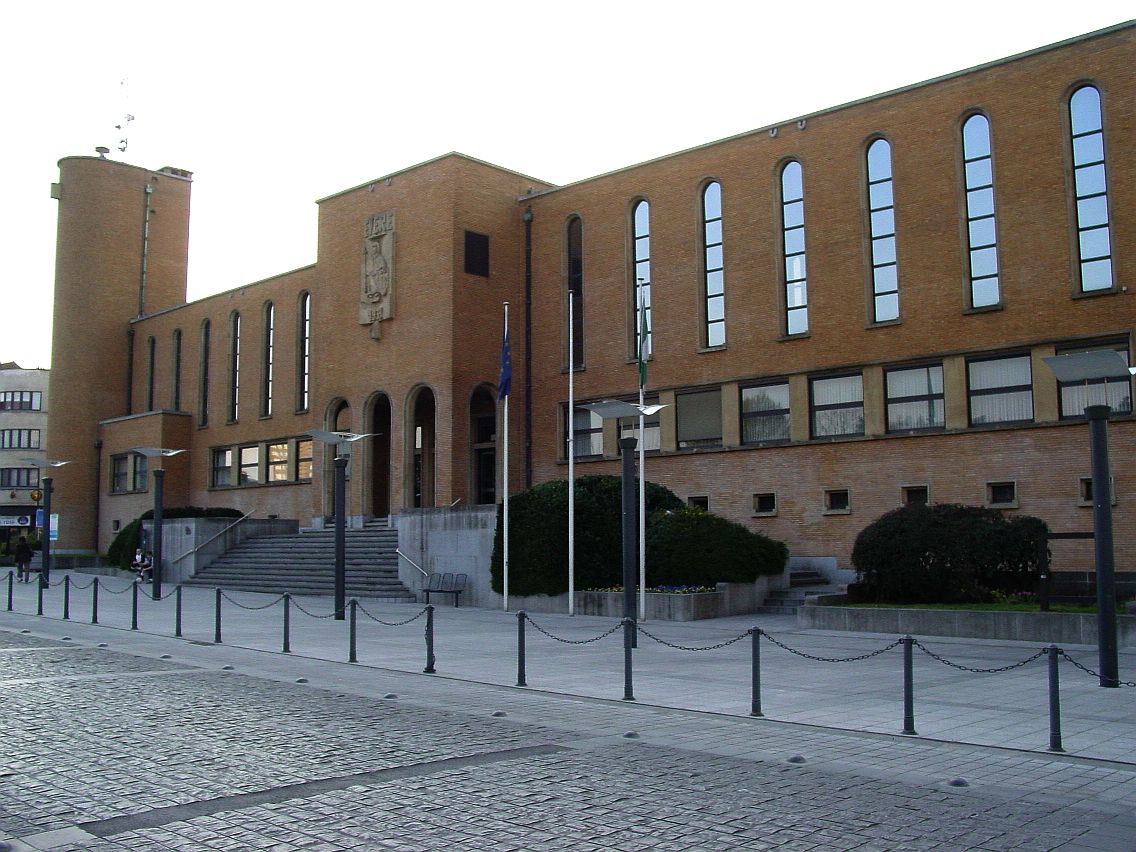
- Evere's Municipal Hall

- Flag Coat of arms

- Evere municipality in the Brussels-Capital Region
- Interactive map of Evere
- Location in Belgium
- Coordinates: 50°52′N 04°24′E
- Country: Belgium
- Community: Flemish Community; French Community
- Region: Brussels-Capital
- Arrondissement: Brussels

Government
  - Mayor: Alessandro Zappala (PS)
  - Governing party: Liste du Bourgmestre (PS) / MR

Area
  - Total: 5.12 km^{2} (1.98 sq mi)

Population (2026-01-01)
  - Total: 45,984
  - Density: 8,980/km^{2} (23,300/sq mi)
- Postal codes: 1140
- NIS code: 21006
- Area codes: 02
- Website: www.evere.be/fr (in French) www.evere.be/nl (in Dutch)

Evere (French: [evɛʁ]; Dutch: [ˈeːvərə]) is one of the 19 municipalities of the Brussels-Capital Region (Belgium). As of 1 January 2022, the municipality had a population of 43,608 inhabitants. The total area is 5.08 km^{2} (1.96 sq mi), which gives a population density of 8,503/km^{2} (22,020/sq mi). Like all municipalities in Brussels, it is officially bilingual (French–Dutch).

== History ==
Evere's character was essentially rural until the end of the First World War. It was famous for its market gardeners, pioneers in the cultivation of chicory (French: chicon, Dutch: witloof). It was also the centre of the history of aviation in Belgium between 1914 and 1945 welcoming, among others, the Société Anonyme Belge de Constructions Aéronautiques (SABCA) and Societé Anonyme Belge d'Exploitation de la Navigation Aérienne (SABENA). Charles Lindbergh flew the Spirit of St. Louis to Haren/Evere Airfield after his historic 1927 transatlantic flight to Paris. He was welcomed by a crowd of over 25,000.

After the Second World War, the explosion of population and the scarcity of free building plots in the Brussels region accelerated the disappearance of agricultural land in Evere in favour of urbanisation. From 1968 onwards, the arrival of the NATO headquarters on the disused site of the old aerodrome in Haren, also brought about the arrival of a number of companies of the tertiary sector.

== Main sights ==
- Brussels Cemetery is partly in Evere and partly in the municipality of Zaventem in Flemish Brabant.
- In September 2008, a former windmill in Evere, originally built in 1841, was opened as the 'Brussels Mill and Food Museum' (Musée bruxellois du Moulin et de l'Alimentation).
- The NATO headquarters are located near Evere in Haren (part of the City of Brussels). Besides, several major international companies have set up their headquarters near Evere, notably KPMG in Haren, Deloitte in Zaventem (previously in Diegem), and Ernst & Young in Diegem.
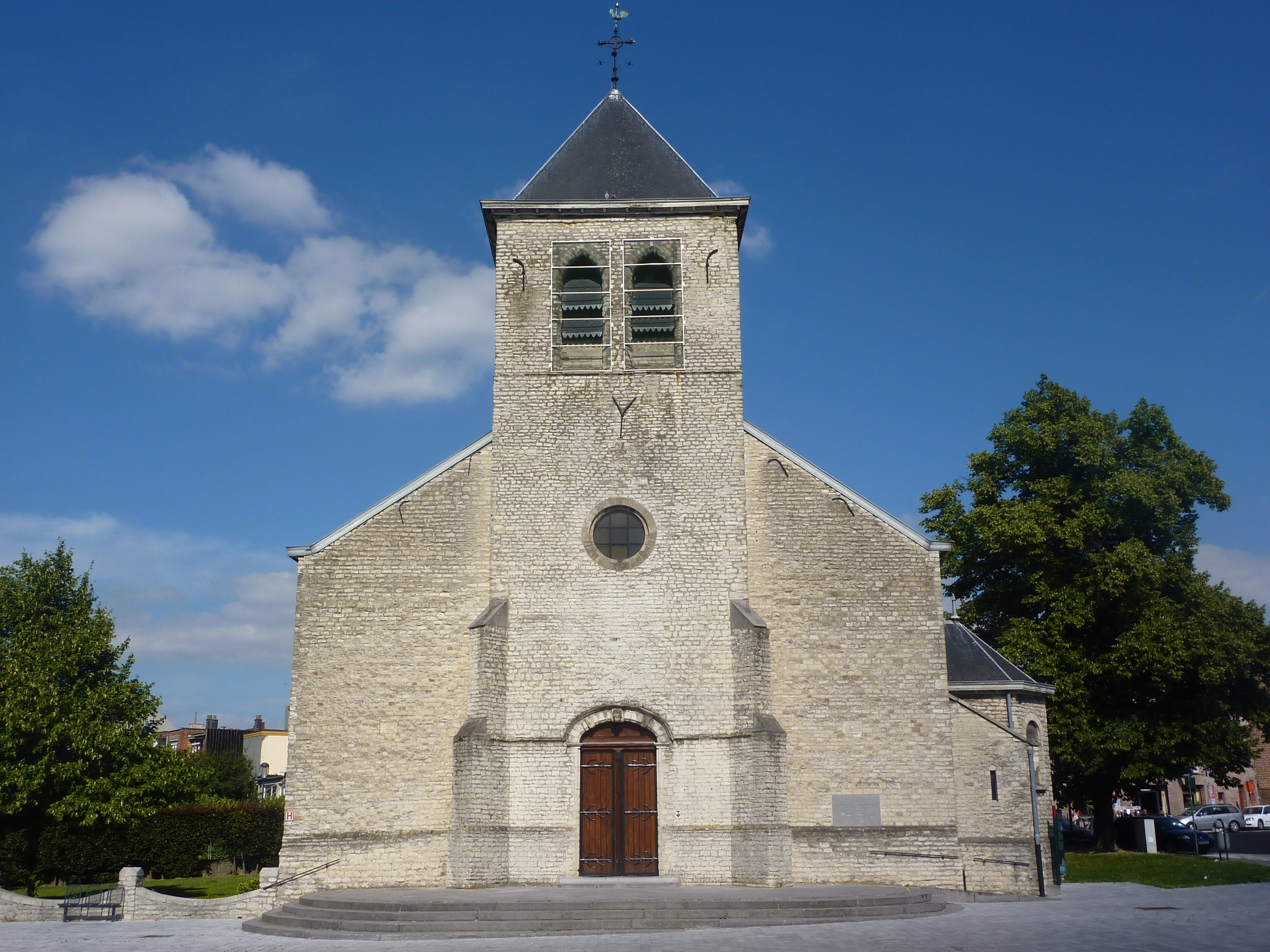
Church of St. Vincent

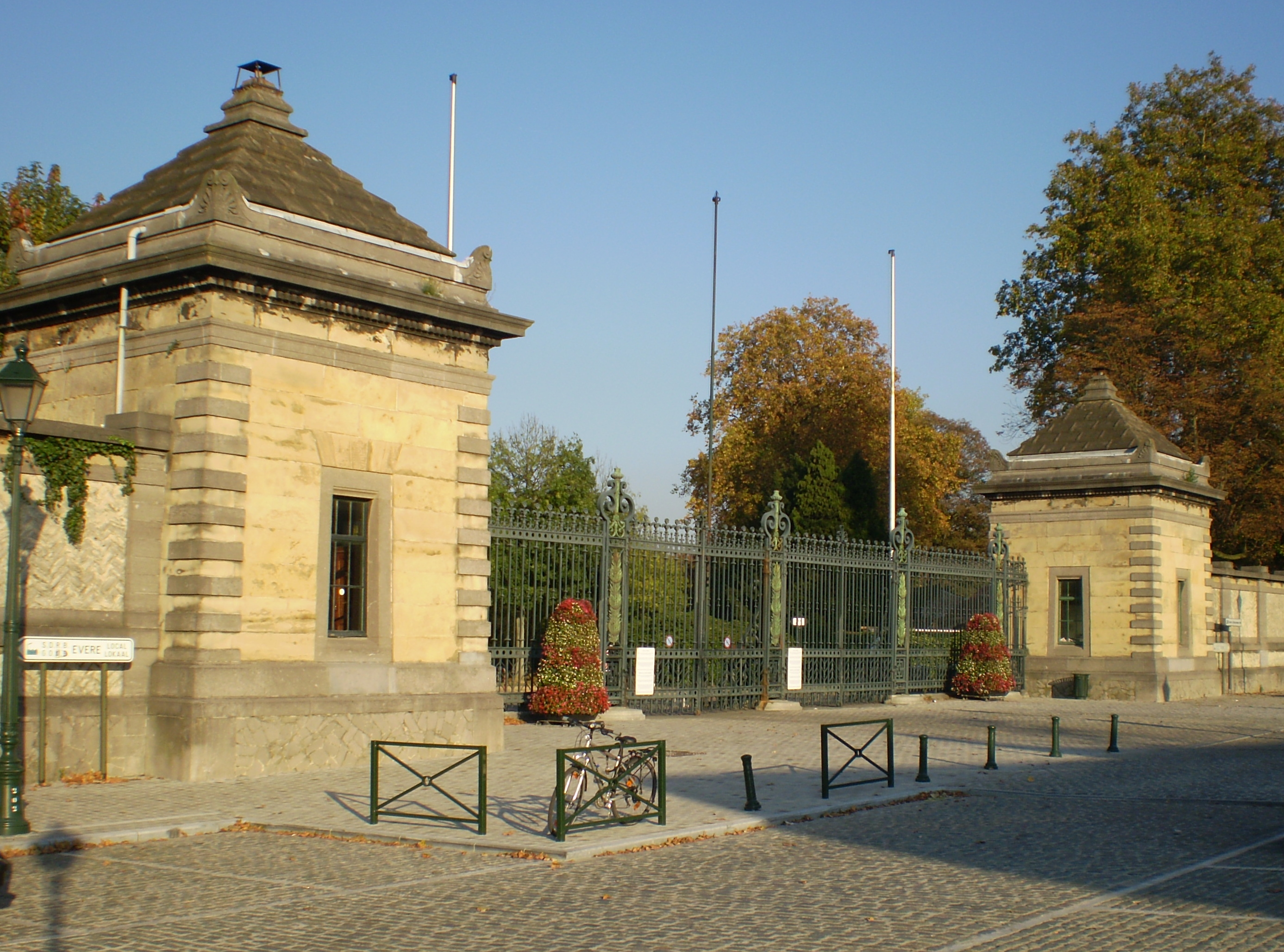
Brussels Cemetery's main entrance

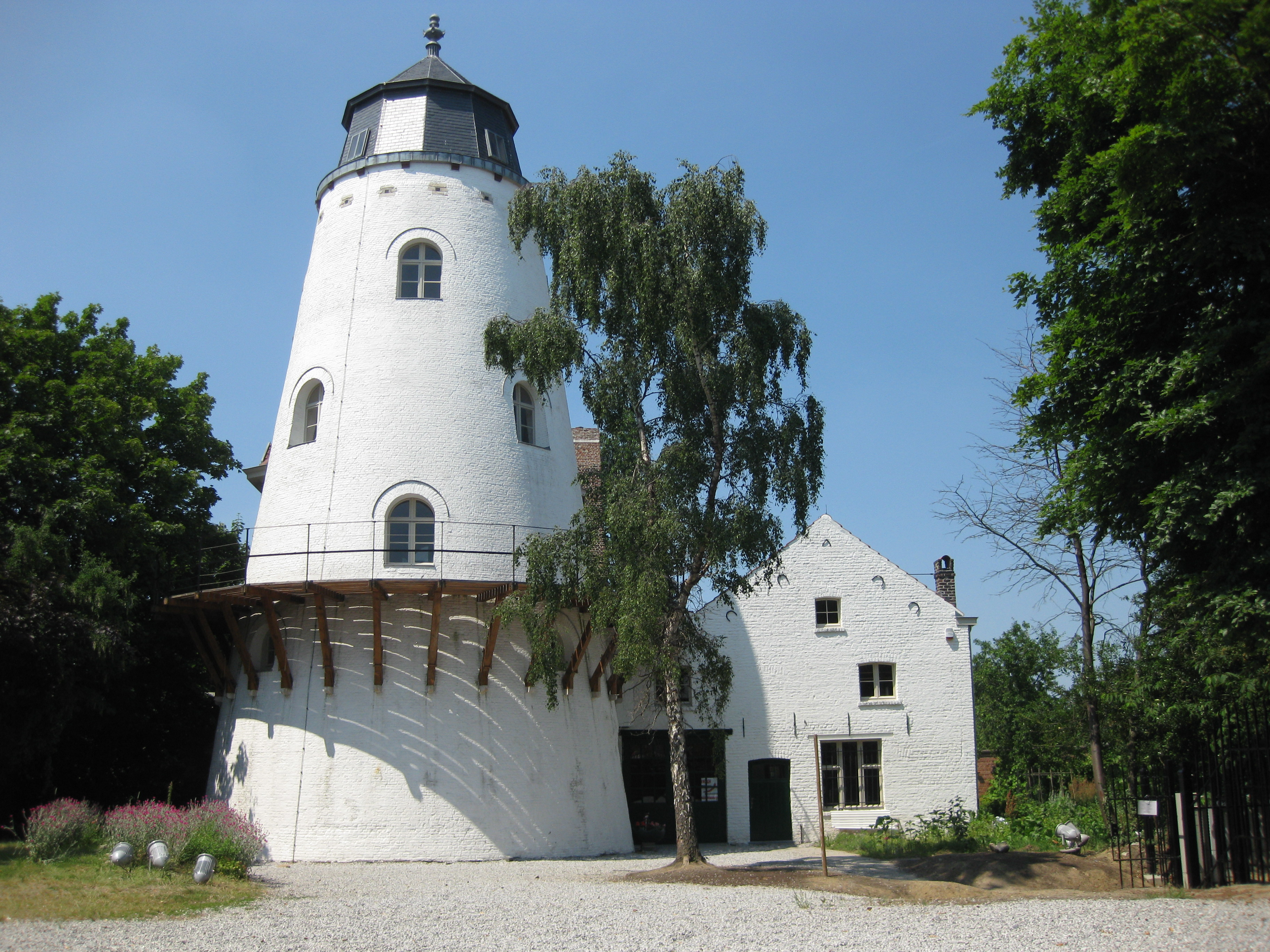
Former windmill at the Brussels Mill and Food Museum

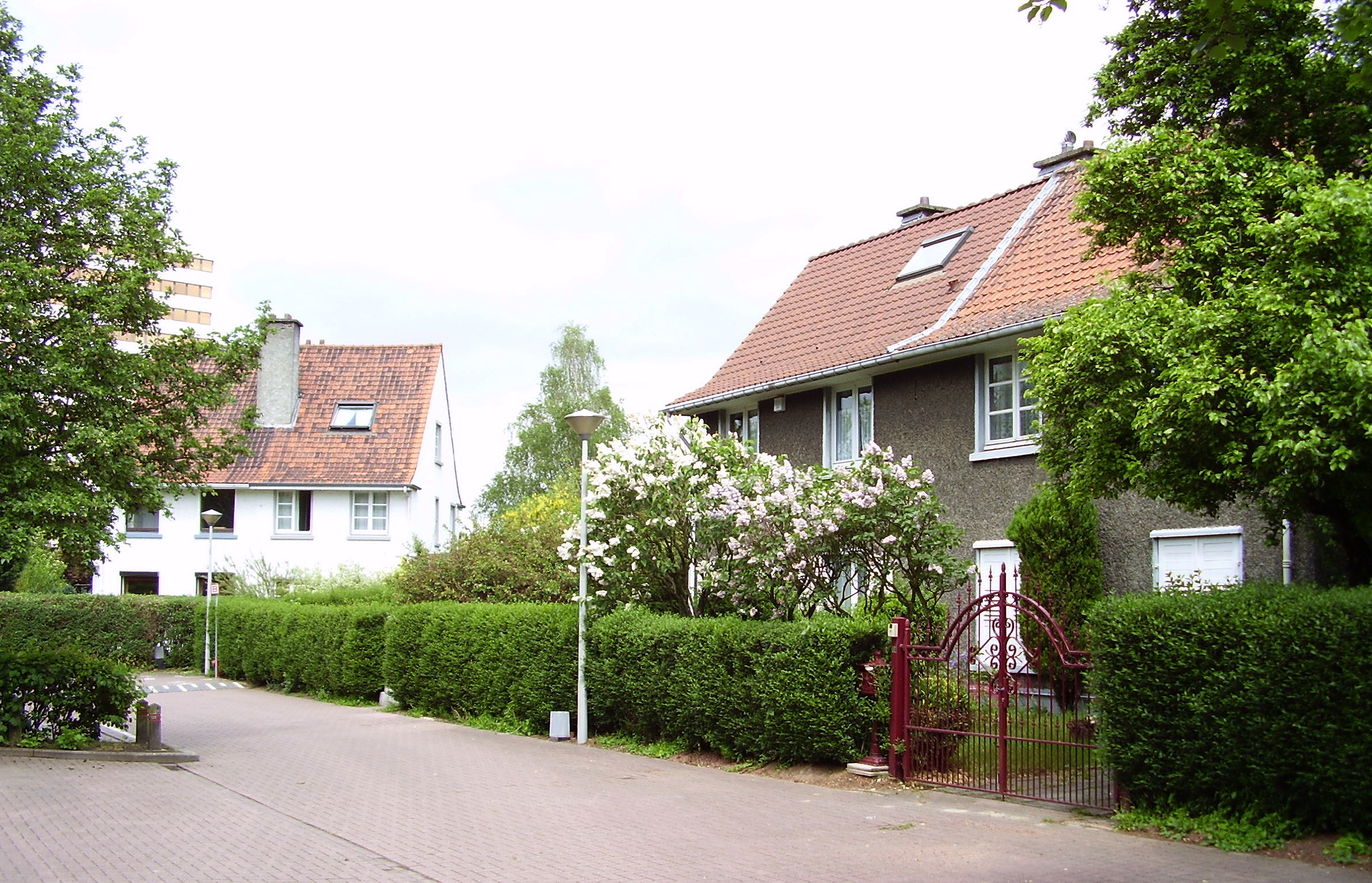
Tuinbouw garden city

== Sport ==
Evere is home to BUC Saint Josse Rugby Club, former Belgian Champions who currently play in the Belgian Elite League.

== Transport ==
Evere is served by Evere railway station on line 26 (which goes from Halle to Vilvoorde). Bordet railway station, on the same line, is also in the municipality.
