= Haren Airport =

Former Military airfield and civil airport in Belgium

Haren Airport Evere Airport (Advanced Landing Ground B-56)
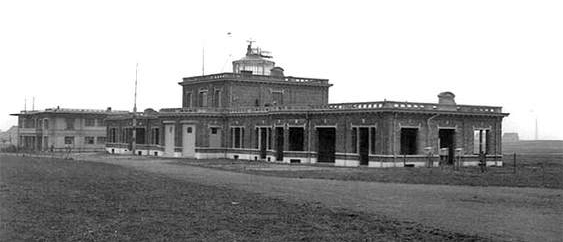
- The airport terminal in 1929
- IATA: none; ICAO: none

Summary
- Airport type: Public
- Location: Brussels (Haren), Belgium
- Coordinates: 50°52′49″N 04°25′09″E

Map
- Location of Haren-Evere Airport

Runways
Direction	Length		Surface
Direction	ft	m	Surface
09/27	2,706	820	Concrete (Closed)

Haren Airport or Evere Airfield is a former military airfield and civil airport in Brussels, Belgium. Located in Brussels' city section of Haren and adjacent municipality of Evere, it was established by the German Empire in 1914 and lasted until the early 1950s when it was closed. Meanwhile it had been replaced by nearby Melsbroek airfield that Nazi Germany had established in World War II, which developed into the current Brussels Airport. The former grounds of Haren-Evere airfield were redeveloped as part of the expanding Brussels urban area; some buildings remain in use as facilities of the Belgian military. Since 2017, NATO headquarters are located at Haren (Brussels) on part of the former airport grounds.

== History ==
The advancing Imperial German Air Service established it as a military airfield Flugplatz Brüssel in 1914 during World War I. In February 1915, they completed an additional Zeppelin hangar. This was partially destroyed on 7 June 1915 during an attack on airship LZ38. Although the hangar was repaired, airships were no longer parked at the airfield. At the end of the war, the airfield was abandoned by the Germans when they withdrew from Belgium in the aftermath of the November 1918 Armistice.

The airfield being in the Belgian capital, it became the home of the Belgian Army Air Force during the 1920s. The Zeppelin hangar was not torn down until 1923, as it was used to park aircraft left behind by the Germans. Some of the aircraft were used for the first civilian flights at the airfield. Increasingly, it became the hub of Belgian civil aviation. In 1923, a radio centre was built, along with a new terminal. In February 1925, Sabena inaugurated the first Congo flight, when a Handley Page W8f departed the airfield for Leopoldstad. A notable visitor was Charles Lindbergh, who flew into Haren only a week after his historic New-York-Paris flight in 1927. Air traffic continued its steady growth, and by 1929 a new terminal (the third) was inaugurated. Several international airlines used Haren in the 1930s, such as Imperial Airways, KLM, Air France, Deutsche Luft Hansa and British Continental Airways.

After the German invasion of Belgium in May 1940, the Luftwaffe expanded the airfield, by building a new hangar (VIII) and an 820m long concrete runway (09-27). In addition, the Germans began building a new airfield at nearby Melsbroek (near Zaventem) and in November 1942 had connected the two airfields with a taxiway.

On 3 September 1944 Haren-Evere area was liberated, and only three days later the first Royal Air Force squadrons landed. It was designated as Advanced Landing Ground B-56 Evere. As the Germans had left in a hurry, the twin airfields needed very little repair work. Between September 1944 and October 1945, the British further expanded the runways, taxiways and aprons. When World War II ended, the two airfields continued to be used by the military. It took until March 1946 before the airfields were fully released for civilian use.

Due to the encroaching urban area of Brussels, the Haren-Evere airfield began shutting down in the late 1940s and airport development focused on its twin airfield nearby, Melsbroek (which eventually developed into the current Brussels Airport), although repair services of Sabena and the Belgian Air Force would remain in Haren-Evere until the early 1950s, which is when all aircraft handling activities ceased.

== Aftermath ==
In the 1950s, all the runways were broken up, and the airport terrain was subsequently divided and used for new roads, office blocks, military terrain and smaller residential sections.

In 1961, Belgium began using the former air terminal at Haren as its Tactical Air Forces headquarters, also called King Albert Barracks. To the south of that, across the expressway Leopold III Boulevard, another military domain, called Queen Elisabeth Quarter, was set up, hosting the headquarters of the Belgian Army command. In 1967, NATO moved its headquarters at Brussels (Haren) to a section of this southern portion of the former airfield terrain, after a hasty departure from Paris caused by the withdrawal of France from under NATO's military command structure.

In 2002, the Belgian Government offered much of King Albert Barracks to NATO, for relocation and building of a new headquarters complex at Haren (Brussels). The new headquarters of NATO was dedicated on the site in 2017.

The airfield was the first location of SABCA, and hosted its headquarters ever since, its last link to aviation.
