= Haren-South railway station =

Railway station in Brussels, Belgium

Haren-South
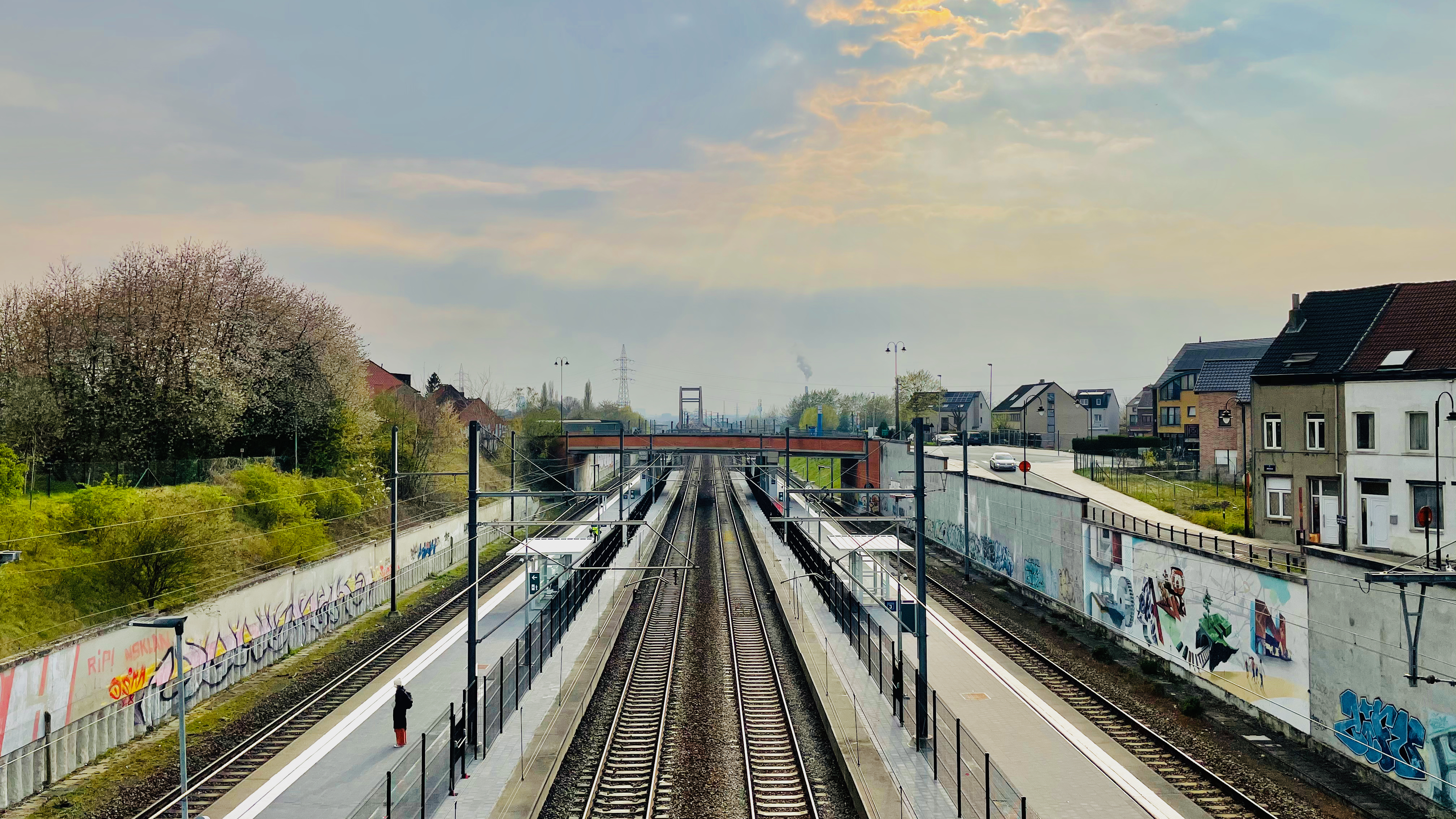
- Haren-South railway station

General information
- Location: Rue de Verdun / Verdunstraat 76; B-1130 Haren, City of Brussels, Brussels-Capital Region; Belgium
- Coordinates: 50°53′21.1″N 4°24′51.8″E
- System: Railway Station
- Owner: SNCB/NMBS
- Operator: SNCB/NMBS
- Tracks: 4

Services
| Preceding station | NMBS/SNCB | Following station |
|---|---|---|
| Diegem towards Leuven | S 2 | Schaarbeek towards Braine-le-Comte |
Location
- Location within Belgium Location within Europe

Haren-South railway station (French: Gare de Haren-Sud, Dutch: Station Haren-Zuid) (Note: Officially Haren-South (French: Haren-Sud, Dutch: Haren-Zuid)) is a railway station on line 36 of the Belgian railway network. It is situated in Haren, part of the City of Brussels in the Brussels-Capital Region, Belgium. The train services are operated by the National Railway Company of Belgium (NMBS/SNCB).

Also in Haren, despite its name 200 metres (660 ft) to the south-east along Oude Middelweg, is Haren railway station, on line 26.

== Train services ==
The station is served by the following service:

- Brussels RER services (S2) Leuven - Brussels - Halle - Braine-le-Comte

== See also ==
- List of railway stations in Belgium
- Rail transport in Belgium
- Transport in Brussels
- History of Brussels
