= Meiser railway station =

Railway station in Brussels, Belgium

Meiser
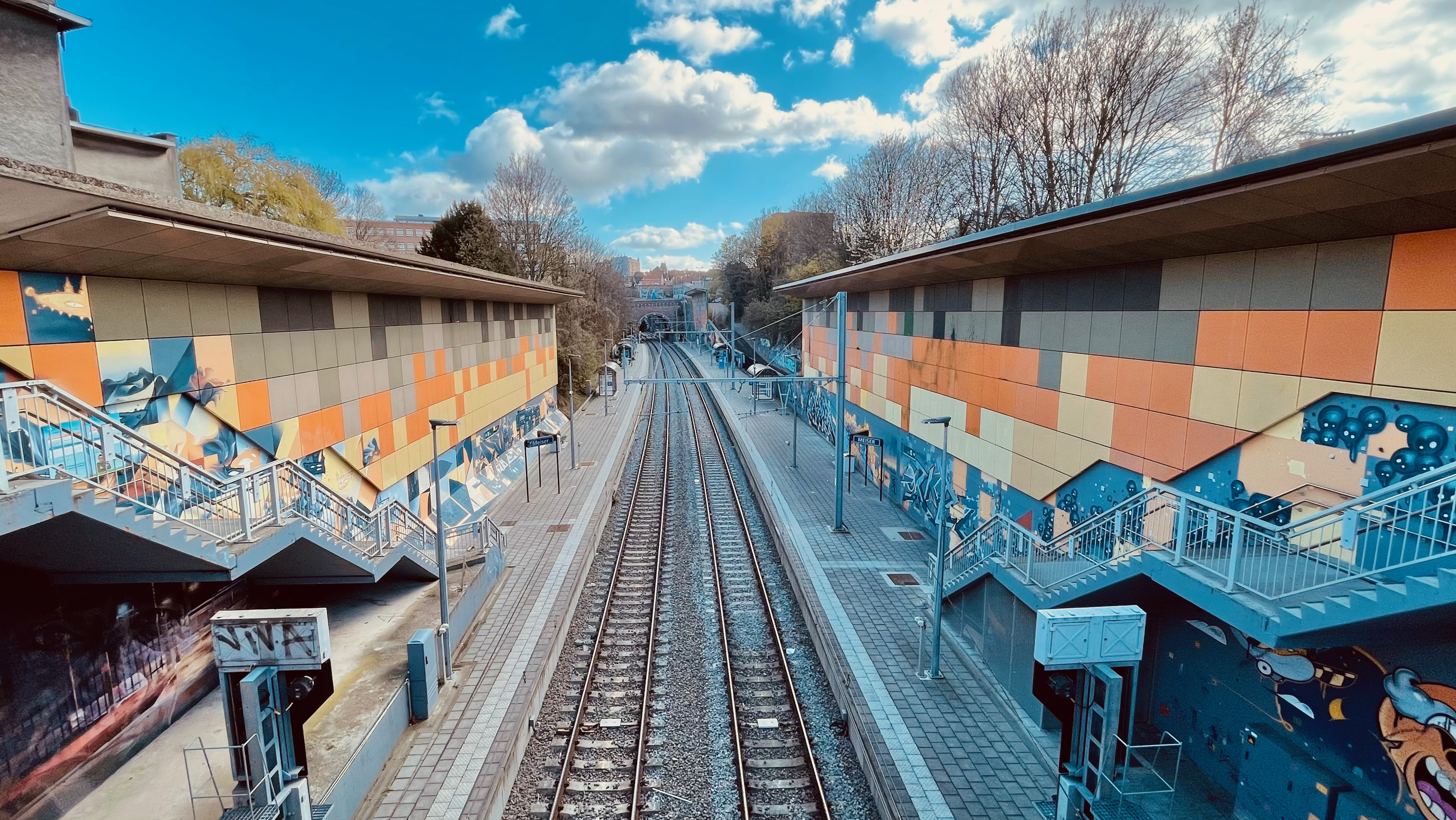
- Meiser railway station

General information
- Location: Schaerbeek, Brussels-Capital Region; Belgium
- Coordinates: 50°51′17″N 4°23′38″E
- System: Railway Station
- Owner: SNCB/NMBS
- Operator: SNCB/NMBS
- Line: 26
- Platforms: 2
- Tracks: 2

Other information
- Station code: (H)

History
- Opened: 1976; 50 years ago

Passengers
- 2014: 418 per day
Location
- Location within Belgium Location within Europe

Meiser railway station (French: Gare de Meiser; Dutch: Station Meiser) (Note: Officially Meiser) is a railway station in the municipality of Schaerbeek in Brussels, Belgium, opened in 1976. It is located on line 26, between Schaerbeek-Josaphat and of Merode stations. The Meiser crossroad on the Greater Ring is located a hundred meters away from the station, which lies under the Chaussée de Louvain/Leuvensesteenweg. The station can be accessed via the Chaussée de Louvain, the Avenue Rogier/Rogierlaan or the Rue de la Luzerne/Luzernestraat. The train services are operated by the National Railway Company of Belgium (NMBS/SNCB).

== Train services ==
The station is served by the following service(s):

- Brussels RER services (S4) Vilvoorde - Merode - Etterbeek - Brussels-Luxembourg - Denderleeuw - Aalst (weekdays, peak hours only)
- Brussels RER services (S5) Mechelen - Brussels-Luxembourg - Etterbeek - Halle - Enghien (- Geraardsbergen) (weekdays)
- Brussels RER services (S7) Mechelen - Merode - Halle (weekdays)
- Brussels RER services (S9) Leuven - Brussels-Luxembourg - Etterbeek - Braine-l'Alleud (weekdays, peak hours only)

Preceding station	NMBS/SNCB	Following station
Evere towards Mechelen	S 4 weekdays	Merode towards Aalst
Evere towards Mechelen	S 5 weekdays	Brussels-Schuman towards Enghien
Evere towards Vilvoorde	S 7 weekdays	Merode towards Halle
Evere towards Leuven	S 9 weekdays	Brussels-Schuman towards Braine-l'Alleud

== Connections ==
The station offers a correspondence with Brussels tram route 25, which runs between Rogier and Boondael railway station, as well as tram route 62.

Bus services 318, 351 and 358 serve the station, stopping at its south side.

== See also ==
- List of railway stations in Belgium
- Rail transport in Belgium
- Transport in Brussels
- History of Brussels
