= Belgian railway line 36 =

Railway line between Brussels and Liège, Belgium

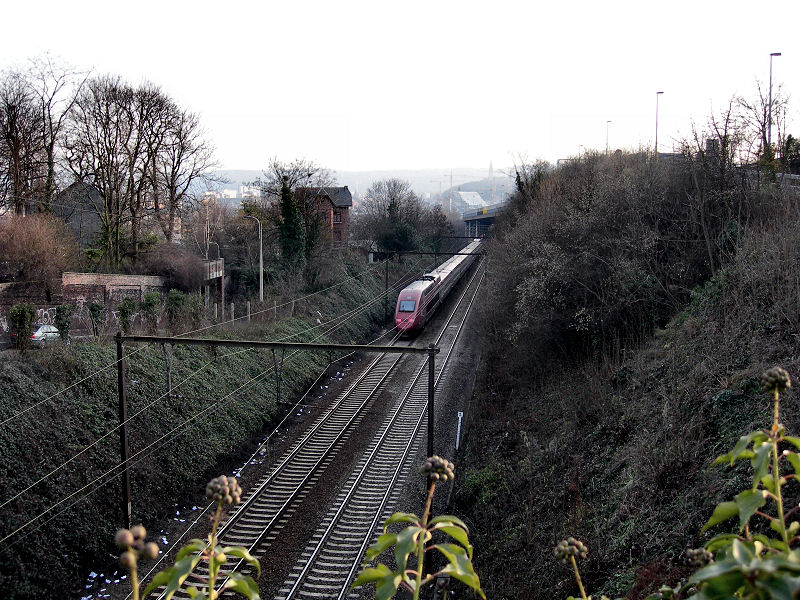
- A Thalys train on line 36 in 2006

Overview
- Status: Operational
- Locale: Belgium
- Termini: Brussels-North railway station; Liège-Guillemins railway station

Service
Services
- Operator(s): National Railway Company of Belgium

History
- Opened: 1837-1866

Technical
- Line length: 100 km (62 mi)
- Number of tracks: double track
- Track gauge: 1,435 mm (4 ft 8 1/2 in) standard gauge
- Electrification: 3 kV DC
Route map
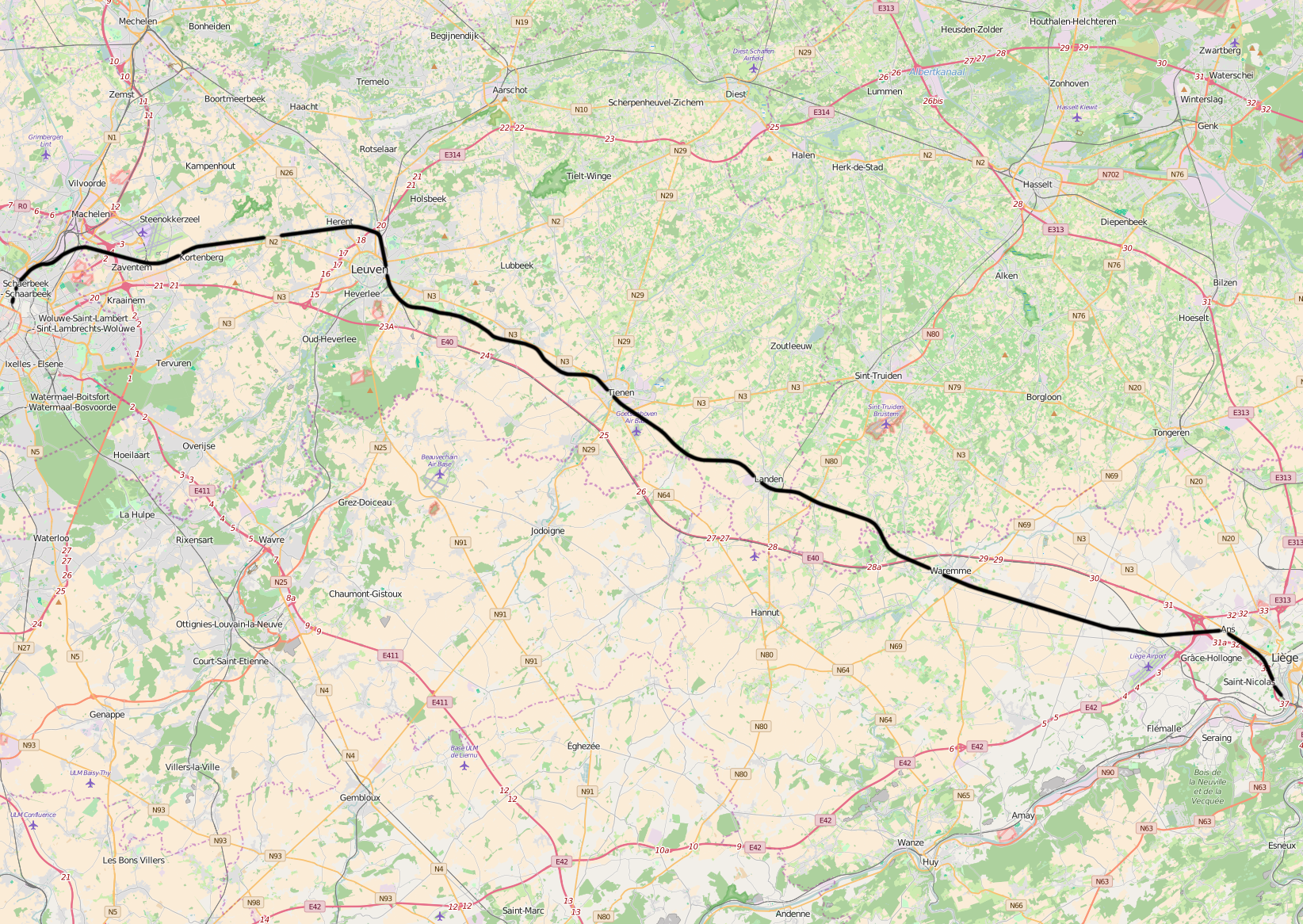

The Belgian railway line 36 is a railway line in Belgium connecting Brussels to Liège. Completed in 1866, the line runs 99.3 km. Trains running between Brussels and Aachen in Germany use the line as far as Liège, and then line 37 between Liège and the German border, the last stop in Belgium being Hergenrath.

Between Schaerbeek and Leuven, the line is 4-track; the outer tracks serve local trains with many stops, while the central tracks carry intercity and high-speed trains; these are called L36N, and branch off after Leuven onto a separate route that mostly follows the E40 motorway towards Liege. The Diabolo project connects L36 to the station under Brussels Airport.

The following stations are located on the line:

- Brussels-North
- Schaerbeek/Schaarbeek
- Haren-South
- Diegem
- Zaventem
- Brussels Airport-Zaventem
- Kortenberg
- Erps-Kwerps
- Veltem
- Herent
- Leuven
- Vertrijk
- Tienen
- Ezemaal
- Neerwinden
- Landen
- Waremme
- Bleret
- Remicourt
- Momalle
- Fexhe-le-Haut-Clocher
- Voroux-Goreux
- Bierset-Awans
- Ans
- Liège-Guillemins

== Inclined Planes of Liège ==
Between Ans and Liège, the railway line has to descend 109 m (358 ft) within less than 8 km (5 mi). This steep incline was initially negotiated with the help of a fixed engine driving an endless rope that was used to haul the trains without the help of a locomotive. After the late 1860s, special banking locomotives were used and the fixed engine was discarded. Another line (line 36A) was built to bypass the incline, but this line is only used by freight trains.

When line 36 was electrified in 1955, most of the trains still needed a banking engine. Currently, some trains are powerful enough to climb the incline without a helper and the rest are provided with two locomotives. The rear engine is no longer removed at Ans in order to save time.
