= Belgian railway line 26 =

Railway line between Brussels and Halle, Belgium

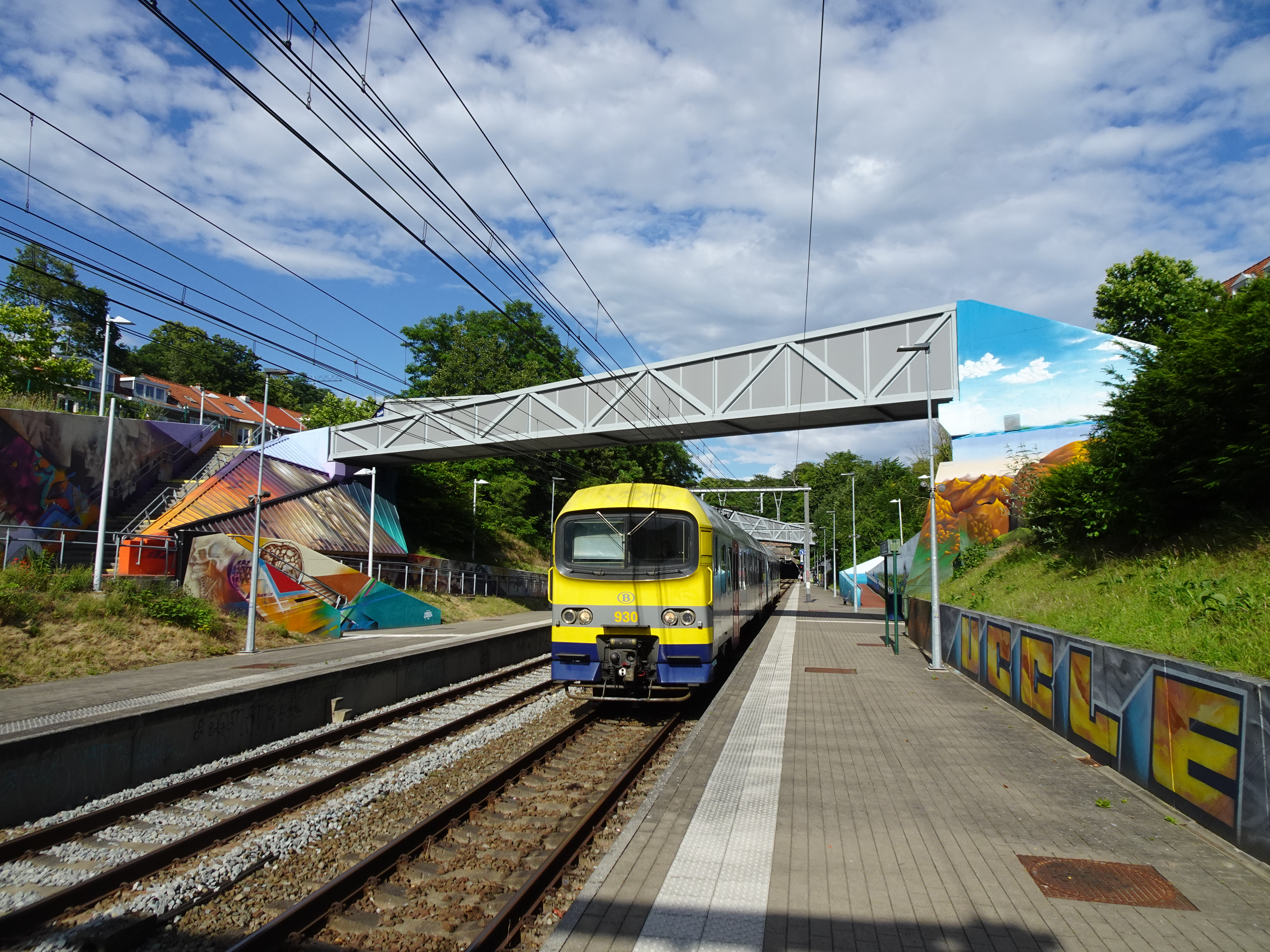
- An MS/AM86 train at Vivier d'Oie/Diesdelle station in 2020

Overview
- Status: Operational
- Locale: Belgium
- Termini: Schaerbeek railway station; Halle railway station

Service
Services
- Operator(s): National Railway Company of Belgium

History
- Opened: 1926-1930

Technical
- Line length: 28 km (17 mi)
- Number of tracks: double track
- Track gauge: 1,435 mm (4 ft 8 1/2 in) standard gauge
- Electrification: 3 kV DC
Route map
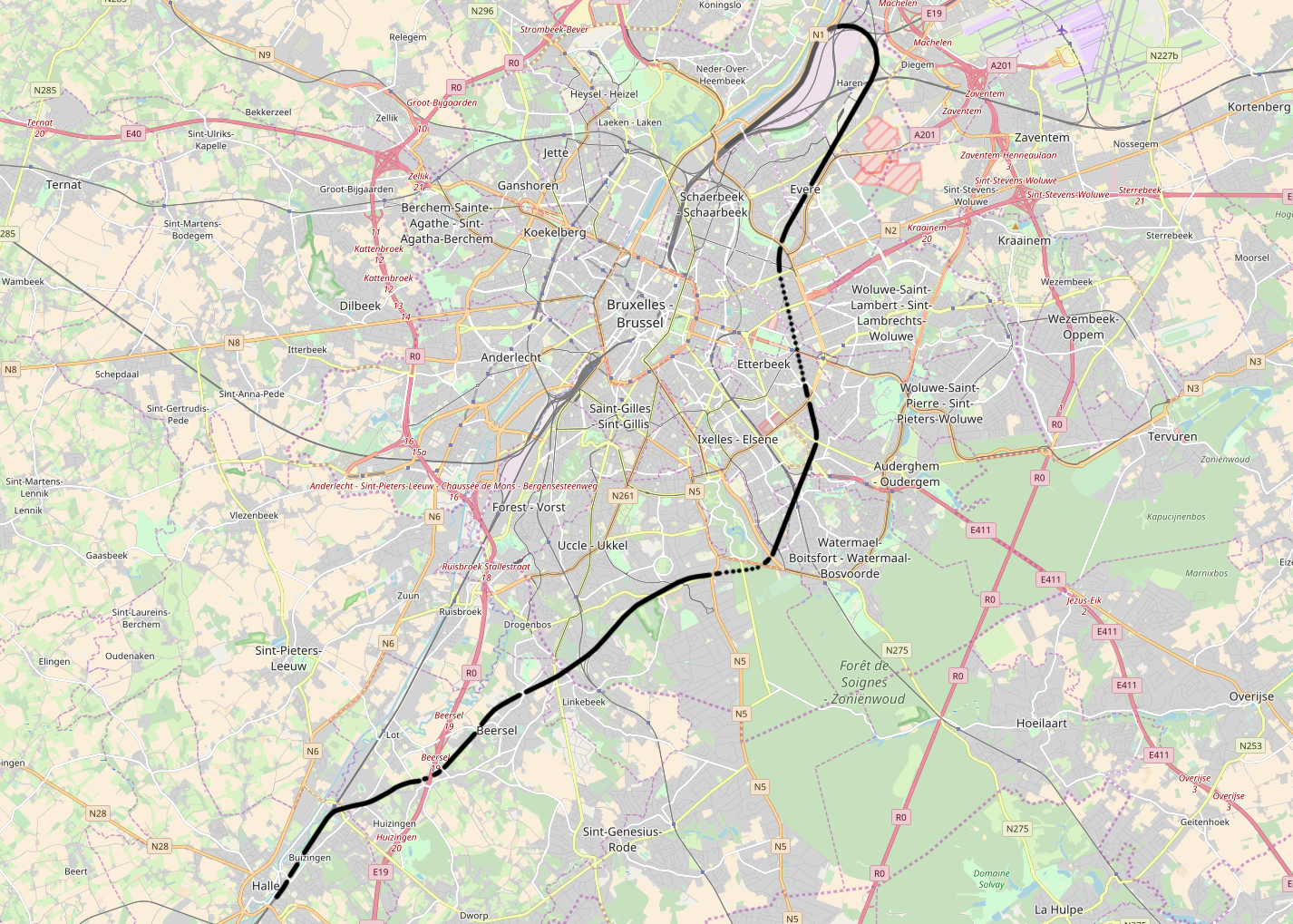

The Belgian railway line 26 is a railway line in Belgium connecting Brussels to Halle. It opened on 19 July 1926 between Schaerbeek and Watermael railway stations. The line was completed on 3 January 1930. It was built to bypass Brussels before the 1952 North–South connection existed.

Today, all passenger trains using the line travel from Vilvoorde on a branch line called 26/1 and not from Schaerbeek, to various destinations south of Brussels. The line carries (parts of) several services of the GEN/RER: S4, S5, S7, S9. Some of these use the Schuman-Josaphat tunnel, which branches off just south of Meiser station.

The line serves the following stations:

- Schaerbeek/Schaarbeek
- Haren
- Bordet
- Evere
- Schaerbeek-Josaphat
- Meiser
- Merode
- Etterbeek-Cinquantenaire
- Delta
- Boondael/Bondaal
- Vivier d'Oie/Diesdelle
- Saint-Job/Sint-Job
- Moensberg
- Beersel
- Huizingen
- Halle

Schaarbeek-Josaphat is no longer an operational station, it was a freight yard very near the present Evere railway station. Etterbeek-Cinquantenaire was also a freight station, now closed and (mostly) filled in.
