= List of municipalities of the Brussels-Capital Region =

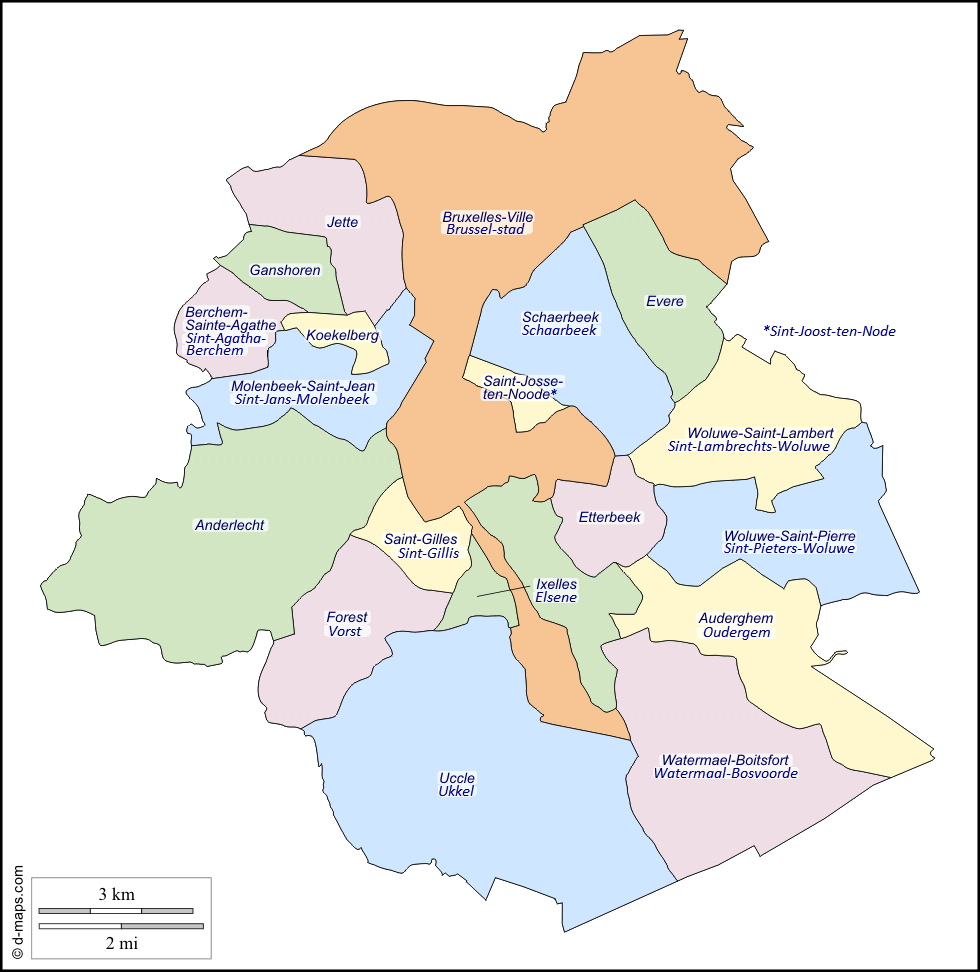
Map displaying the municipalities of the Brussels-Capital Region

The 19 municipalities of the Brussels-Capital Region are the political subdivisions of Belgium's central region. The government of each municipality is responsible for the handling of local level duties, such as law enforcement and the upkeep of schools and roads within its borders. Municipal administration is also conducted by a mayor, a council, and an executive.

In 1831, Belgium was divided into 2,739 municipalities, including 20 within the current Brussels-Capital Region (which at that time did not exist). In 1841, a 21st and 22nd municipality were created when Berchem-Sainte-Agathe formally separated from neighbouring Koekelberg and Jette-Ganshoren split into Jette and Ganshoren. Since then, three municipalities have been merged with the City of Brussels: Laeken, Haren, and Neder-Over-Heembeek, in 1921. Unlike most of the municipalities in Belgium, the ones located in the Brussels-Capital Region were not merged with others during mergers occurring in 1964, 1970, and 1975. However, many territorial changes have occurred, predominantly between the City of Brussels and its neighbouring municipalities.

The largest and most populous of the municipalities is the City of Brussels, covering 32.6 km^{2} (12.6 sq mi) with 176,545 inhabitants. The least populous is Koekelberg with 21,609 inhabitants, and the smallest in area is Saint-Josse-ten-Noode, which is only 1.1 km^{2} (0.4 sq mi) and also has the highest population density, at 24,650/km^{2} (63,800/sq mi). Watermael-Boitsfort has the lowest population density, at 1,928/km^{2} (4,990/sq mi).

== List ==
The names of the municipalities are given in the two official languages of the Brussels-Capital Region: French and Dutch.

No.	French name	Dutch name	Flag	CoA	Postcode	Population (1/1/2017)	Area	Population density (km^{2})	Ref.
1	Anderlecht	Anderlecht			1070	118,241	17.7 km^{2} (6.8 sq mi)	6,680	
2	Auderghem	Oudergem			1160	33,313	9.0 km^{2} (3.5 sq mi)	3,701	
3	Berchem-Sainte-Agathe	Sint-Agatha-Berchem			1082	24,701	2.9 km^{2} (1.1 sq mi)	8,518	
4	Ville de Bruxelles*	Stad Brussel*			1000; 1020; 1030; 1040; 1050; 1120; 1130	176,545	32.6 km^{2} (12.6 sq mi)	5,415	
5	Etterbeek	Etterbeek			1040	47,414	3.1 km^{2} (1.2 sq mi)	15,295	
6	Evere	Evere			1140	40,394	5.0 km^{2} (1.9 sq mi)	8,079	
7	Forest	Vorst			1190	55,746	6.2 km^{2} (2.4 sq mi)	8,991	
8	Ganshoren	Ganshoren			1083	24,596	2.5 km^{2} (1.0 sq mi)	9,838	
9	Ixelles	Elsene			1050	86,244	6.3 km^{2} (2.4 sq mi)	13,690	
10	Jette	Jette			1090	51,933	5.0 km^{2} (1.9 sq mi)	10,387	
11	Koekelberg	Koekelberg			1081	21,609	1.2 km^{2} (0.5 sq mi)	18,008	
12	Molenbeek-Saint-Jean	Sint-Jans-Molenbeek			1080	96,629	5.9 km^{2} (2.3 sq mi)	16,378	
13	Saint-Gilles	Sint-Gillis	Saint-Gilles-lez-Bruxelles		1060	50,471	2.5 km^{2} (1.0 sq mi)	20,188	
14	Saint-Josse-ten-Noode	Sint-Joost-ten-Node	Sint-Josse-ten-Noode		1210	27,115	1.1 km^{2} (0.4 sq mi)	24,650	
15	Schaerbeek	Schaarbeek	Koekelberg		1030	133,042	8.1 km^{2} (3.1 sq mi)	16,425	
16	Uccle	Ukkel	Uccle		1180	82,307	22.9 km^{2} (8.8 sq mi)	3,594	
17	Watermael-Boitsfort	Watermaal-Bosvoorde	Watermael-Boitsfort		1170	24,871	12.9 km^{2} (5.0 sq mi)	1,928	
18	Woluwe-Saint-Lambert	Sint-Lambrechts-Woluwe			1200	55,216	7.2 km^{2} (2.8 sq mi)	7,669	
19	Woluwe-Saint-Pierre	Sint-Pieters-Woluwe			1150	41,217	8.9 km^{2} (3.4 sq mi)	4,631	

* — English: "City of Brussels"/"Brussels-City"

== See also ==
- List of municipalities of Belgium
- Municipalities with language facilities
