= Beliris =

Beliris is a joint venture between the Belgian Federal State and the Brussels Region.

== Governance ==
Beliris is responsible for a range of construction projects in Belgium, improving infrastructure and cementing Brussels' role as a European capital. It is responsible for building new transport infrastructure, urban renewal, and restoring some historic buildings.

Initially, the federal government allocated €125 million of annual funding; but the 2023-2024 budget is €771 million to support some major projects.

== Projects ==
Beliris has a large catalogue of projects. These include:

- Northern section of Brussels Metro line 3
- Schuman-Josaphat tunnel
- Reconstruction of the Robert Schuman Roundabout
- Belliard-Schuman-Kortenberg road tunnel
- Cinquantenaire Park renewal

Beliris has been (or was) also commissioning a study into the feasibility of "The Highlane," a link between Brussels-Luxembourg station and Schuman station for pedestrians and cyclists.
