= Mortsel-Liersesteenweg railway station =

Railway station in Antwerp, Belgium

Mortsel-Liersesteenweg
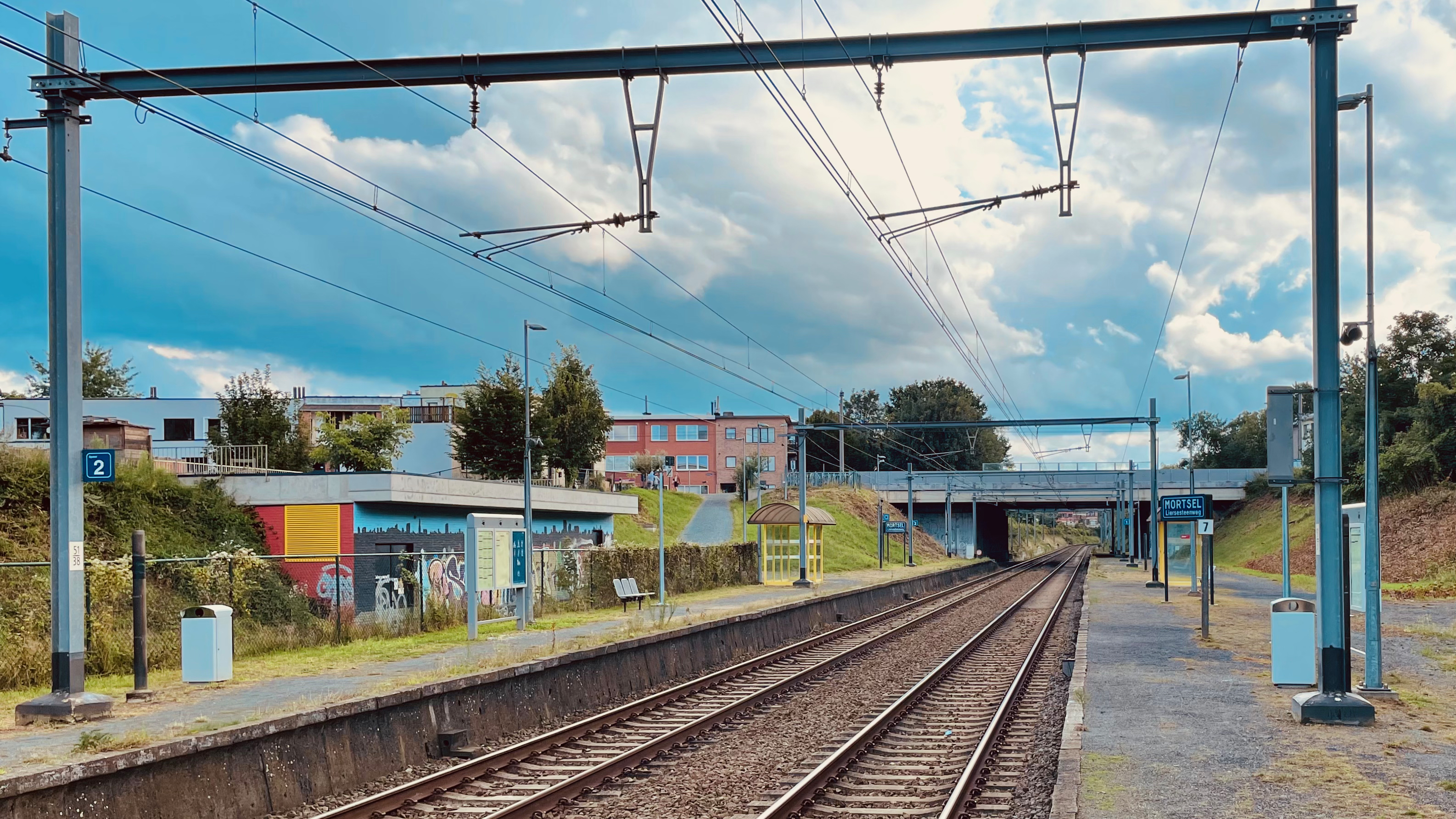
- Mortsel-Liersesteenweg railway station

General information
- Location: Mortsel, Antwerp, Belgium
- Coordinates: 51°10′09″N 4°28′08″E
- System: Railway Station
- Owner: National Railway Company of Belgium
- Line: 27
- Platforms: 2
- Tracks: 2

History
- Opened: 1933, 15 December 2008
- Closed: 1939
Location

Mortsel-Liersesteenweg is a railway station in Mortsel, just south of the city of Antwerp, Antwerp, Belgium. The station opened in 1933 as Mortsel-Oude-God on Line 27. The station closed in 1939 and reopened in December 2008.

== History ==
Due to protests from residents and businesses, the station Mortsel-Oude-God was moved onto Line 25 in 1939. The station was renamed Mortsel-Liersesteenweg and was closed in 1939. In 2008, the station was reopened for regular use.

== Train services ==
The station is served by the following services:

- Brussels RER services (S1) Antwerp - Mechelen - Brussels - Waterloo - Nivelles (weekdays)

Preceding station	NMBS/SNCB	Following station
Mortsel towards Antwerpen-Centraal	S 1 weekdays	Hove towards Nivelles
