= Mortsel railway station =

Railway station in Antwerp, Belgium

Mortsel
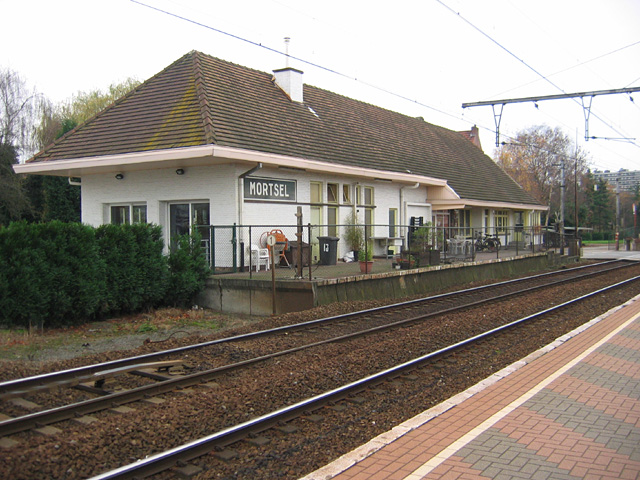

General information
- Location: Mortsel, Antwerp, Belgium
- Coordinates: 51°10′59″N 4°26′56″E
- System: Railway Station
- Owner: National Railway Company of Belgium
- Line: 27
- Platforms: 2
- Tracks: 2

History
- Opened: 1895

Services
Preceding station	NMBS/SNCB	Following station
Antwerpen-Berchem towards Antwerpen-Centraal	L 23	Boechout towards Leuven
Antwerpen-Berchem towards Antwerpen-Centraal	L 24	Boechout towards Mol
Antwerpen-Berchem towards Antwerpen-Centraal	S 1	Mortsel-Liersesteenweg towards Nivelles
Location

Mortsel is a railway station in Mortsel, just south of the city of Antwerp, Antwerp, Belgium. The station opened in 1895 on the Line 27. The station Mortsel-Deurnesteenweg is located just 100 m east of this station on the line towards Brussels. It serves Antwerp International Airport.

The former station house is now used as a community centre.

== Train services ==
The station is served by the following services:

- Local services (L-23) Antwerp – Aarschot – Leuven
- Local services (L-24) Antwerp – Herentals – Mol (weekdays)
- Brussels RER services (S1) Antwerp – Mechelen – Brussels – Waterloo – Nivelles (weekdays)

== Bus services ==
Bus services 33, 51, 52 and 53 serve the station, these are operated by De Lijn.
