= Mortsel-Deurnesteenweg railway station =

Railway station in Antwerp, Belgium

Mortsel-Deurnesteenweg
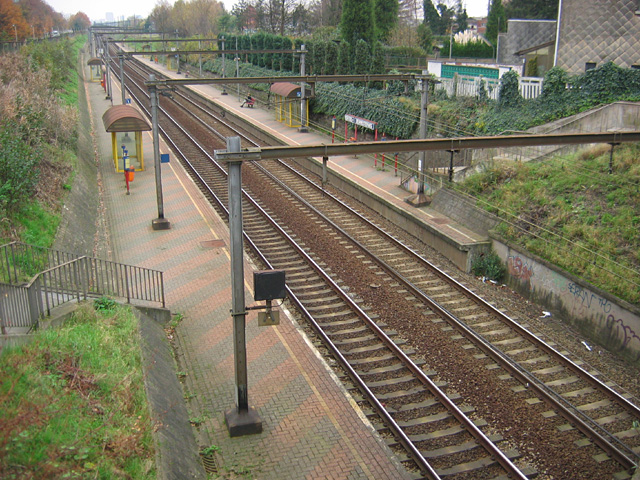

General information
- Location: Mortsel, Antwerp, Belgium
- Coordinates: 51°10′56″N 4°26′49″E
- System: Railway Station
- Owner: National Railway Company of Belgium
- Line: 25
- Platforms: 2
- Tracks: 2

History
- Opened: 31 July 1933

Services
Preceding station	NMBS/SNCB	Following station
Antwerpen-Berchem towards Antwerpen-Centraal	S 1 weekends	Mortsel-Oude-God towards Bruxelles-Midi / Brussel-Zuid
Location

Mortsel-Deurnesteenweg is a railway station in Mortsel, just south of the city of Antwerp, Antwerp, Belgium. The station opened in 1933 on the Line 25. The station Mortsel is located just 100 m east of this station on the line towards Lier. The station is currently only served at weekends and is closed during the week.

== Train services ==
The station is served by the following services:

- Brussels RER services (S1) Antwerp - Mechelen - Brussels (weekends)

== Bus services ==
Bus services 33, 51, 52, and 53 serve the station, these are operated by De Lijn.
