= Weerde railway station =

Railway station in Flemish Brabant, Belgium

Weerde
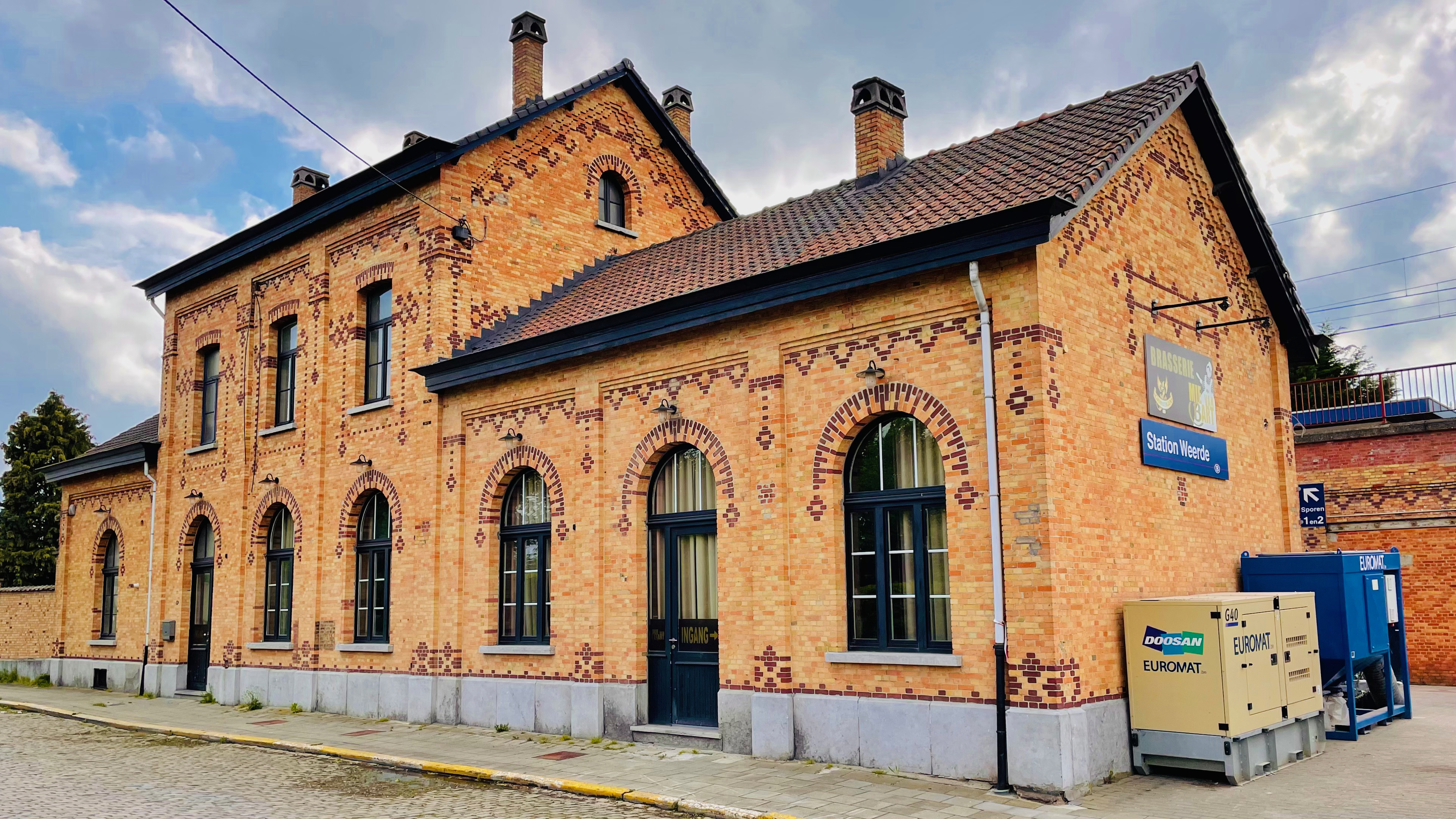
- Weerde railway station

General information
- Location: Belgium
- Coordinates: 50.5840°N 4.2817°E
- System: Railway Station
- Owner: Infrabel
- Operator: National Railway Company of Belgium
- Lines: 25, 27
- Platforms: 4
- Tracks: 4

Other information
- Station code: FWE

History
- Opened: 1 January 1864

Passengers
- 2009: 472
Location

Weerde is a railway station in the town of Weerde, Flemish Brabant, Belgium. The station opened on 1 January 1864 on the Lines 25 and 27. The train services are operated by National Railway Company of Belgium (NMBS).

== Train services ==
The station is served by the following services:

- Brussels RER services (S1) Antwerp – Mechelen – Brussels – Waterloo – Nivelles (weekdays)
- Brussels RER services (S1) Antwerp – Mechelen – Brussels (weekends)
- Brussels RER services (S5) Mechelen – Brussels-Luxembourg – Etterbeek – Halle – Enghien (- Geraardsbergen)

Preceding station	NMBS/SNCB	Following station
Mechelen towards Antwerpen-Centraal	S 1 weekdays	Eppegem towards Nivelles
Mechelen towards Antwerpen-Centraal	S 1 weekends	Eppegem towards Bruxelles-Midi / Brussel-Zuid
Mechelen Terminus	S 5	Eppegem towards Enghien

== See also ==
- List of railway stations in Belgium
