= Ceinture 4001 to 4005 =

French class of locomotive

Ceinture 4001 – 4005 Nord 4.001 – 4.005 SNCF 2-240.TA.1 – 2-240.TA.5
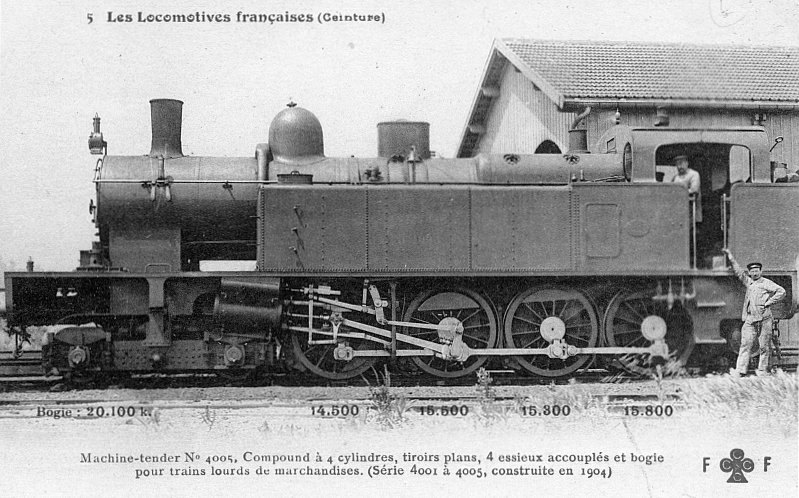
- Ceinture 4005, later Nord 4.005 and SNCF 240.TA.5
Type and origin
- Power type: Steam
- Designer: CF de l'Est
- Builder: SACM-Belfort
- Serial number: 5417–5421
- Build date: 1904
- Total produced: 5
Specifications
- Configuration
  - Whyte: 4-8-0T
  - UIC: 2′D n4vt
- Gauge: 1,435 mm (4 ft 8 1/2 in)
- Driver dia.: 1,440 mm (4 ft 8 3/4 in)
- Axle load
  - Leading: 20.10 tonnes (19.78 long tons; 22.16 short tons)
  - 1st coupled: 14.50 tonnes (14.27 long tons; 15.98 short tons)
  - 2nd coupled: 15.50 tonnes (15.26 long tons; 17.09 short tons)
  - 3rd coupled: 15.30 tonnes (15.06 long tons; 16.87 short tons)
  - 4th coupled: 15.80 tonnes (15.55 long tons; 17.42 short tons)
- Loco weight: 81.20 tonnes (79.92 long tons; 89.51 short tons)
- Firebox
  - Type: Belpaire
  - Grate area: 2.27 m^{2} (24.4 sq ft)
- Boiler pressure: 15 kgf/cm^{2} (1.47 MPa; 213 psi)
- Heating surface: 203.0 m^{2} (2,185 sq ft)
- Cylinders: 4, compound: high pressure outside, low pressure inside
- High-pressure cylinder: 370 mm × 650 mm (14 9/16 in × 25 9/16 in)
- Low-pressure cylinder: 570 mm × 650 mm (22 7/16 in × 25 9/16 in)
- Valve type: Slide valves
Career
- Operators: Ceinture; Nord; SNCF
- Numbers: Ceinture 4001–4005; Nord 4.001 – 4.005; SNCF 2-240.TA.1 – 2-240.TA.5
- Retired: 1944–1948
- Disposition: All scrapped

Ceinture 4001 to 4005, was a class of five 4-8-0T tank locomotives designed by the Chemins de fer de l'Ouest for the Syndicat d'Exploitation des Chemins de fer de Ceinture de Paris.

They were built by Société Alsacienne de Constructions Mécaniques (SACM) at their Belfort Works in 1904

In 1934 they passed to the Chemins de fer du Nord, who renumbered them Nord 4.001 to 4.005.

In 1938 at the formation of the SNCF, they became 240.TA.1 to 240.TA.5.

One locomotive, 240.TA.2 was destroyed in World War II and written-off the books in September 1944. The remaining four locomotives continued in service until they were all retired in September 1948. None were preserved.

== See also ==
- List of Chemins de Fer du Nord locomotives
