= Mortsel-Oude-God railway station =

Railway station in Antwerp, Belgium

Mortsel-Oude-God
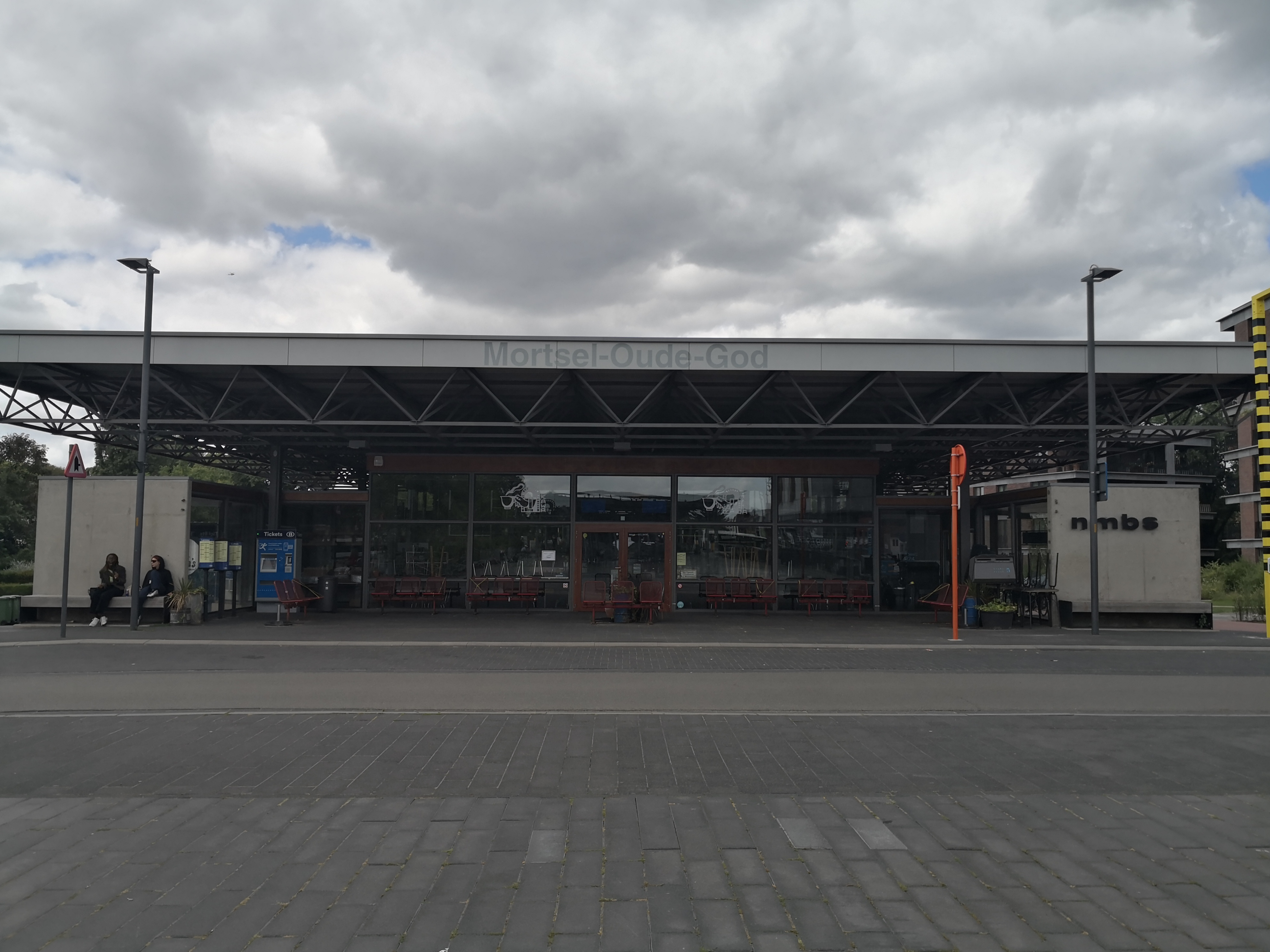
- Mortsel-Oude-God railway station

General information
- Location: Mortsel, Antwerp, Belgium
- Coordinates: 51°10′15″N 4°27′22″E
- System: Railway Station
- Owner: National Railway Company of Belgium
- Line: 25
- Platforms: 2
- Tracks: 2

History
- Opened: 16 June 1836
Location

Mortsel-Oude-God is a railway station in Mortsel, just south of the city of Antwerp, Antwerp, Belgium. The station opened in 1836 on the Line 25. The station is partly in a tunnel, under a car park and road.

Originally the station was unplanned and the name was first given to the current Mortsel Liersesteenweg station, located on line 27. However, due to complaints by shop owners and inhabitants of the nearby Statielei, the NMBS built a new station on line 25 that received the name Oude God and the original station was renamed.

The current station building is a 1974 design from Dirk Servaes and Johan Beyne.

== Train services ==
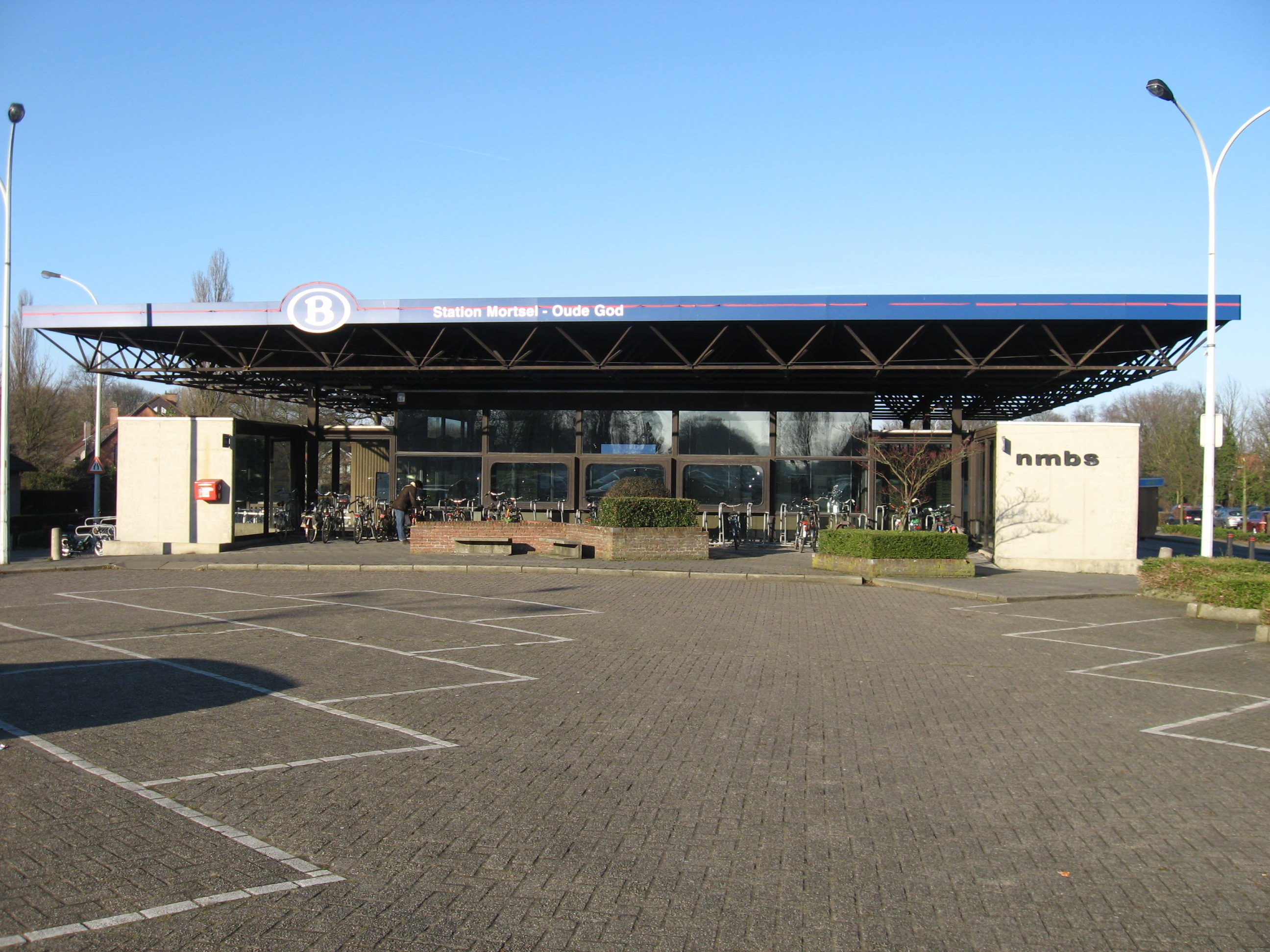
Station Mortsel-Oude-God in 2009

The station is served by the following services:

- Intercity services (IC-22) Essen - Antwerp - Mechelen - Brussels (weekdays)
- Intercity services (IC-22) Antwerp - Mechelen - Brussels - Halle - Braine-le-Comte - Binche (weekends)
- Intercity services (IC-31) Antwerp - Mechelen - Brussels (weekdays)
- Intercity services (IC-31) Antwerp - Mechelen - Brussels - Nivelles - Charleroi (weekends)
- Brussels RER services (S1) Antwerp - Mechelen - Brussels (weekends)

Preceding station	NMBS/SNCB	Following station
Antwerpen-Berchem towards Essen	IC 22 weekdays, except holidays	Mechelen-Nekkerspoel towards Bruxelles-Midi / Brussel-Zuid
Antwerpen-Berchem towards Antwerpen-Centraal	IC 22 weekends	Mechelen-Nekkerspoel towards Binche
Antwerpen-Berchem towards Antwerpen-Centraal	IC 31 weekdays, except holidays	Mechelen-Nekkerspoel towards Bruxelles-Midi / Brussel-Zuid
Antwerpen-Berchem towards Antwerpen-Centraal	IC 31 weekends	Mechelen-Nekkerspoel towards Charleroi-Sud
Mortsel-Deurnesteenweg towards Antwerpen-Centraal	S 1 weekends	Hove towards Bruxelles-Midi / Brussel-Zuid

== Tram service ==
Tram service 15 serves the station, it is operated by De Lijn.

== Bus services ==
Bus services 90 and 141 serve the station, these are operated by De Lijn.
