= Eppegem railway station =

Railway station in Flemish Brabant, Belgium

Eppegem
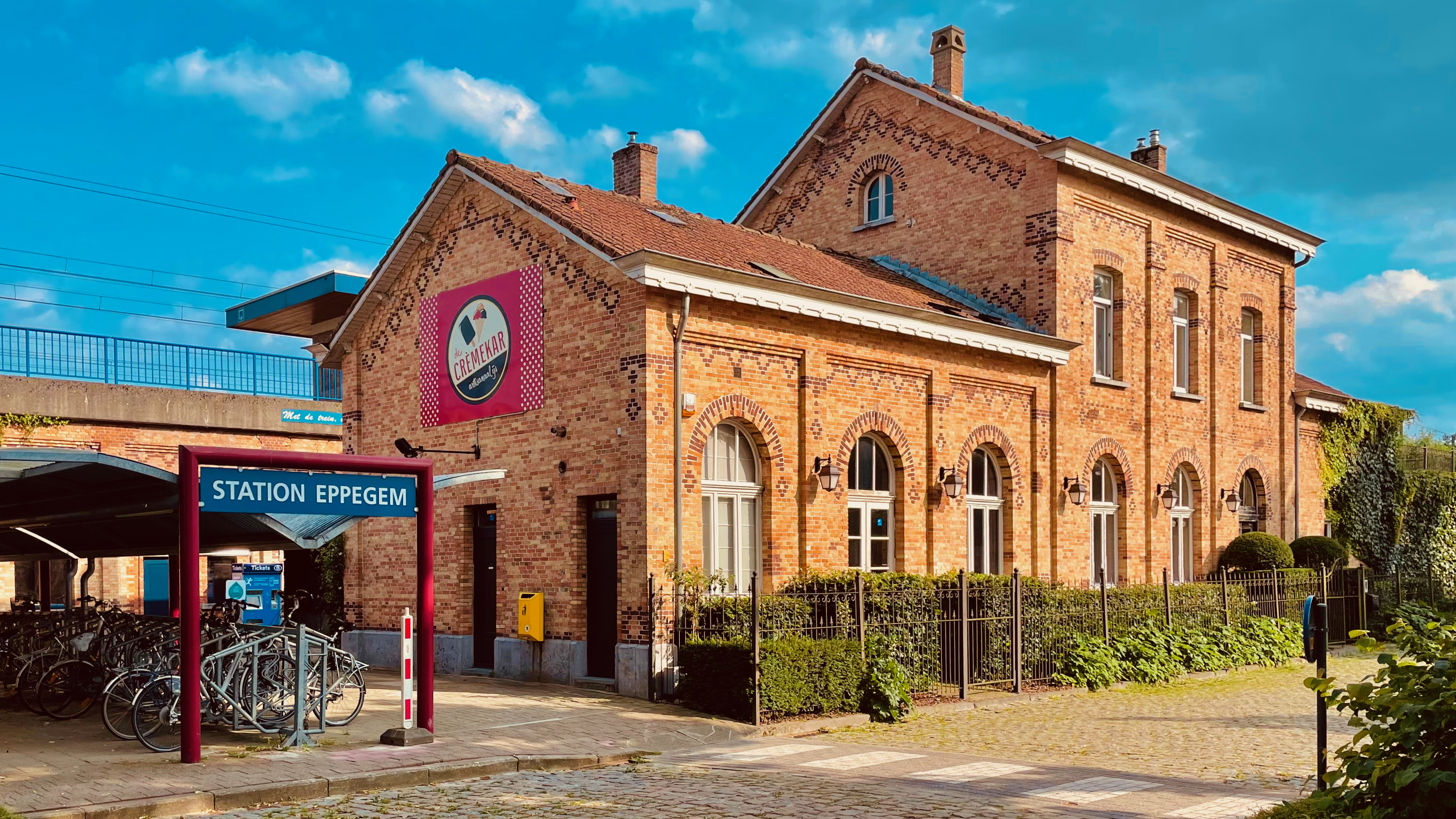
- Eppegem railway station

General information
- Location: Belgium
- Coordinates: 50.5731°N 4.2727°E
- System: Railway Station
- Owner: Infrabel
- Operator: National Railway Company of Belgium
- Lines: 25, 27
- Platforms: 4
- Tracks: 4

Other information
- Station code: FPH

History
- Opened: 1 March 1865

Passengers
- 2009: 448
Location

Eppegem is a railway station in the town of Eppegem, Flemish Brabant, Belgium. The station opened on 1 March 1865 on the Lines 25 and 27. The train services are operated by National Railway Company of Belgium (NMBS).

== Train services ==
The station is served by the following services:

- Brussels RER services (S1) Antwerp - Mechelen - Brussels - Waterloo - Nivelles (weekdays)
- Brussels RER services (S1) Antwerp - Mechelen - Brussels (weekends)
- Brussels RER services (S5) Mechelen - Brussels-Luxembourg - Etterbeek - Halle - Enghien (- Geraardsbergen)
- Brussels RER services (S7) Mechelen - Merode - Halle

Preceding station	NMBS/SNCB	Following station
Weerde towards Antwerpen-Centraal	S 1 weekdays	Vilvoorde towards Nivelles
Weerde towards Antwerpen-Centraal	S 1 weekends	Vilvoorde towards Bruxelles-Midi / Brussel-Zuid
Weerde towards Mechelen	S 5	Vilvoorde towards Enghien
Hofstade towards Vilvoorde	S 7	Vilvoorde towards Halle

== See also ==
- List of railway stations in Belgium
