= Kontich-Lint railway station =

Railway station in Antwerp, Belgium

Kontich-Lint
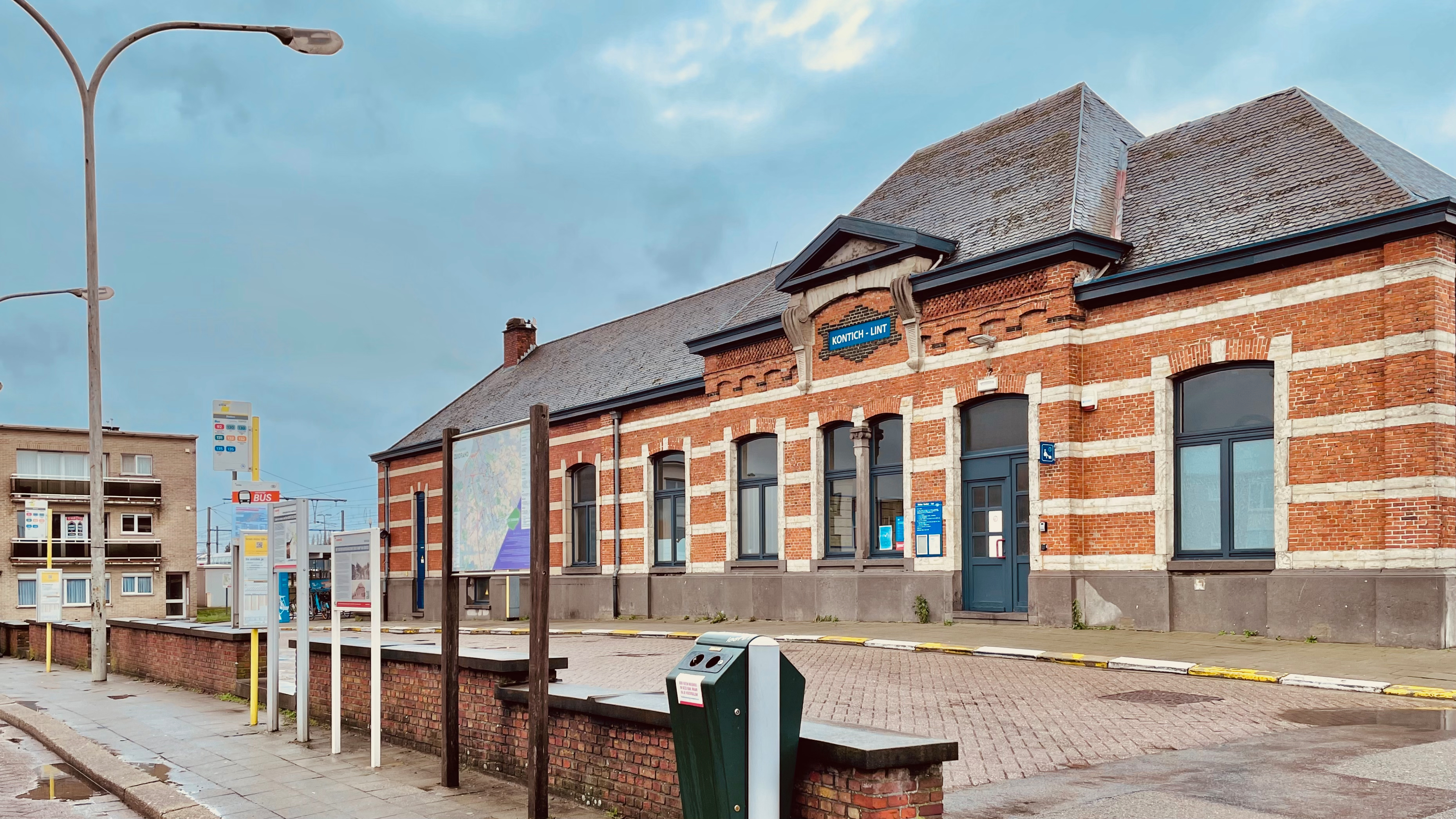
- Kontich-Lint railway station

General information
- Location: Kontich, Antwerp, Antwerp, Belgium
- Coordinates: 51°08′01″N 4°28′38″E
- System: Railway Station
- Owner: National Railway Company of Belgium
- Lines: 13, 25, 27
- Platforms: 5
- Tracks: 5

History
- Opened: 3 May 1836
Location

Kontich-Lint is a railway station in the town of Kontich, Antwerp, Belgium. The station opened on 2 May 1836 on lines 13, 25, and 27. The train services are operated by National Railway Company of Belgium (NMBS).

== Train services ==
The station is served by the following services:

- Brussels RER services (S1) Antwerp - Mechelen - Brussels - Waterloo - Nivelles (weekdays)
- Brussels RER services (S1) Antwerp - Mechelen - Brussels (weekends)

Preceding station	NMBS/SNCB	Following station
Hove towards Antwerpen-Centraal	S 1 weekdays	Duffel towards Nivelles
Hove towards Antwerpen-Centraal	S 1 weekends	Duffel towards Bruxelles-Midi / Brussel-Zuid
