= Clem Schouwenaars =

Belgian writer (1932–1993)

- Born: 28 December 1932; Mortsel, Belgium
- Died: 10 September 1993 (aged 60); Lubbeek, Belgium
- Occupations: poet, writer

Clem Schouwenaars (28 December 1932 – 10 September 1993) was a Belgian writer. He grew up in a Roman Catholic family. Two of his brothers and one of his sisters died young, and his only remaining sister was killed during a bombardment in 1943. His mother died in 1960, and some time later his father committed suicide.

After high school he attended the Vrije Universiteit Brussel but did not finish and became a journalist and a teacher. Finally, he became a full-time writer. He spent most of his life in the countryside of Flanders. With his first wife, Hélène Maes, he had 2 daughters: Marleen and Anneke. Together with his second wife, Rotraut Kerzinger, he had two children: Jessica and Thomas.

He made his debut as a writer with romantic poetry in 1959 with Het woud van licht en lommer (E: The forest of light and shadow). His first novel, Jij, een meermin? (E: You, a mermaid?), is characterized by personal considerations and thoughts, and he is considered to be an autobiographical author, inspired by personal experiences.

== Bibliography ==
- Het woud van licht en lommer (poetry, 1955)
- Albasten amforen (poetry, 1956)
- Onvoltooide executie (poetry, 1958)
- Jij, een meermin? (prose, 1959)
- De vrouwelijke verzen (poetry, 1960)
- Dokter Simon Falbeck (prose, 1962)
- De schaduwdrager (poetry, 1963)
- Etudes voor de rechterhand (poetry, 1964)
- De zeven nachten (prose, 1974)
- De lente van Jonathan (theatre, 1965)
- Beminnen (prose, 1966)
- Eluard lezen (theatre, 1966)
- Eten met Evert (theatre, 1966)
- Frescobaldi sonnetten (poetry, 1966)
- De man van mos (prose, 1966)
- Ergens in Europa (theatre, 1967)
- Kamers voor reizigers (prose, 1968)
- Tweemaal leven (prose, 1968)
- Een nacht op Elba (prose, 1969)
- Witte wolken, groene wolken (theatre, 1969)
- Leda of het herleven (poetry, 1970)
- Een krans om de maan (prose, 1971)
- Doods domeinen (poetry, 1972)
- De boer van Tienen (prose, 1972) (in Elfstedentocht door Antwerpen)
- Gedichten 1956-1970. Een ring van granaat (poetry, 1972)
- De seizoenen (prose, 1972)
- Een zachte Saraceen (poetry, 1972)
- Antichambre (prose, 1973)
- Oog in oog (prose, 1973)
- Uit het gareel (prose, 1973)
- Schaduw der dwaling (poetry, 1974)
- Echtelieden (theatre, 1974)
- Jongste gedichten (poetry, 1974)
- Baldriaan of de vertelling van zijn geboorte zoals hij ze de schrijver heeft gedaan (prose, 1975)
- Bezoek aan de dodengang (prose, 1975)
- Het gezicht in de ruit (poetry, 1975)
- Rotraut (poetry, 1975)
- Cantica mea (poetry, 1976)
- Cresus of hoe ik rijk en volksgeliefd werd (prose, 1976)
- De leden van de jury (prose, 1977)
- De stervende Gallier (prose, 1977)
- Ijzertijd (poetry, 1978)
- Bougainvillea (prose, 1979)
- De werken van barmhartigheid (prose, 1979)
- Winter in Reninge (poetry, 1979)
- Middernacht en meer (prose, 1979)
- De vogelspin en andere verhalen (prose, 1979) (comprising : De mieren, De vogelspin, Danny)
- Winters verweer (prose, 1980)
- Een morgen in de Moeren (prose, 1980)
- Het waanbeeld (prose, 1980)
- Jij, een meermin? en andere verhalen (prose, 1981) (comprising : Jij een meermin?, Het hok, De man van mos, De bruilof van Kana, De mieren, De vogelspin, Gesprek met mijn dieren, Hittegolf, Françoise of de dood der nimfen, Antichambre, Rabbe, De papieren school, Een zomerdag, Danny)
- Emilie Beyns : Verwanten (prose, 1981)
- Emilie Beyns : Meeldauw (prose, 1981)
- Emile Beyns : De vrouwen (prose, 1982)
- Emilie Beyns : De glimlach (prose, 1982)
- Gras (prose, 1982)
- Naschrift voor Jessica (prose, 1983)
- Liliane of De spiegelingen van leugen en liefde (prose, 1983)
- Ars moriendi (prose + poetry, 1984)
- Verzamelde gedichten (poetry, 1984)
- Rosenkranz (prose, 1985)
- Liefdeshalve (pöezie, 1985)
- De slag van Tulperosa (kinderverhaal, 1985)
- Prometheus (prose, 1986)
- De reiziger, een najaarsrapsodie (prose, 1986)
- Eurydike (poetry, 1987)
- Beminnen (prose, 1987)
- Oktober / Han Poorter (prose, 1988)
- Oktober / Maud Folcke (prose, 1989)
- Verdagen (poetry, 1989)
- Afscheid van Fonteyne (prose, 1989)
- La comtesse de Sallac (prose, 1989)
- Een dageraad (prose, 1989)
- Relazen (prose, 1989) (omvattend: Antichambre, Bezoek aan de dodengang, Cresus)
- Oberon. "In memoriam Jos Schouwenaars, mijn vader" (prose, 1990)
- De drie Gratiën (prose, 1991)
- Het huis op de heuvel (bundel, 1991)
- Het manuscript van Villabrune (prose, 1991)
- Hagepreken (bundel, 1992)
- Het Loofhuttenfeest (prose, 1993)
- Balladen (unpublished legacy, poetry, 2000)
- De slag van Tulparosa (sprookje, 2002)

== See also ==
- Flemish literature

== Sources ==
- Clem Schouwenaars (in Dutch)
- Clem Schouwenaars (in Dutch)
