= Mechelen-Nekkerspoel railway station =

Railway station in Antwerp, Belgium

Mechelen-Nekkerspoel
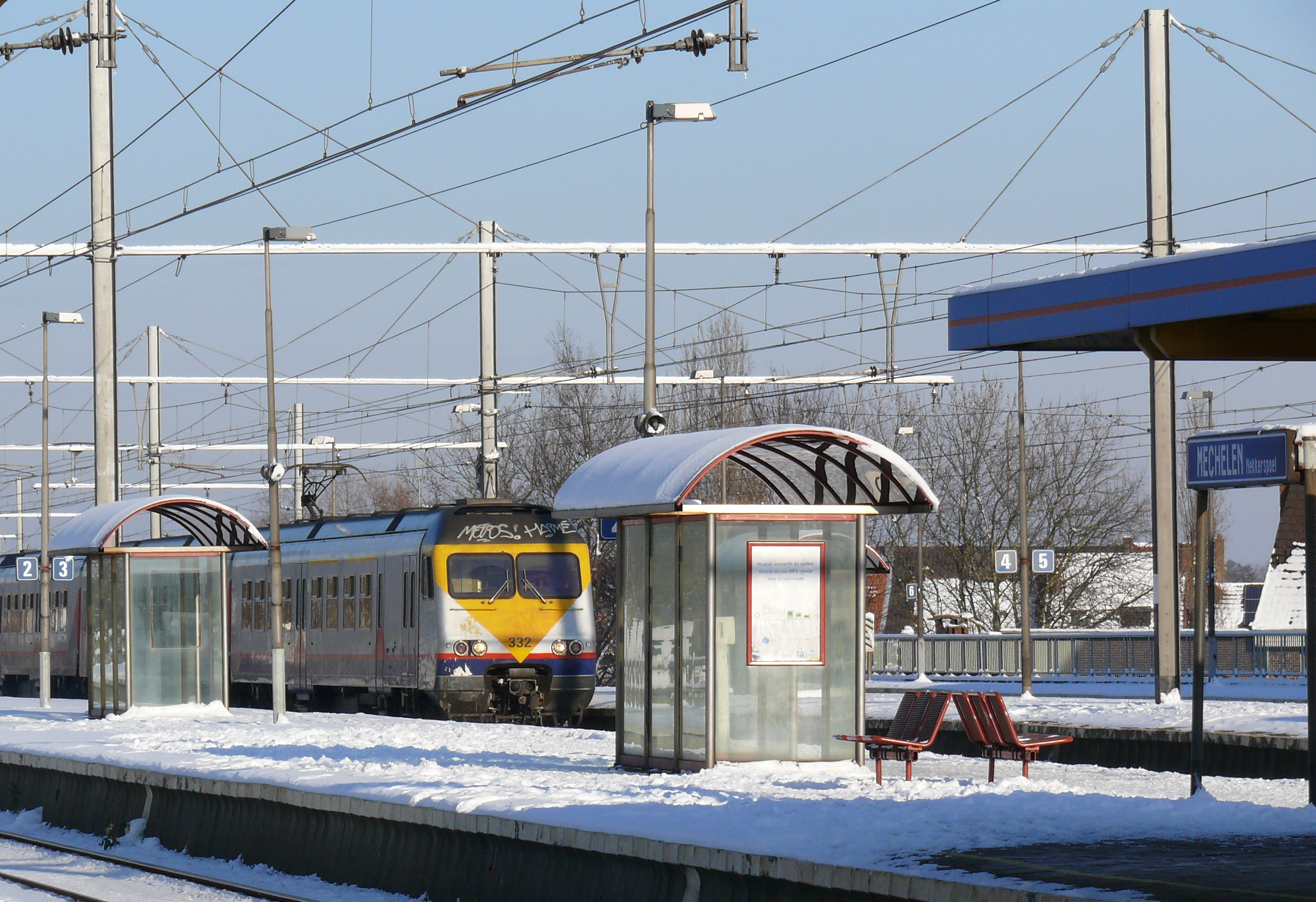
- Mechelen-Nekkerspoel railway station

General information
- Location: Mechelen, Antwerp; Belgium
- Coordinates: 51°01′48″N 4°29′25″E
- System: Railway Station
- Owner: NMBS/SNCB
- Operator: NMBS/SNCB
- Lines: 25, 27 & 27B
- Platforms: 6
- Tracks: 6

History
- Opened: 3 December 1903; 122 years ago
Location
- Location within Belgium Location within Europe

Mechelen-Nekkerspoel railway station (Dutch: Station Mechelen-Nekkerspoel; French: Gare de Malines-Nekkerspoel) (Note: Officially Mechelen-Nekkerspoel (Dutch: Mechelen-Nekkerspoel; French: Malines-Nekkerspoel)) is a railway station in Mechelen, Antwerp, Belgium. The station opened on 3 December 1903 on railway lines 25, 27 and 27B. The train services are operated by the National Railway Company of Belgium (NMBS/SNCB).

== Train services ==
The station is served by the following services:

- Intercity services (IC-22) Essen - Antwerp - Mechelen - Brussels (weekdays)
- Intercity services (IC-22) Antwerp - Mechelen - Brussels - Halle - Braine-le-Comte - Binche (weekends)
- Intercity services (IC-31) Antwerp - Mechelen - Brussels (weekdays)
- Intercity services (IC-31) Antwerp - Mechelen - Brussels - Nivelles - Charleroi (weekends)
- Brussels RER services (S1) Antwerp - Mechelen - Brussels - Waterloo - Nivelles (weekdays)
- Brussels RER services (S1) Antwerp - Mechelen - Brussels (weekends)

Preceding station	NMBS/SNCB	Following station
Mortsel-Oude-God towards Essen	IC 22 weekdays, except holidays	Mechelen towards Bruxelles-Midi / Brussel-Zuid
Mortsel-Oude-God towards Antwerpen-Centraal	IC 22 weekends	Mechelen towards Binche
Mortsel-Oude-God towards Antwerpen-Centraal	IC 31 weekdays, except holidays	Mechelen towards Bruxelles-Midi / Brussel-Zuid
Mortsel-Oude-God towards Antwerpen-Centraal	IC 31 weekends	Mechelen towards Charleroi-Sud
Sint-Katelijne-Waver towards Antwerpen-Centraal	S 1 weekdays	Mechelen towards Nivelles
Sint-Katelijne-Waver towards Antwerpen-Centraal	S 1 weekends	Mechelen towards Bruxelles-Midi / Brussel-Zuid

== See also ==
- List of railway stations in Belgium
- Rail transport in Belgium
