= Sint-Katelijne-Waver railway station =

Railway station in Antwerp, Belgium

Sint-Katelijne-Waver
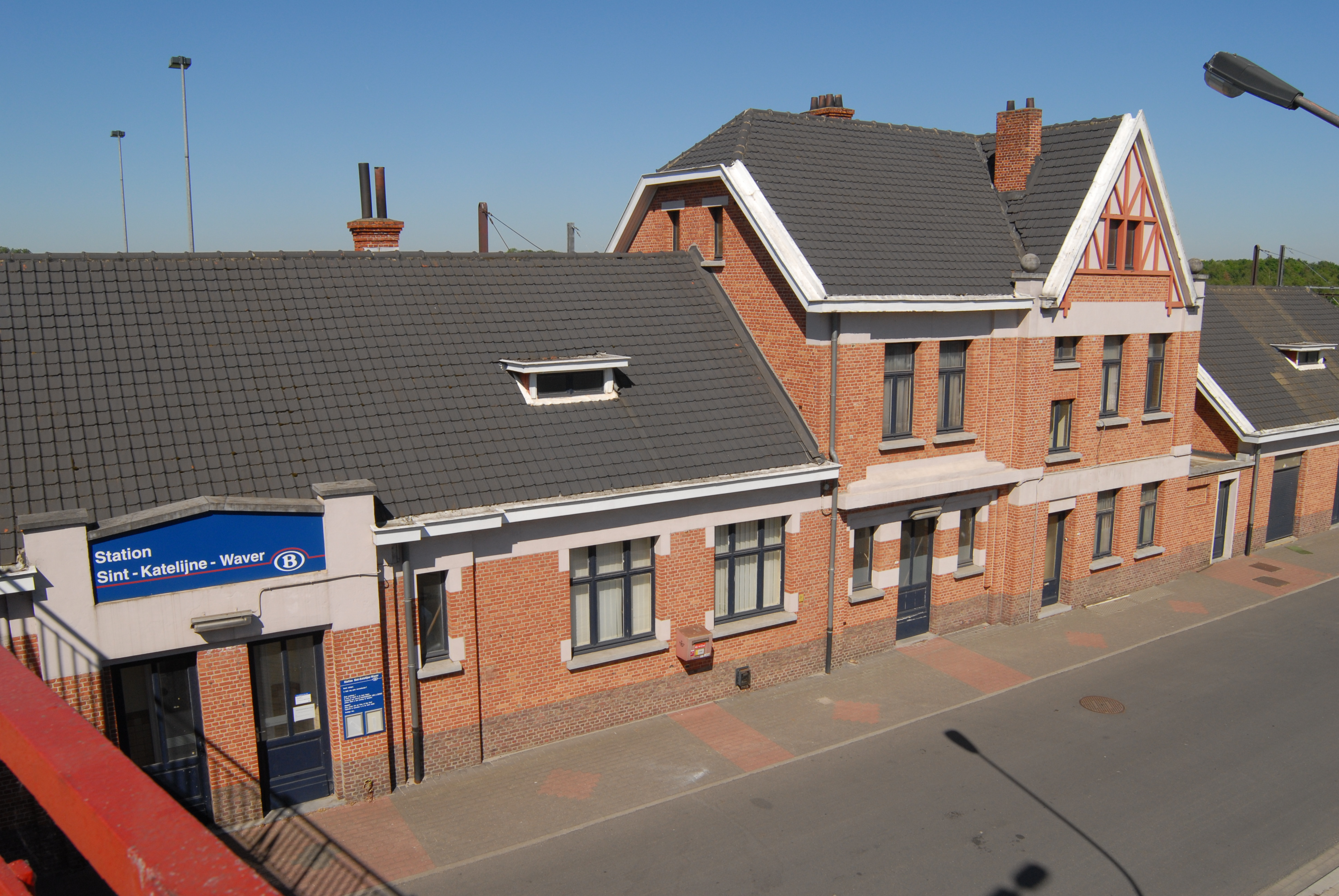

General information
- Location: Sint-Katelijne-Waver, Antwerp, Antwerp, Belgium
- Coordinates: 51°04′12″N 4°29′47″E
- System: Railway Station
- Owner: National Railway Company of Belgium
- Lines: 25, 27
- Platforms: 4
- Tracks: 4

History
- Opened: 1 June 1865

Services
Preceding station	NMBS/SNCB	Following station
Duffel towards Antwerpen-Centraal	S 1 weekdays	Mechelen-Nekkerspoel towards Nivelles
Duffel towards Antwerpen-Centraal	S 1 weekends	Mechelen-Nekkerspoel towards Bruxelles-Midi / Brussel-Zuid
Location

Sint-Katelijne-Waver is a railway station in the town of Sint-Katelijne-Waver, Antwerp, Belgium. The station opened on 1 June 1865 on the Lines 25 and 27. The train services are operated by National Railway Company of Belgium (NMBS).

== Train services ==
The station is served by the following services:

- Brussels RER services (S1) Antwerp - Mechelen - Brussels - Waterloo - Nivelles (weekdays)
- Brussels RER services (S1) Antwerp - Mechelen - Brussels (weekends)
