= Antwerpen-Berchem railway station =

Railway station in Antwerp, Belgium

Antwerpen-Berchem
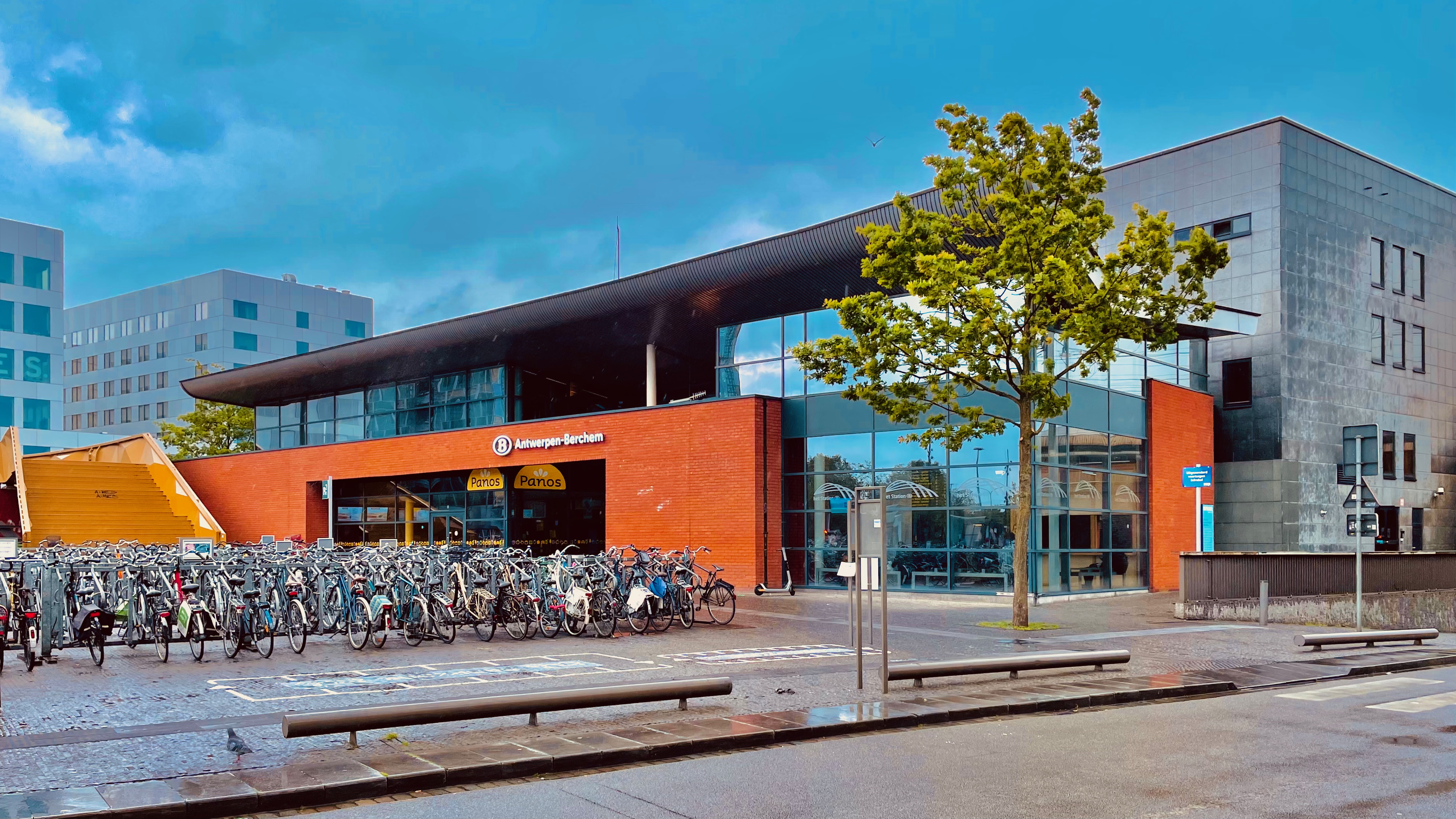
- Antwerpen-Berchem railway station

General information
- Location: Berchem, Antwerp, Belgium
- Coordinates: 51°11′57″N 4°25′59″E
- System: Railway Station
- Owner: NMBS/SNCB
- Operator: NMBS/SNCB
- Lines: 25, 27, 27A, 59
- Platforms: 10
- Tracks: 10

History
- Opened: 1 March 1865; 161 years ago
Location
- Location within Belgium Location within Europe

Antwerpen-Berchem railway station (Dutch: Station Antwerpen-Berchem; French: Gare d'Anvers-Berchem) (Note: Officially Antwerpen-Berchem (Dutch: Antwerpen-Berchem; French: Anvers-Berchem)) is a railway station in Berchem, in the south of Antwerp, Belgium. The station opened on 1 March 1865 and currently serves railway lines 25, 27, 27A and 59. The train services are operated by the National Railway Company of Belgium (NMBS/SNCB).

== History ==
From opening until 1975, the station was simply known as Berchem, later changing to Berchem (Antwerpen), at a time that international trains stopped here instead of Antwerpen Oost. In 1983, when Berchem and Antwerp became one city, the station was renamed Antwerpen-Berchem.

International Thalys and Benelux services (from Amsterdam to Brussels and Paris) stopped calling at this station, following the opening of the North-South tunnel under Antwerpen-Centraal. Since December 2014, the Benelux service (Amsterdam–Brussels) calls at the station again.

== Train services ==
The following services currently the serve the station:

- Intercity services (IC-02) Antwerp - Sint-Niklaas - Gent - Bruges - Ostend
- Intercity services (IC-04) Antwerp - Sint-Niklaas - Gent - Kortrijk - Poperinge/Lille
- Intercity services (IC-05) Antwerp - Mechelen - Brussels - Nivelles - Charleroi (weekdays)
- Intercity services (IC-08) Antwerp - Mechelen - Brussels Airport - Leuven - Hasselt
- Intercity services (IC-09) Antwerp - Lier - Aarschot - Leuven (weekdays)
- Intercity services (IC-09) Antwerp - Lier - Aarschot - Hasselt - Liege (weekends)
- Intercity services (IC-10) Antwerp - Mol - Hamont/Hasselt
- Intercity services (IC-22) Essen - Antwerp - Mechelen - Brussels (weekdays)
- Intercity services (IC-22) Antwerp - Mechelen - Brussels - Binche (weekends)
- Intercity services (IC-28) Antwerp - Sint-Niklaas - Gent (weekdays)
- Intercity services (IC-30) Antwerp - Herentals - Turnhout
- Intercity services (IC-31) Antwerp - Mechelen - Brussels - Nivelles - Charleroi (weekends)
- Intercity services (IC-35) Amsterdam - The Hague - Rotterdam - Roosendaal - Antwerp - Brussels Airport - Brussels
- Local services (L-22) Roosendaal - Essen - Antwerp - Puurs (weekdays)
- Local services (L-23) Antwerp - Aarschot - Leuven
- Local services (L-24) Antwerp - Herentals - Mol (weekdays)
- Local services (L-30) Antwerp - Lokeren
- Brussels RER services (S1) Antwerp - Mechelen - Brussels - Waterloo - Nivelles (weekdays)
- Brussels RER services (S1) Antwerp - Mechelen - Brussels (weekends)

Preceding station	NS International	Following station
Antwerpen-Centraal towards Amsterdam Centraal	Eurocity 9200	Mechelen towards Brussels-South
Preceding station	NMBS/SNCB	Following station
Antwerpen-Centraal Terminus	IC 02	Antwerpen-Zuid towards Oostende
Antwerpen-Centraal Terminus	IC 04	Sint-Niklaas towards Lille-Flandres or Poperinge
Antwerpen-Centraal Terminus	IC 05	Mechelen towards Charleroi-Sud
Antwerpen-Centraal Terminus	IC 05	Mortsel-Oude-God towards Charleroi-Sud
Antwerpen-Centraal Terminus	IC 08	Mechelen towards Hasselt
Antwerpen-Centraal Terminus	IC 09 weekdays, except holidays	Lier towards Leuven
Antwerpen-Centraal Terminus	IC 09 weekends	Lier towards Liège-Guillemins
Antwerpen-Centraal Terminus	IC 10	Lier towards Hamont or Hasselt
Antwerpen-Centraal towards Essen	IC 22 weekdays, except holidays	Mortsel-Oude-God towards Bruxelles-Midi / Brussel-Zuid
Antwerpen-Centraal Terminus	IC 22 weekends	Mortsel-Oude-God towards Binche
Antwerpen-Centraal Terminus	IC 28 weekends	Antwerpen-Zuid towards Gent-Sint-Pieters
Antwerpen-Centraal Terminus	IC 30	Lier towards Turnhout
Antwerpen-Centraal Terminus	IC 31	Mechelen towards Bruxelles-Midi / Brussel-Zuid
Antwerpen-Centraal towards Roosendaal	L 22 weekdays	Antwerpen-Zuid towards Puurs
Antwerpen-Centraal Terminus	L 23	Mortsel towards Leuven
Antwerpen-Centraal Terminus	L 24 weekdays	Mortsel towards Mol
Antwerpen-Centraal Terminus	L 30	Antwerpen-Zuid towards Lokeren
Antwerpen-Centraal Terminus	S 1 weekdays	Mortsel towards Nivelles
Antwerpen-Centraal Terminus	S 1 weekends	Mortsel-Deurnesteenweg towards Bruxelles-Midi / Brussel-Zuid

== Tram services ==
Tram lines 4, 9 and 11 serve the station, these are operated by De Lijn.

== Bus services ==
Bus services 20, 21, 30, 32, 38, 51, 52, 53, 90, 91, 92, 93, 298, 420, 421 and 422 serve the station, these are operated by De Lijn.

== See also ==
- List of railway stations in Belgium
- Rail transport in Belgium
