= 1934 in rail transport =

This article lists events related to rail transport that occurred in 1934.

== Events ==
=== January events ===
- January 10 - In France, the Compagnie du chemin de fer de Paris à Orléans and Chemins de fer du Midi merge to form the Chemins de fer de Paris à Orléans et du Midi, operating lines from Paris towards the south-west, with some P-O lines in southern Brittany passing to the Chemins de fer de l'État.

=== February events ===
- February 12 - The Union Pacific Railroad takes delivery from the Pullman Car Company of the M-10000 streamlined diesel passenger train, later known as the City of Salina.

=== March events ===
- March 13 - Taka Station in Taka-chō, Shōbara, Hiroshima Prefecture, Japan, is opened.

=== April events ===
- April 1
  - Teito Electronic Railway Line, Shibuya Station to Kichijōji Station route officially completed in Tokyo, Japan (as predecessor of the Keio Inokashira Line).
  - Chemin de fer de Petite Ceinture concession in Paris ceases to carry passenger traffic.
- April 9 - The Budd Company completes construction of the Chicago, Burlington and Quincy Railroad's Pioneer Zephyr.
- April 18 - The Chicago, Burlington and Quincy Railroad's Pioneer Zephyr is first christened as the Zephyr at Pennsylvania Railroad's Broad Street station.
- April 21 - Ferrovie dello Stato, Italy, opens Direttissima line throughout from Bologna to Florence (97 km) via Apennine Base Tunnel (18.507 km).
- April 30 - The first S-train line in Copenhagen is opened, from Klampenborg to Frederiksberg.

=== May events ===
- The first Italian E428 electric locomotive is produced.
- May 26 - Chicago, Burlington and Quincy Railroad's Pioneer Zephyr makes its "dawn-to-dusk" nonstop run between Denver, and Chicago.

=== June events ===
- June - The Maine Coast Special begins summer service between Montreal and Kennebunkport, Maine over the Grand Trunk, Maine Central and Boston & Maine railroads.
- June 26 - Matthew S. Sloan becomes president of the Missouri–Kansas–Texas Railroad.
- June 29 - The Southern Railway of England renames the Southern Belle passenger train (between London Victoria station and Brighton) to Brighton Belle.

=== July events ===
- July 15 - The Chicago and North Western Transportation Company and the Chicago, Milwaukee, St. Paul and Pacific Railroad begin 90-minute service on their 85-mile (137 km) routes between Chicago and Milwaukee, a precursor to high-speed service to Minneapolis–Saint Paul.

=== August events ===
- August 15 - Shimotsuke-Hanaoka Station on what has become the JR East Karasuyama Line in Takanezawa, Tochigi, Japan, is opened.
- The first London, Midland and Scottish Railway Class 5 4-6-0 "Black 5" to William Stanier's design is completed by Vulcan Foundry. 842 locomotives of this type are eventually completed, with examples in service until the last day of steam on British Rail.
- The first PRR GG1 electric locomotive is delivered to the Pennsylvania Railroad.

=== September events ===
- September 23 - The Broadway-Rensselaer streetcar line in Albany, New York, operated by United Traction Company, is abandoned.
- September 28 - The Winwick rail crash on the London, Midland and Scottish Railway occurs when a busy signalman lines an express passenger train onto a track occupied by a stationary local train; 12 people die in the collision as three of the train's passenger cars are telescoped.

=== October events ===
- October 12
  - The Association of American Railroads (AAR) is created from the merger of five industry organizations.
  - Nyasaland Railways complete construction of the Lower Zambezi Bridge (3676 m (4021 yds)) on the Central African Railway from Sena in Portuguese Mozambique to Port Herald in the British Protectorate of Nyasaland, giving the latter country through rail connection to the port of Beira.
- October 22 - The M-10001, still in its original 900 horsepower (670 kW) incarnation, sets an as-yet unbroken record from coast to coast of the United States, running from Oakland Pier to Grand Central Station in 57 hours.
- October 25 - Takayama Line, Gifu Station via Takayama Station to Toyama Station route officially completed in Japan; at the same time, the Nagoya to Takayama direct express train service starts.

=== November events ===
- November 11 - Chicago, Burlington and Quincy Railroad inaugurates regular passenger service between Lincoln, Nebraska, and Kansas City, Missouri, using the Pioneer Zephyr trainset.
- November 20 - Shin-Kotoni Station on what becomes JR Hokkaido's Sasshō Line in Kita-ku, Sapporo, Hokkaido, Japan, is opened.
- November 30 - Steam locomotive LNER Class A3 4472 Flying Scotsman becomes the first officially to exceed 100 miles per hour (160.9 km/h) on test in England.

=== December events ===
- December - The only 4-14-4 steam locomotive ever built, AA20-1, is completed in the Soviet Union; it never enters regular service.
- December 1 - Tanna Tunnel officially completed in Shizuoka Prefecture, Japan at the same time, most passenger and freight trains through change route via Atami from Gotenba on the Tokaido Line.
- December 14 - The New York Central Railroad unveils the Commodore Vanderbilt, the first streamliner steam locomotive and the inspiration for one of Lionel's more popular toy locomotives.
- December 26 - The Pullman Car & Manufacturing Co. merges with its subsidiary Standard Steel Car Company to become Pullman-Standard.

=== Unknown date events ===
- Congo–Ocean Railway opened.
- 30th Street Station (originally known as Pennsylvania Station) in Philadelphia is built by the Pennsylvania Railroad.
- The High Line in New York City opened to freight traffic.
- The first 2-6-6-4 steam locomotives in the world are delivered to the Pittsburgh and West Virginia Railroad.
- The San Diego and Arizona Eastern Railway discontinues operation of the railroad's three gasoline-electric units.
- ALCO renames the Brooks Works plant, formerly Brooks Locomotive Works, in Dunkirk, New York, to ALCO Thermal Products Division.

== Deaths ==
=== January deaths ===
- January 3 – Victor Spencer, 1st Viscount Churchill, chairman of Great Western Railway (Great Britain) 1908–1934 (born 1864).

=== September deaths ===
- September 24 – Jule Murat Hannaford, president of Northern Pacific Railway 1913–1920 (born 1850).
