= Hove railway station, Belgium =

Railway station in Antwerp, Belgium

Hove
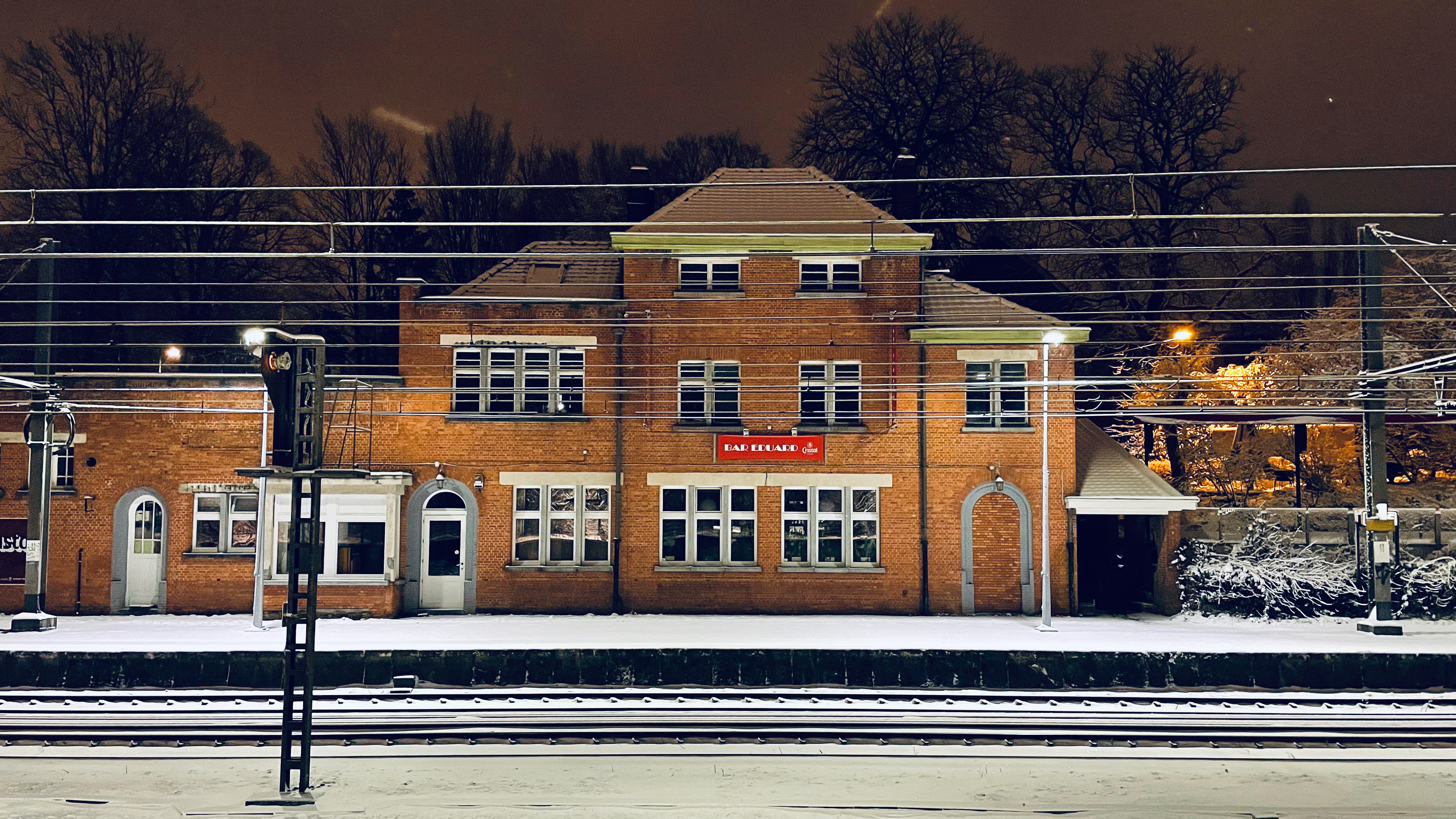
- Hove railway station

General information
- Location: Hove, Antwerp, Belgium
- Coordinates: 51°09′17″N 4°27′55″E
- System: Railway Station
- Owner: National Railway Company of Belgium
- Lines: 25, 27
- Platforms: 4
- Tracks: 4

History
- Opened: 10 August 1888

Services
Preceding station	NMBS/SNCB	Following station
Mortsel-Liersesteenweg towards Antwerpen-Centraal	S 1 weekdays	Kontich-Lint towards Nivelles
Mortsel-Oude-God towards Antwerpen-Centraal	S 1 weekends	Kontich-Lint towards Bruxelles-Midi / Brussel-Zuid
Location

Hove is a railway station in Hove, just south of the city of Antwerp, Antwerp, Belgium. The station opened in 1888 on the Line 25 and Line 27.

== Train services ==
The station is served by the following services:

- Brussels RER services (S1) Antwerp - Mechelen - Brussels - Waterloo - Nivelles (weekdays)
- Brussels RER services (S1) Antwerp - Mechelen - Brussels (weekends)
