= Duffel railway station =

Railway station in Antwerp, Belgium

Duffel
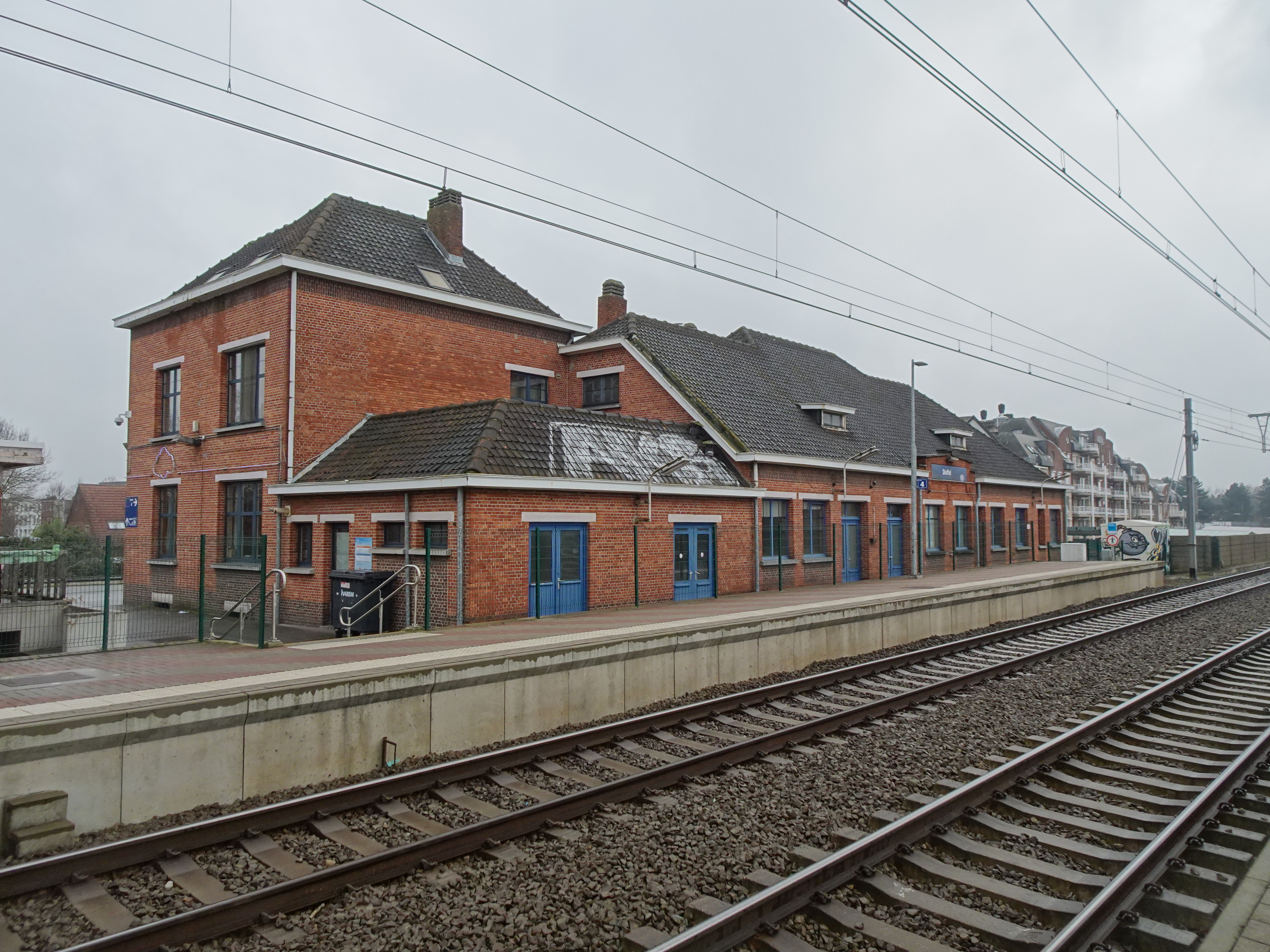
- Duffel railway station

General information
- Location: Duffel, Antwerp, Antwerp, Belgium
- Coordinates: 51°05′30″N 4°29′36″E
- System: Railway Station
- Owner: National Railway Company of Belgium
- Lines: 25, 27
- Platforms: 4
- Tracks: 4

History
- Opened: 16 June 1836

Services
Preceding station	NMBS/SNCB	Following station
Kontich-Lint towards Antwerpen-Centraal	S 1 weekdays	Sint-Katelijne-Waver towards Nivelles
Kontich-Lint towards Antwerpen-Centraal	S 1 weekends	Sint-Katelijne-Waver towards Bruxelles-Midi / Brussel-Zuid
Location

Duffel is a railway station in the town of Duffel, Antwerp, Belgium. The station opened on 16 June 1836 on the Lines 25 and 27. The train services are operated by National Railway Company of Belgium (NMBS).

== Train services ==
The station is served by the following services:

- Brussels RER services (S1) Antwerp - Mechelen - Brussels - Waterloo - Nivelles (weekdays)
- Brussels RER services (S1) Antwerp - Mechelen - Brussels (weekends)
