= Vilvoorde railway station =

Railway station in Flemish Brabant, Belgium

Vilvoorde
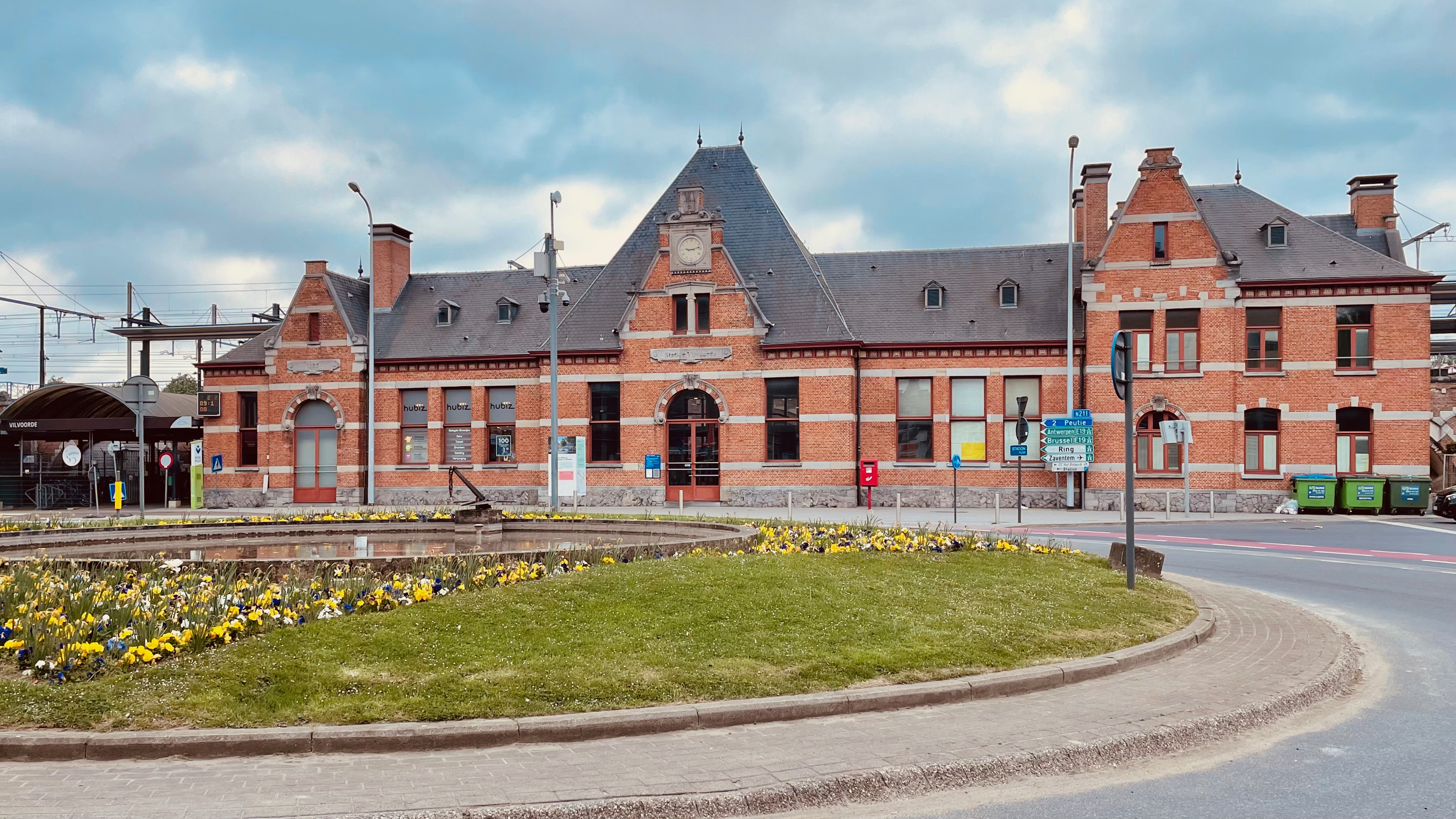
- Vilvoorde railway station

General information
- Location: Vilvoorde, Flemish Brabant; Belgium
- Coordinates: 50°55′27″N 4°29′59″E
- System: Railway Station
- Owner: NMBS/SNCB
- Operator: NMBS/SNCB
- Lines: 25, 27, 26
- Platforms: 6
- Tracks: 9

Other information
- Station code: FVV

History
- Opened: 5 May 1835; 191 years ago
Location
- Location within Belgium Location within Europe

Vilvoorde railway station (Dutch: Station Vilvoorde; French: Gare de Vilvorde) (Note: Officially Vilvoorde (Dutch: Vilvoorde; French: Vilvorde)) is a railway station in Vilvoorde, Flemish Brabant, Belgium. The station opened on 5 May 1835 on the country's first railway, from Brussels to Mechelen; later to become railway lines 25 and 27. The train services are operated by the National Railway Company of Belgium (NMBS/SNCB).

As of 2021, the dilapidated quays and platforms were being renovated, the station building having been renovated a few years before.

== Train services ==
The station is served by the following services:

- Intercity services (IC-11) Binche - Braine-le-Comte - Halle - Brussels - Mechelen - Turnhout (weekdays)
- Intercity services (IC-11) Binche - Braine-le-Comte - Halle - Brussels - Schaarbeek (weekends)
- Intercity services (IC-22) Antwerp - Mechelen - Brussels
- Intercity services (IC-31) Antwerp - Mechelen - Brussels (weekdays)
- Intercity services (IC-31) Antwerp - Mechelen - Brussels - Nivelles - Charleroi (weekends)
- Brussels GEN/RER services (S1) Antwerp - Mechelen - Brussels - Waterloo - Nivelles (weekdays)
- Brussels GEN/RER services (S1) Antwerp - Mechelen - Brussels (weekends)
- Brussels GEN/RER services (S4) Mechelen - Merode - Etterbeek - Brussels-Luxembourg - Denderleeuw - Aalst (weekdays)
- Brussels GEN/RER services (S5) Mechelen - Brussels-Luxembourg - Etterbeek - Halle - Enghien (- Geraardsbergen) (weekdays)
- Brussels GEN/RER services (S5) Mechelen - Brussels-Luxembourg - Etterbeek - Halle (weekends)
- Brussels GEN/RER services (S7) Vilvoorde - Merode - Halle (weekdays)

Preceding station	NMBS/SNCB	Following station
Bruxelles-Nord / Brussel-Noord towards Binche	IC 11	Mechelen towards Turnhout
Mechelen towards Essen	IC 22 weekdays, except holidays	Bruxelles-Nord / Brussel-Noord towards Bruxelles-Midi / Brussel-Zuid
Mechelen towards Antwerpen-Centraal	IC 22 weekends	Bruxelles-Nord / Brussel-Noord towards Binche
Mechelen towards Antwerpen-Centraal	IC 31 weekdays, except holidays	Bruxelles-Nord / Brussel-Noord towards Bruxelles-Midi / Brussel-Zuid
Mechelen towards Antwerpen-Centraal	IC 31 weekends	Bruxelles-Nord / Brussel-Noord towards Charleroi-Sud
Eppegem towards Antwerpen-Centraal	S 1 weekdays	Bruxelles-Nord / Brussel-Noord towards Nivelles
Eppegem towards Antwerpen-Centraal	S 1 weekdays	Buda towards Nivelles
Eppegem towards Antwerpen-Centraal	S 1 weekends	Schaarbeek towards Bruxelles-Midi / Brussel-Zuid
Eppegem towards Mechelen	S 4 weekdays	Haren towards Aalst
Eppegem towards Mechelen	S 5 weekdays	Haren towards Enghien
Terminus	S 7 weekdays	Haren towards Vilvoorde

== See also ==
- List of railway stations in Belgium
- Rail transport in Belgium

== Gallery ==
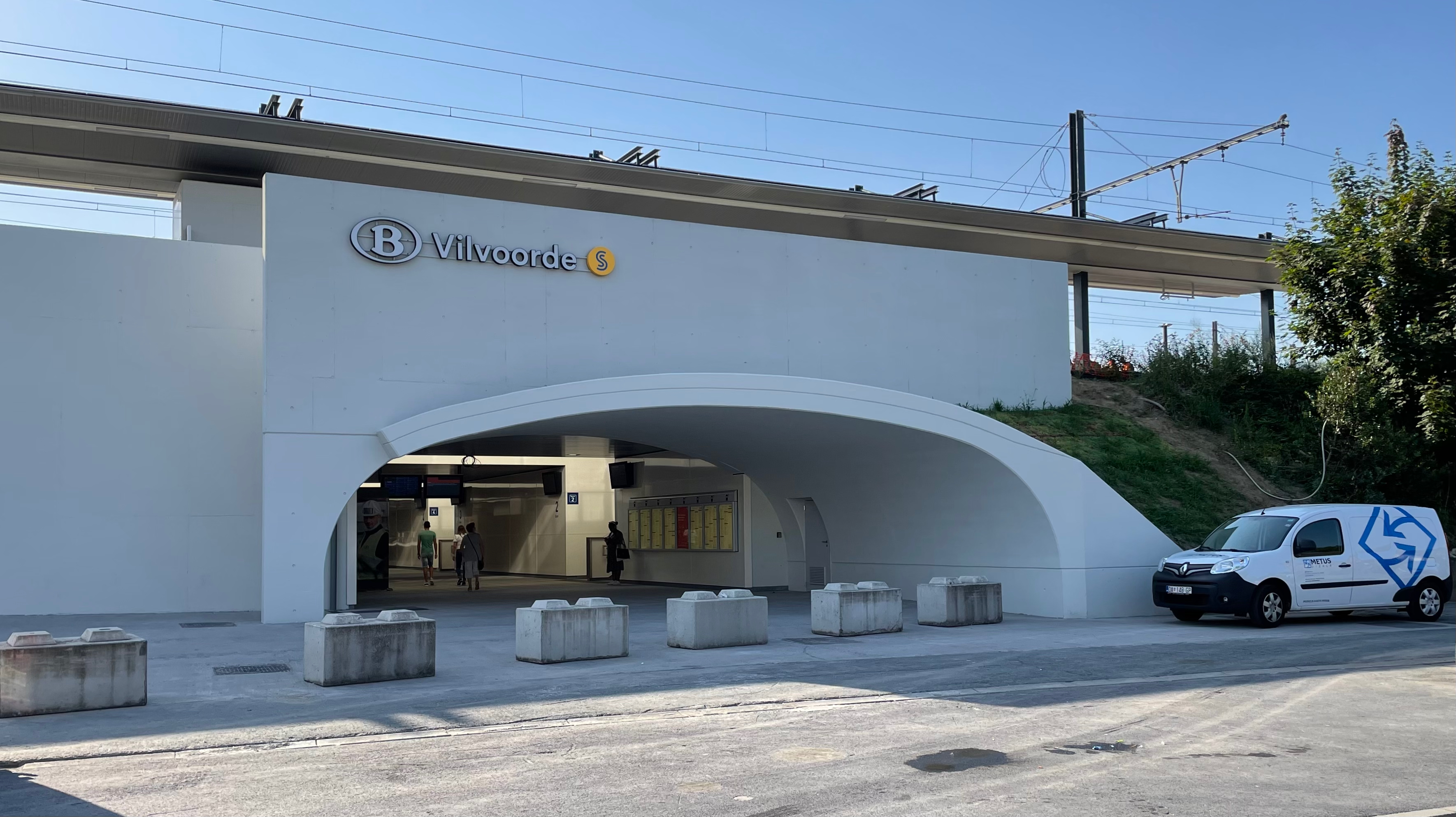
New passage, opened in 2022

Second tunnel, re-opened after renovations in 2026

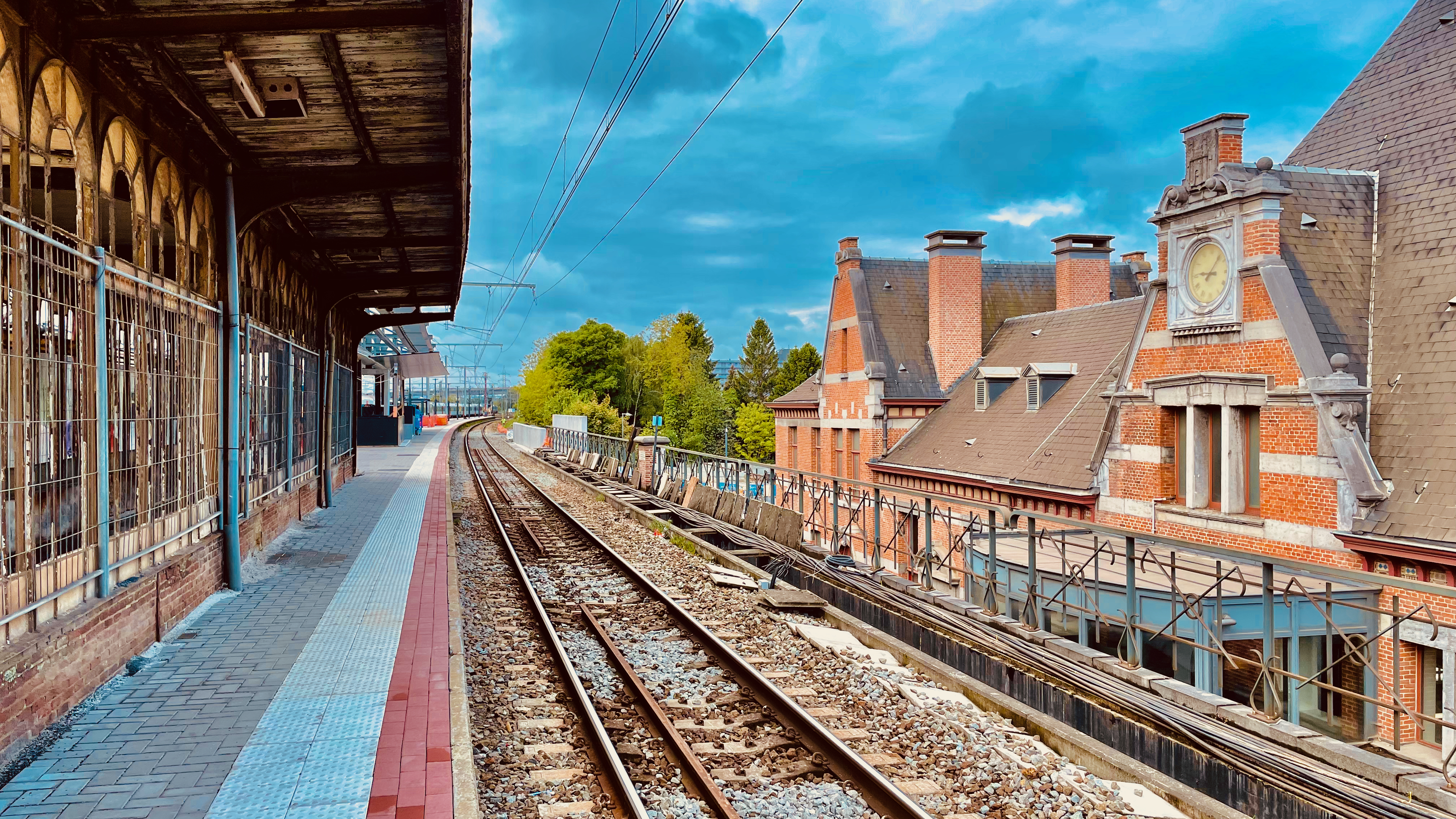
View of the platforms and tracks

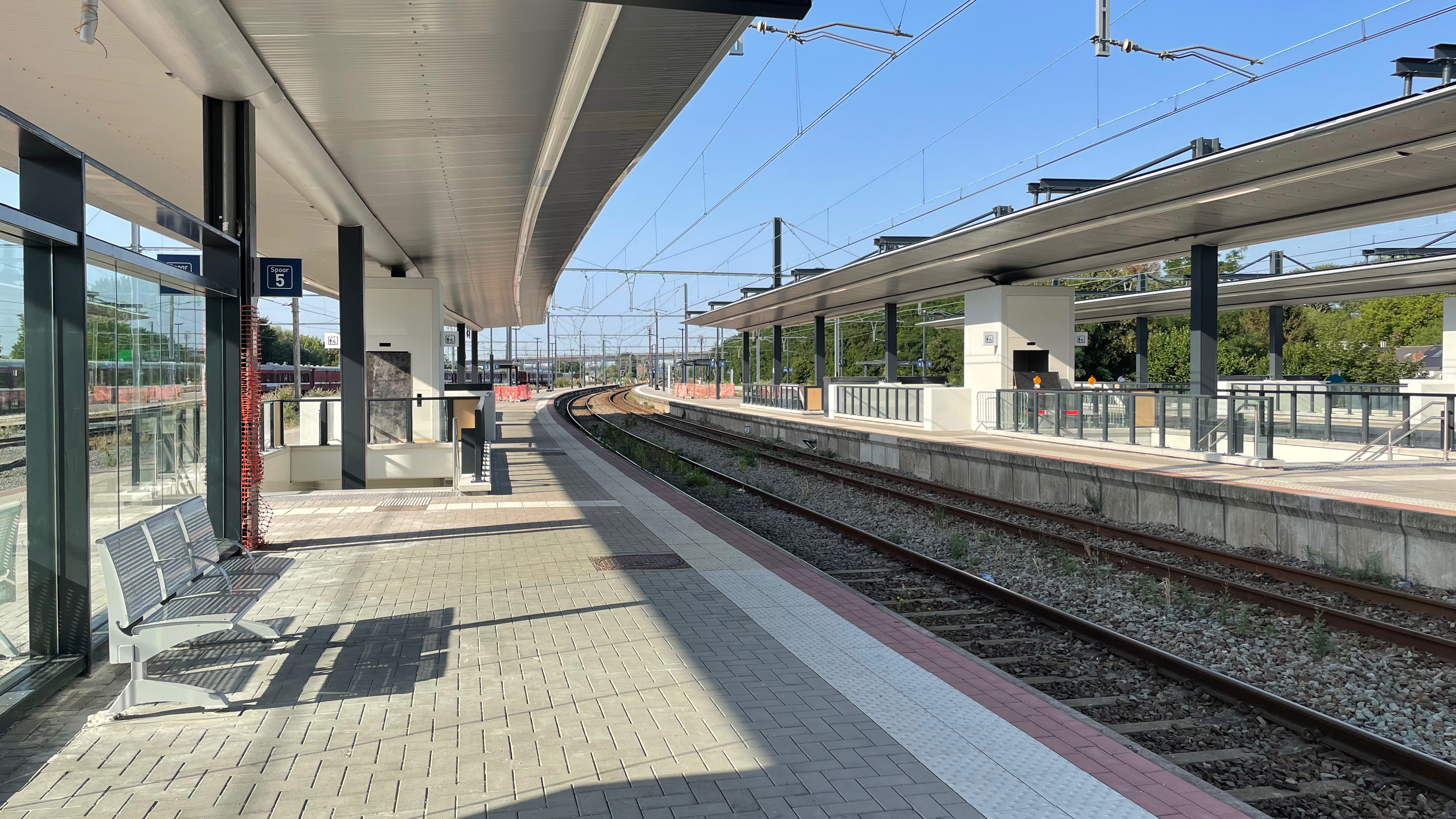
Another view of the platforms and tracks
