= Mechelen railway station =

Railway station in Antwerp, Belgium

Mechelen
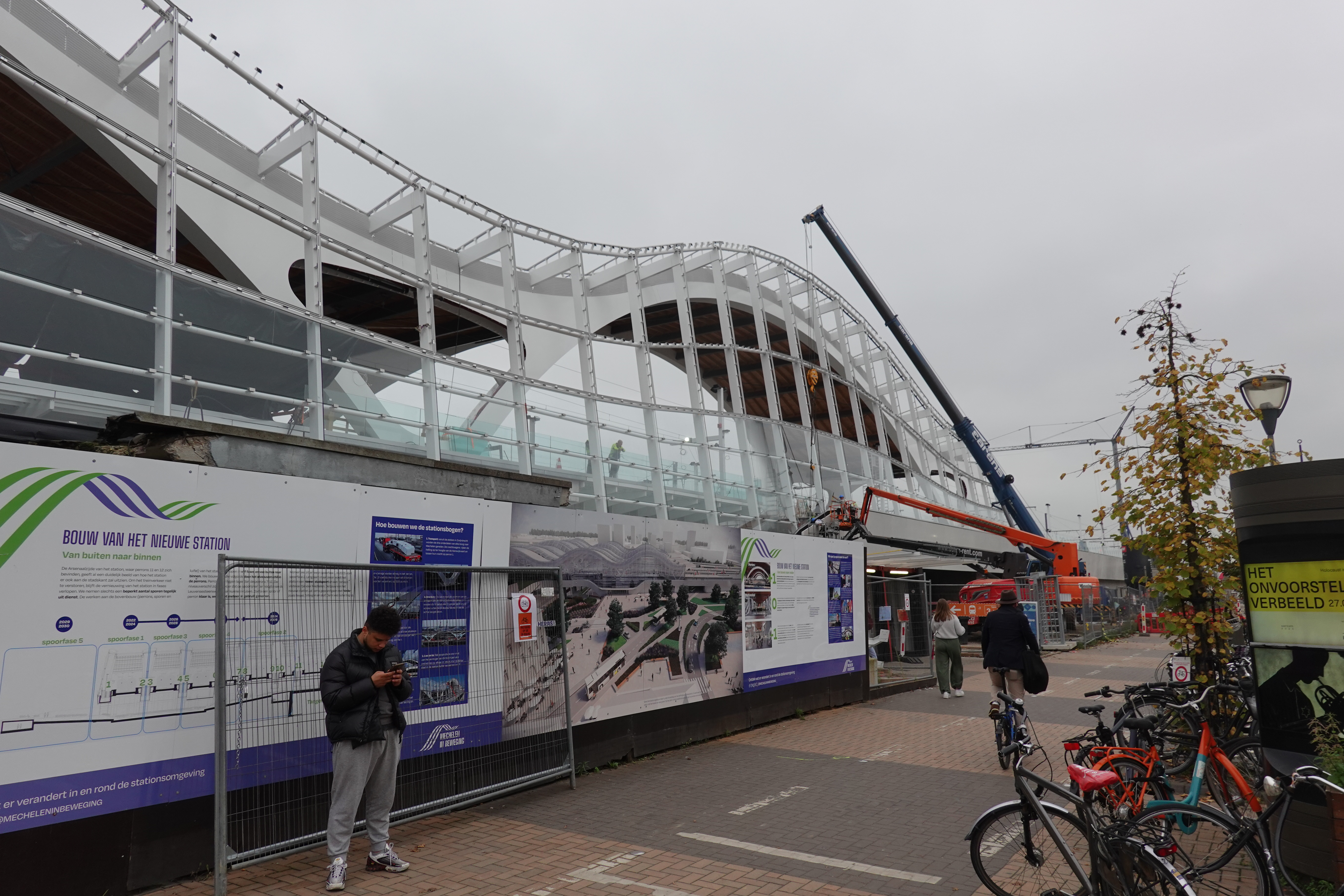
- Train hall construction in 2024

General information
- Location: Mechelen, Antwerp; Belgium
- Coordinates: 51°01′03″N 4°29′01″E
- System: Railway Station
- Owner: NMBS/SNCB
- Operator: NMBS/SNCB
- Lines: 25, 27, 53
- Platforms: 10
- Tracks: 10

Other information
- Station code: FM

History
- Opened: 5 May 1835; 191 years ago
Location
- Location within Belgium Location within Europe

Mechelen railway station (Dutch: Station Mechelen; French: Gare de Malines) (Note: Officially Mechelen (Dutch: Mechelen; French: Malines)) is a railway station in Mechelen, Antwerp, Belgium. The station opened on 5 May 1835 on railway lines 25, 27 and 53. The train services are operated by the National Railway Company of Belgium (NMBS/SNCB).

== History ==
On 5 May 1835, the first public train journey on the European mainland arrived near the station. The train line stopped just south of the station, as there was no bridge over the canal until 1836. Lines were built in all directions from the station: North to Antwerp, south to Brussels and France, east to Leuven, Liège and Verviers and west to Dendermonde, Ghent, Bruges and Ostend.

In 2013, major plans to modernise and rebuild the station started. This project is called Mechelen in Beweging. A 3-level underground car park has since been constructed. The current station buildings and tracks will be demolished and replaced. The building work is expected to take more than a decade as the work will need to be carried out platform by platform to retain enough capacity for the station.

== Features ==
The station has twelve platforms; the six on the eastern side are a few metres higher than the others. In 2012, a new higher-speed railway (line 25N) opened between Mechelen and Schaerbeek, in northern Brussels. This line also links Mechelen with Brussels Airport. Platforms 11 and 12 were added to the station in December 2020 to accommodate the additional trains from this line.

To the east of the station is the large Mechelen Train Works, where trains receive maintenance and heavy works, such as refurbishment.

== Train services ==
The following services currently serve the station:

- Intercity services (IC-05) Antwerp - Mechelen - Brussels - Nivelles - Charleroi
- Intercity services (IC-08) Antwerp - Mechelen - Brussels Airport - Leuven - Hasselt
- Intercity services (IC-11) Binche - Braine-le-Comte - Halle - Brussels - Mechelen - Turnhout (weekdays)
- Intercity services (IC-21) Ghent - Dendermonde - Mechelen - Leuven
- Intercity services (IC-22) Essen - Antwerp - Mechelen - Brussels (weekdays)
- Intercity services (IC-22) Antwerp - Mechelen - Brussels - Halle - Braine-le-Comte - Binche (weekends)
- Intercity services (IC-31) Antwerp - Mechelen - Brussels (weekdays)
- Intercity services (IC-31) Antwerp - Mechelen - Brussels - Nivelles - Charleroi (weekends)
- EuroCity services Rotterdam - Breda- Antwerp - Brussels Airport Zaventem - Brussels Midi/Zuid
- Local services (L-02) Zeebrugge - Bruges – Ghent – Dendermonde – Mechelen (weekdays)
- Local services (L-20) Sint-Niklaas – Mechelen – Leuven (weekdays)
- Local services (L-20) Mechelen - Leuven (weekends)
- Local services (L-27) Sint-Niklaas - Mechelen (weekends)
- Local services (L-28) Ghent - Dendermonde - Mechelen (weekends)
- Brussels RER services (S1) Antwerp - Mechelen - Brussels - Waterloo - Nivelles (weekdays)
- Brussels RER services (S1) Antwerp - Mechelen - Brussels (weekends)
- Brussels RER services (S5) Mechelen - Brussels-Luxembourg - Etterbeek - Halle - Enghien (- Geraardsbergen)
- Brussels RER services (S7) Mechelen - Merode - Halle

Preceding station	NS International	Following station
Antwerpen-Berchem towards Amsterdam Centraal	Eurocity 9200	Brussels National Airport towards Brussels-South
Preceding station	NMBS/SNCB	Following station
Antwerpen-Berchem towards Antwerpen-Centraal	IC 05	Bruxelles-Nord / Brussel-Noord towards Charleroi-Sud
Antwerpen-Berchem towards Antwerpen-Centraal	IC 08	Brussels National Airport towards Hasselt
Vilvoorde towards Binche	IC 11	Lier towards Turnhout
Londerzeel towards Gent-Sint-Pieters	IC 21	Muizen towards Leuven
Mechelen-Nekkerspoel towards Essen	IC 22 weekdays, except holidays	Vilvoorde towards Bruxelles-Midi / Brussel-Zuid
Mechelen-Nekkerspoel towards Antwerpen-Centraal	IC 22 weekends	Vilvoorde towards Binche
Mechelen-Nekkerspoel towards Antwerpen-Centraal	IC 31 weekdays, except holidays	Vilvoorde towards Bruxelles-Midi / Brussel-Zuid
Mechelen-Nekkerspoel towards Antwerpen-Centraal	IC 31 weekends	Vilvoorde towards Charleroi-Sud
Kapelle-op-den-Bos towards Zeebrugge-Dorp	L 02 weekdays	Terminus
Willebroek towards Sint-Niklaas	L 20 weekdays, except holidays	Muizen towards Leuven
Terminus	L 20 weekends	Muizen towards Leuven
Willebroek towards Sint-Niklaas	L 27 weekends	Terminus
Kapelle-op-den-Bos towards Gent-Sint-Pieters	L 28 weekends	Terminus
Mechelen-Nekkerspoel towards Antwerpen-Centraal	S 1 weekdays	Weerde towards Nivelles
Mechelen-Nekkerspoel towards Antwerpen-Centraal	S 1 weekends	Weerde towards Bruxelles-Midi / Brussel-Zuid
Terminus	S 5	Weerde towards Enghien
Terminus	S 7	Muizen towards Halle

== See also ==
- List of railway stations in Belgium
- Rail transport in Belgium
