= Belgian railway line 25 =

Railway line in Belgium

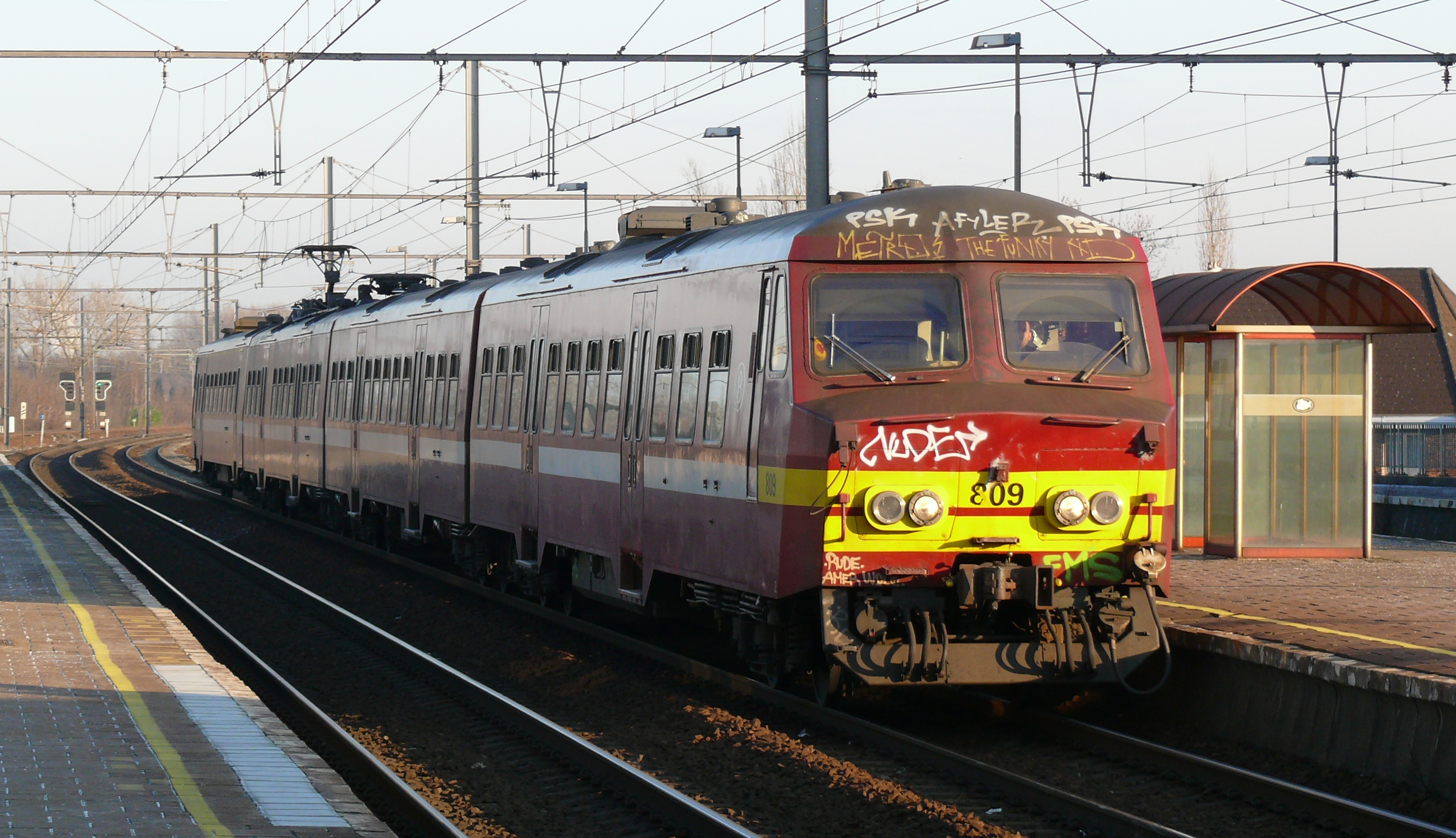
- NMBS 809 (type MS75) arrives at platform 4 of Mechelen-Nekkerspoel station in 2012

Overview
- Status: Operational
- Locale: Belgium
- Termini: Brussels-North railway station; Antwerpen-Luchtbal railway station

Service
Services
- Operator(s): National Railway Company of Belgium

History
- Opened: 1835-2007

Technical
- Line length: 48 km (30 mi)
- Number of tracks: double track
- Track gauge: 1,435 mm (4 ft 8 1/2 in) standard gauge
- Electrification: 3 kV DC
Route map
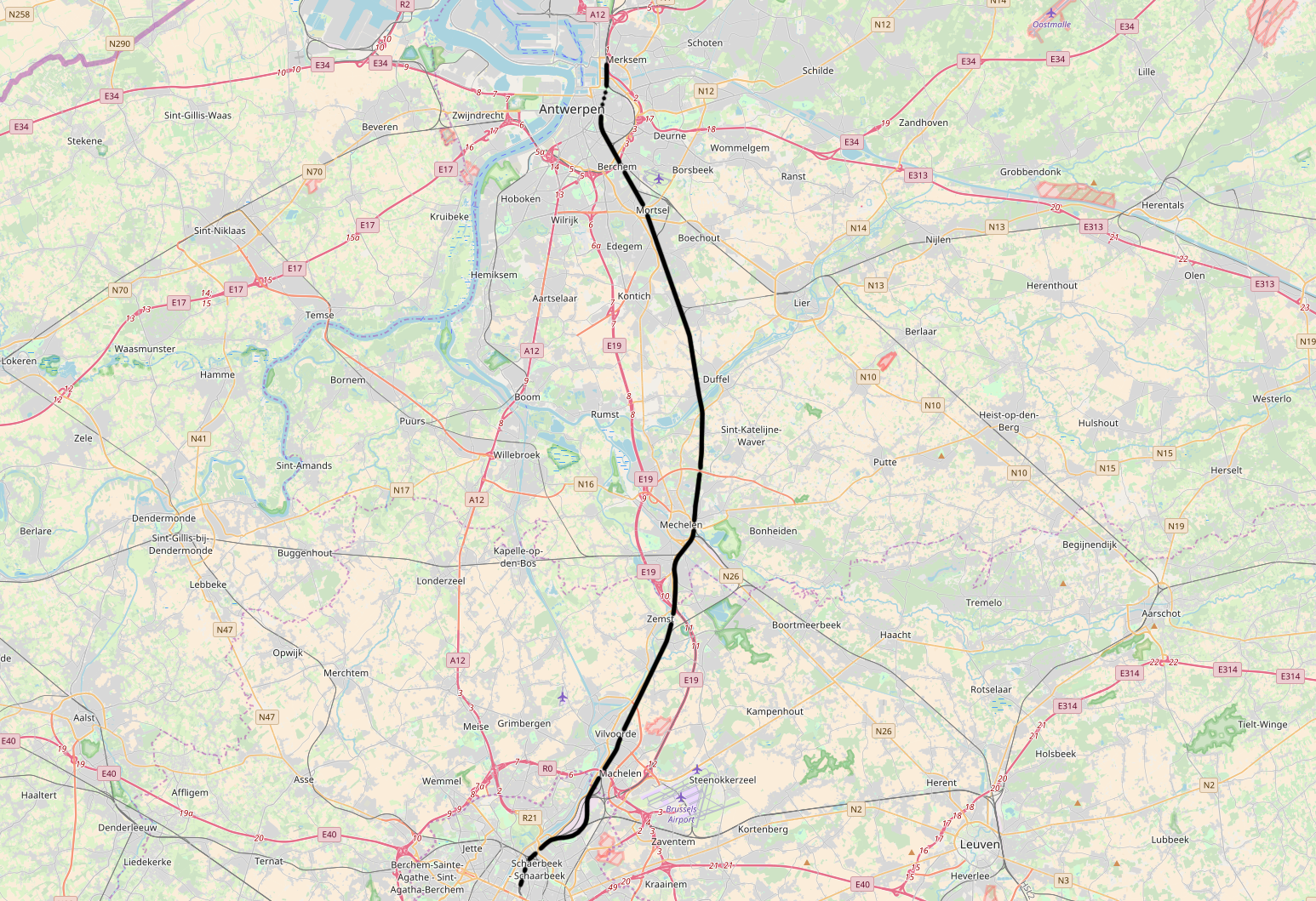

The Belgian railway line 25 is a railway line in Belgium connecting Brussels to Antwerp. The section between Brussels and Mechelen was completed on 5 May 1835 and was the first railway in Belgium and the first public passenger steam railway in continental Europe. On 3 May 1836, the second section, between Mechelen and Antwerp, was opened. It was extended to Luchtbal in the north of Antwerp in 2007 by means of a tunnel under the city in order to shorten the route from Amsterdam to Brussels. The total line runs 47.6 km (29.6 mi).

Over most of its length, it is paralleled by line 27 so that four tracks are available. During business hours, line 25 serves fast trains while local trains use line 27.

The line goes through the following stations:

- Brussels-North
- Schaarbeek
- Buda
- Vilvoorde
- Eppegem
- Weerde
- Mechelen
- Mechelen-Nekkerspoel
- Sint-Katelijne-Waver
- Duffel
- Kontich
- Hove
- Mortsel-Oude-God
- Mortsel-Deurnesteenweg
- Antwerpen-Berchem
- Antwerpen-Central
- Antwerpen-Luchtbal

== L25N ==
A recent addition is line 25N, which branches off south of Mechelen to follow the E19 motorway into the Diabolo to Brussels Airport. As of 2019, works are underway to extend this line 25N through the Mechelen station, adding two platforms, to rejoin the "regular" line 25 North of Nekkerspoel station. L25N has 3 kV DC electrification, and allows speeds up to 160 km/h (100 mph).
