= 1864 in rail transport =

This article lists events related to rail transport that occurred in 1864.

== Events ==
=== January events ===
- The Central Pacific Railroad hires its first Chinese workers. One of them, Hung Wah, will go on to command the largest and longest-working work crew on the CPRR.
- January 10 – The Illinois Central, Columbus and Indianapolis and Richmond and Covington railroads sign an agreement for joint operation as the Great Central Line between Columbus, Ohio, and Indianapolis, Indiana, headed by the Indiana Central Railway.
- January 13 – Samuel C. Pomeroy succeeds Cyrus K. Holliday as president of the Atchison, Topeka and Santa Fe Railway.
- January 16 – The San Francisco and San Jose Railroad is completed to San Jose, California.

=== June events ===
- The first railway track in Indonesia was laid between Semarang and Tanggung, Central Java by the Dutch colonial government.
- June 3 – The first revenue trains operate over the Central Pacific Railroad between Sacramento, California and Newcastle, California.
- June 29 – St-Hilaire train disaster, Beloeil, Quebec, Canada: 99 killed when an immigrant train fails to stop at an open swing bridge and falls into the Richelieu River.

=== July events ===
- July – Samuel Marsh succeeds Nathaniel Marsh for a second term as president of the Erie Railroad.
- July 2 – The Northern Pacific Railway is chartered to build a northern transcontinental railroad in the United States.
- July 9 – Franz Muller kills Thomas Briggs in a North London Railway train, the first British railway murder.

=== August events ===
- August 24 - The United States Postal Service inaugurates the first railway post office route in the United States when Chicago Assistant Postmaster George B. Armstrong authorizes the route on the Chicago and North Western Railway between Chicago and Clinton, Iowa.

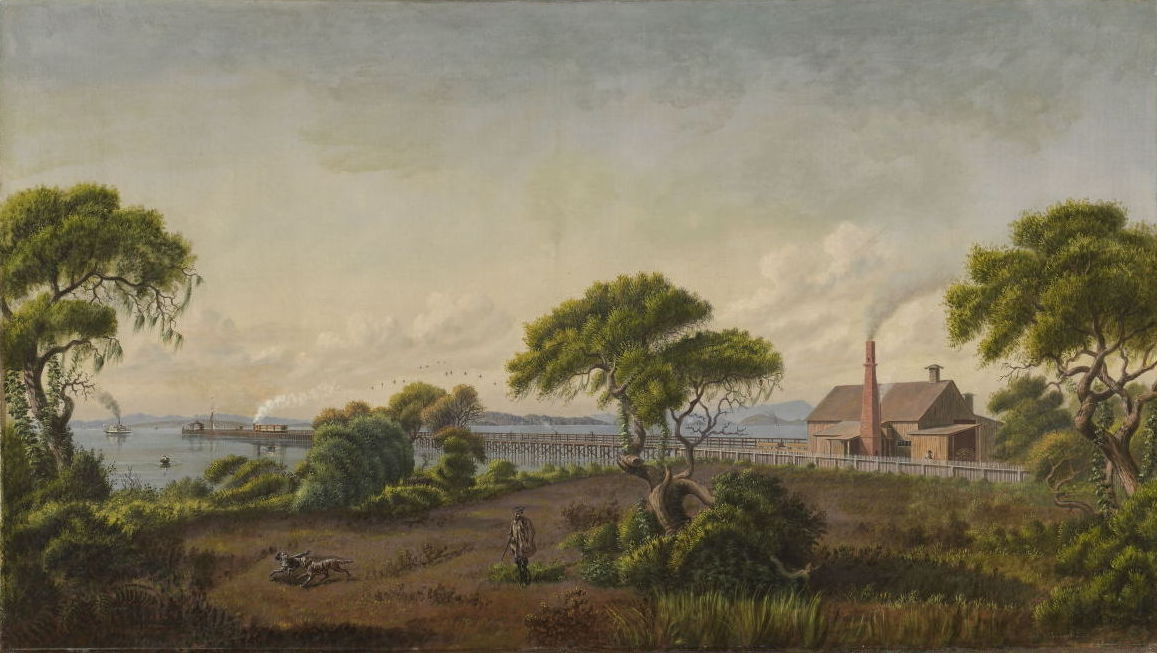
Alameda Shore (Joseph Lee, c. 1868) depicts a ferry meeting the first run of the San Francisco and Alameda Railroad on August 25, 1864.

- August 25 - The San Francisco and Alameda Railroad begins operation between Alameda Terminal and San Leandro, California.

=== October events ===
- October – Robert H. Berdell succeeds Samuel Marsh as president of the Erie Railroad.

=== Unknown date events ===
- Cornelius Vanderbilt acquires the Hudson River Railroad.
- Murray, Dougal and Company, later to become part of American Car and Foundry, is founded in Milton, Pennsylvania.

== Births ==
=== February births ===
- February 6 – George Jay Gould I, eldest son of Jay Gould, president of the Denver and Rio Grande Railroad and the Western Pacific Railroad (d. 1923).

=== June births ===
- June 8 – Herbert William Garratt, English steam locomotive builder and inventor of the Garratt locomotive type (d. 1913).

=== July births ===
- July 15 – Franklin Knight Lane, Interstate Commerce Commission commissioner 1905–1913, chairman of same in 1913, is born (d. 1921).

=== October births ===
- October 23 – Victor Spencer, 1st Viscount Churchill, chairman of the Great Western Railway (Great Britain) 1908–1934 (d. 1934).

== Deaths ==
=== Unknown date deaths ===
- Stephen H. Long, American steam locomotive mechanical engineer who helped build the Baltimore and Ohio Railroad (b. 1784).
