= Mortsel =

- City and municipality
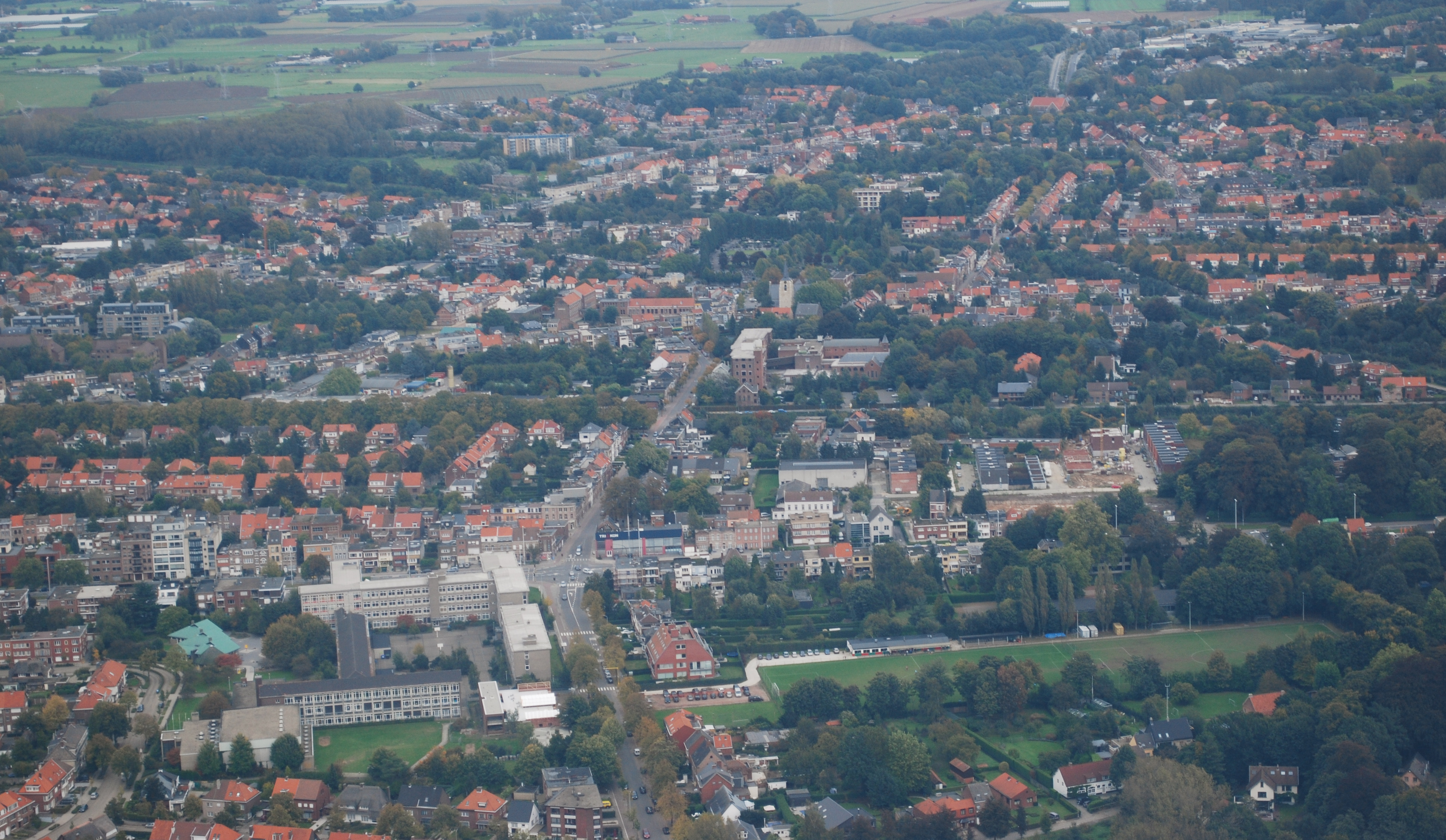
- Aerial view of Mortsel

- Flag Coat of arms

- Location of Mortsel in the province of Antwerp
- Interactive map of Mortsel
- Location in Belgium
- Coordinates: 51°10′N 04°28′E
- Country: Belgium
- Community: Flemish Community
- Region: Flemish Region
- Province: Antwerp
- Arrondissement: Antwerp

Government
  - Mayor: Erik Broeckx (N-VA)
  - Governing parties: N-VA, Vooruit-I love Mortsel, CD&V

Area
  - Total: 7.78 km^{2} (3.00 sq mi)

Population (2022-01-01)
  - Total: 26,181
  - Density: 3,370/km^{2} (8,720/sq mi)
- Postal codes: 2640
- NIS code: 11029
- Area codes: 03
- Website: www.mortsel.be

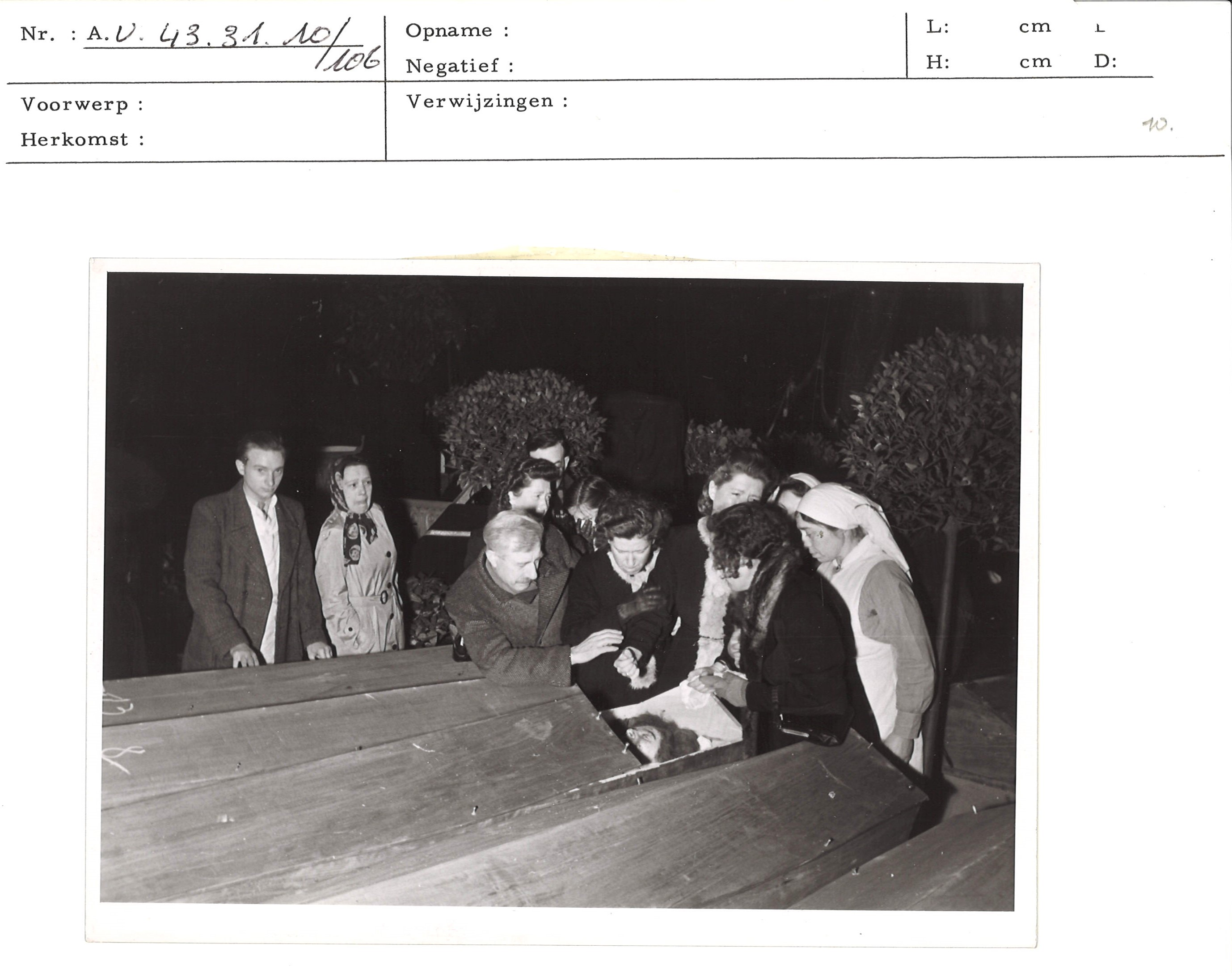
Identification of victims of the misguided bombardement in 1943

Mortsel (Dutch pronunciation: [ˈmɔrtsəl]) is a municipality and city close to the city of Antwerp located in the Belgian province of Antwerp. The municipality only comprises the city of Mortsel proper. In 2024, Mortsel had a total population of 26,588 people which makes it the most densely populated municipality in Flanders with 3416 inhabitants per km². The total area is 7.78 km².

== Geography ==
The city consists of the areas Mortsel-Dorp, Oude-God and Luithagen. Mortsel is bordered by Antwerp (districts Wilrijk, Berchem and Deurne), Borsbeek, Boechout, Hove, and Edegem.

== History ==
Mortsel was the scene for one of the major collateral damage tragedies of World War II. On 5 April 1943, the Minerva car factory, then used to repair Luftwaffe planes, was the target of a bombing raid by the USAAF. Most bombs missed the target and hit a residential area instead, resulting in the deaths of 936 civilians, including 209 children, exceeding the civilian death toll of the Guernica raid which modern estimates put at 400.

The last V2 launched against Antwerp also fell in Mortsel, killing 27 people, on 27 March 1945.

== Economy ==
The headquarters of Agfa-Gevaert are situated in Mortsel.

== Notable people ==
- Alex Agnew, stand-up comedian
- Luc Brewaeys, (born in Mortsel in 1959), composer, conductor, pianist and recording producer
- Daniel Dardha, chess player
- Bart De Wever, politician
- Timo Descamps, actor
- Koen Lenaerts, President of the European Court of Justice
- Clem Schouwenaars (b. Mortsel, 1932–1993), writer
- Tamino, musician
- Luc Tuymans, painter
- Johan Van Overtveldt (born in Mortsel in 1955), Belgian journalist and politician of the New Flemish Alliance
- Jos Vandeloo, writer

See also the Category:People from Mortsel.
