= Jette =

Municipality of the Brussels-Capital Region, Belgium

- Municipality
- Jette's Municipal Hall

- Flag Coat of arms

- Jette municipality in the Brussels-Capital Region
- Interactive map of Jette
- Location in Belgium
- Coordinates: 50°52′N 04°20′E
- Country: Belgium
- Community: Flemish Community; French Community
- Region: Brussels-Capital
- Arrondissement: Brussels-Capital

Government
  - Mayor: Claire Vandevivere (LBJette-Les Engagés)
  - Governing parties: LBJette, MR-VLD, Ecolo

Area
  - Total: 5.19 km^{2} (2.00 sq mi)

Population (2020-01-01)
  - Total: 52,728
  - Density: 10,200/km^{2} (26,300/sq mi)
- Postal codes: 1090
- NIS code: 21010
- Area codes: 02
- Website: jette.irisnet.be/en (in English) jette.irisnet.be/fr (in French) jette.irisnet.be/nl (in Dutch)

Jette (French: [ʒɛt]; Dutch: [ˈjɛtə]) is one of the 19 municipalities of the Brussels-Capital Region, Belgium. Located in the north-western part of the region, it is bordered by the City of Brussels, Ganshoren, Koekelberg, and Molenbeek-Saint-Jean, as well as the Flemish municipalities of Asse and Wemmel. Like all municipalities in Brussels, it is officially bilingual (French–Dutch).

As of 1 January 2024, the municipality had a population of 54,107 inhabitants. The total area is 5.19 km^{2} (2.00 sq mi), which gives a population density of 10,427/km^{2} (27,010/sq mi).

== History ==
=== Origins to Middle Ages ===
Neolithic tools and remains of a Gallo-Roman villa have been found on the territory of Jette, proving the old age of the first settlements in this area. The fact that its first church was dedicated to Saint Peter also indicates early Christianisation. During the Middle Ages, parts of the territory were feudal dependencies of the Duchy of Brabant. Under the duke's protection, Dieleghem Abbey was founded in 1095 by the Bishop of Cambrai and administered by Augustinian canons. In 1140, the Abbey's monks switched to the rules of the Premonstratensian order. In the 13th century, the Abbey possessed half of the municipality's territory and played an important social and economic role until the French Revolution.

=== 17th–20th centuries ===
During the Ancien Régime, Jette was part of the town of Merchtem, located in modern-day Flemish Brabant. In the 17th century, during the period of the Spanish Netherlands, the Finance Minister under Archdukes Albert and Isabella acquired and refurbished the old 12th-century Rivieren Castle in the village of Ganshoren, near Jette. In 1654, the minister's son made this estate into a barony, then five years later, into a county, which included Jette and several neighbouring villages.

In the 1790s, the regime that was put in power by the French Revolution curtailed the religious freedoms drastically. The monks were expelled from the Abbey in 1796, and most of the buildings demolished the following year. Only the abbot's house was kept as a leisure house. In 1841, Ganshoren split from Jette. During the following decades, what remained of Jette gradually lost its rural character to become a suburb of Brussels. Its population, which was of around 10,000 in 1900 grew to more than 40,000 in 1971.

== Main sights ==
Jette has a rich cultural and architectural heritage. Some of the main points of interest include:

- The Municipal Hall of Jette, by the architect Jules Van Ysendyck, dates from the beginning of the 20th century.
- The abbot's mansion, the only extant building of Dieleghem Abbey, has been converted into a mostly historical museum.
- Jette has kept a few of its old pubs and breweries, as well as a blacksmith's workshop that still operated until 1960.
- The René Magritte Museum was set up in the house where the famous painter lived and worked for twenty-four years. Since November 2019, the Museum of Abstract Art has opened next to it. The two museums can be visited together.
- The Vrije Universiteit Brussel (VUB), the Dutch-speaking university of Brussels has built its hospital and medical campus in Jette, while its other buildings are in the so-called Etterbeek campus actually located in Ixelles.
- Jette railway station, which opened in 1892, and is located on the Place Cardinal Mercier/Kardinaal Mercierplein, south of King Baudouin Park.
- Finally, the municipality maintains several green areas, including Dieleghem Wood and Laerbeek Wood.
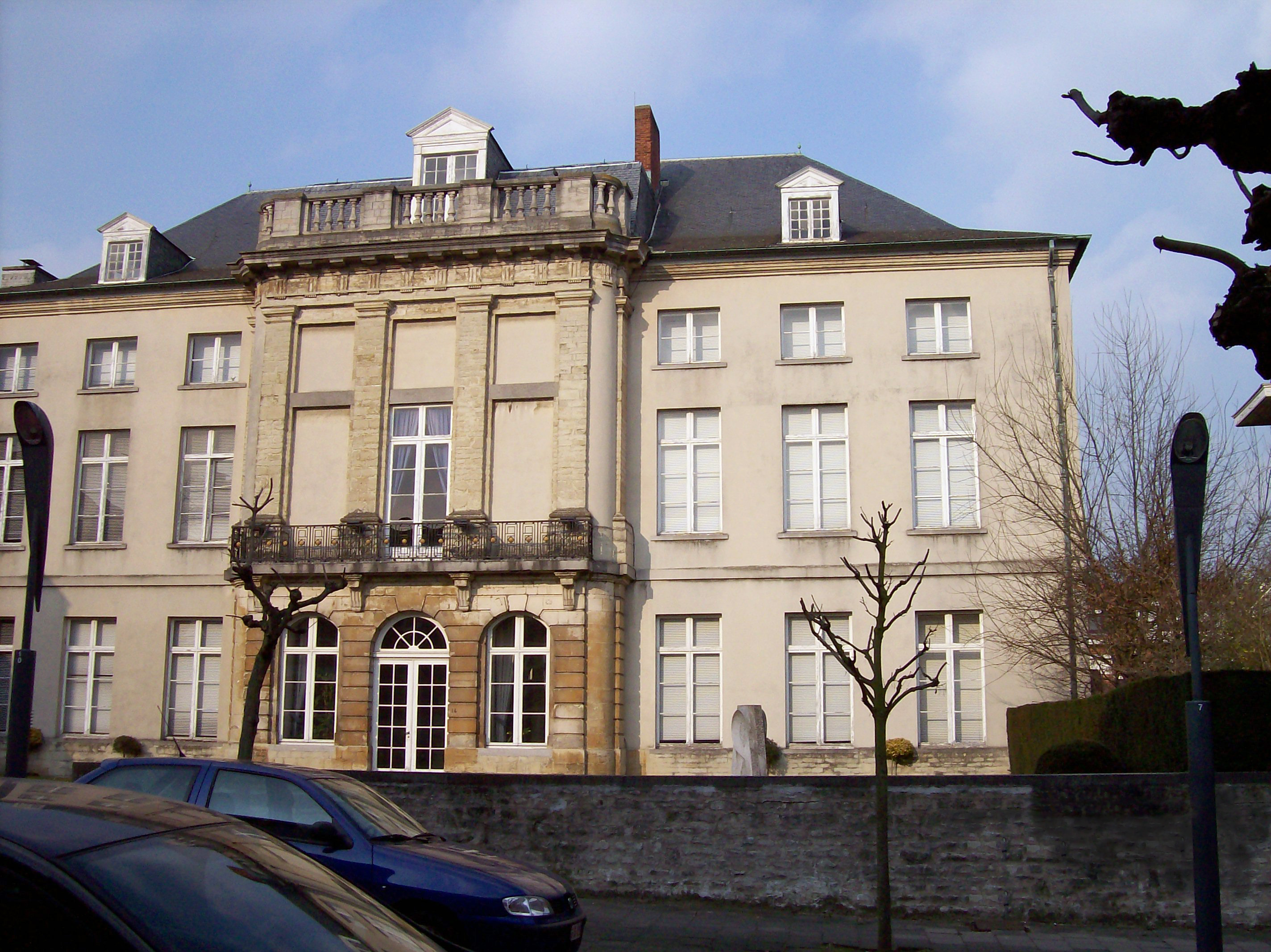
Abbot's mansion of Dieleghem Abbey

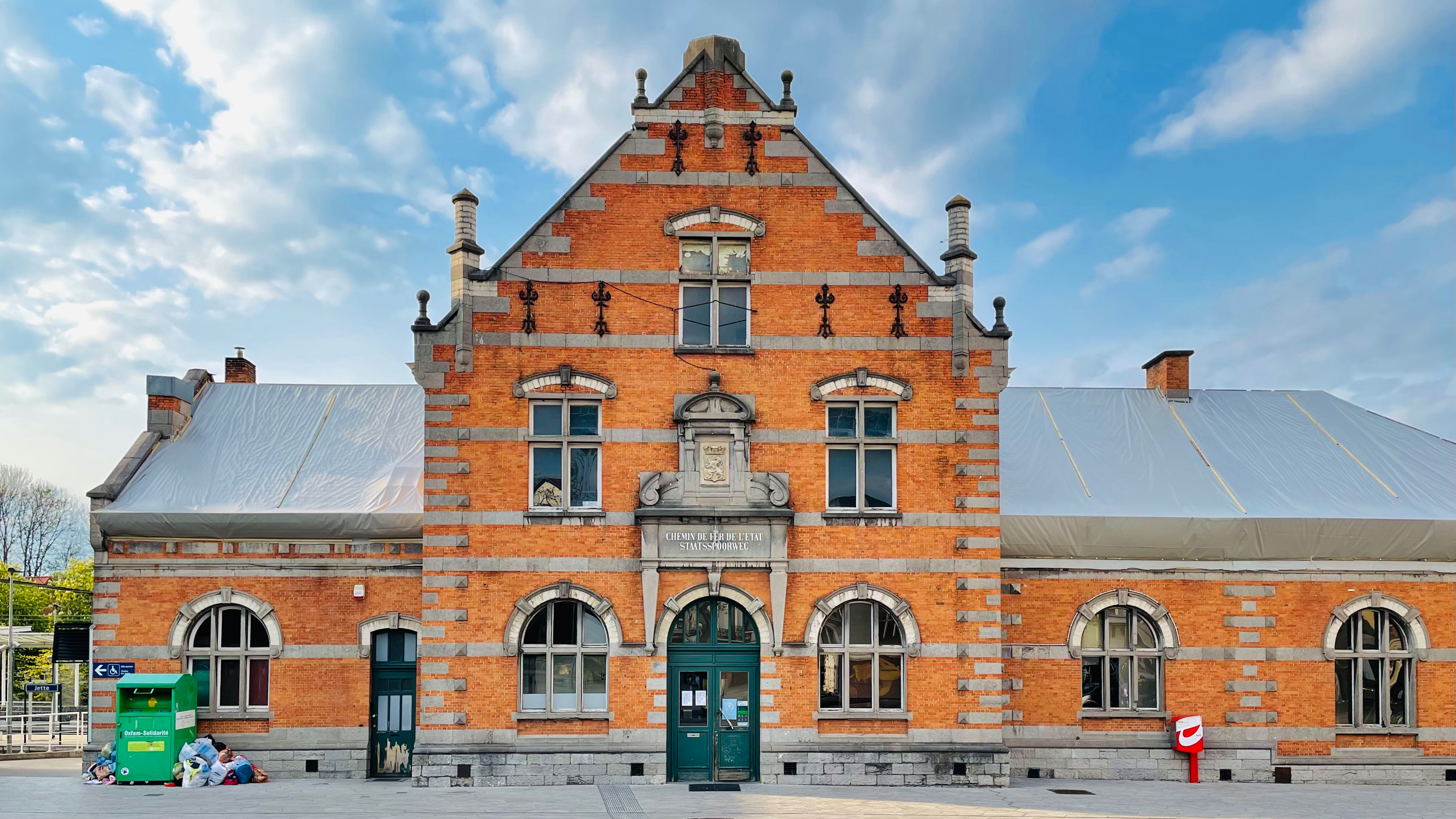
Jette railway station

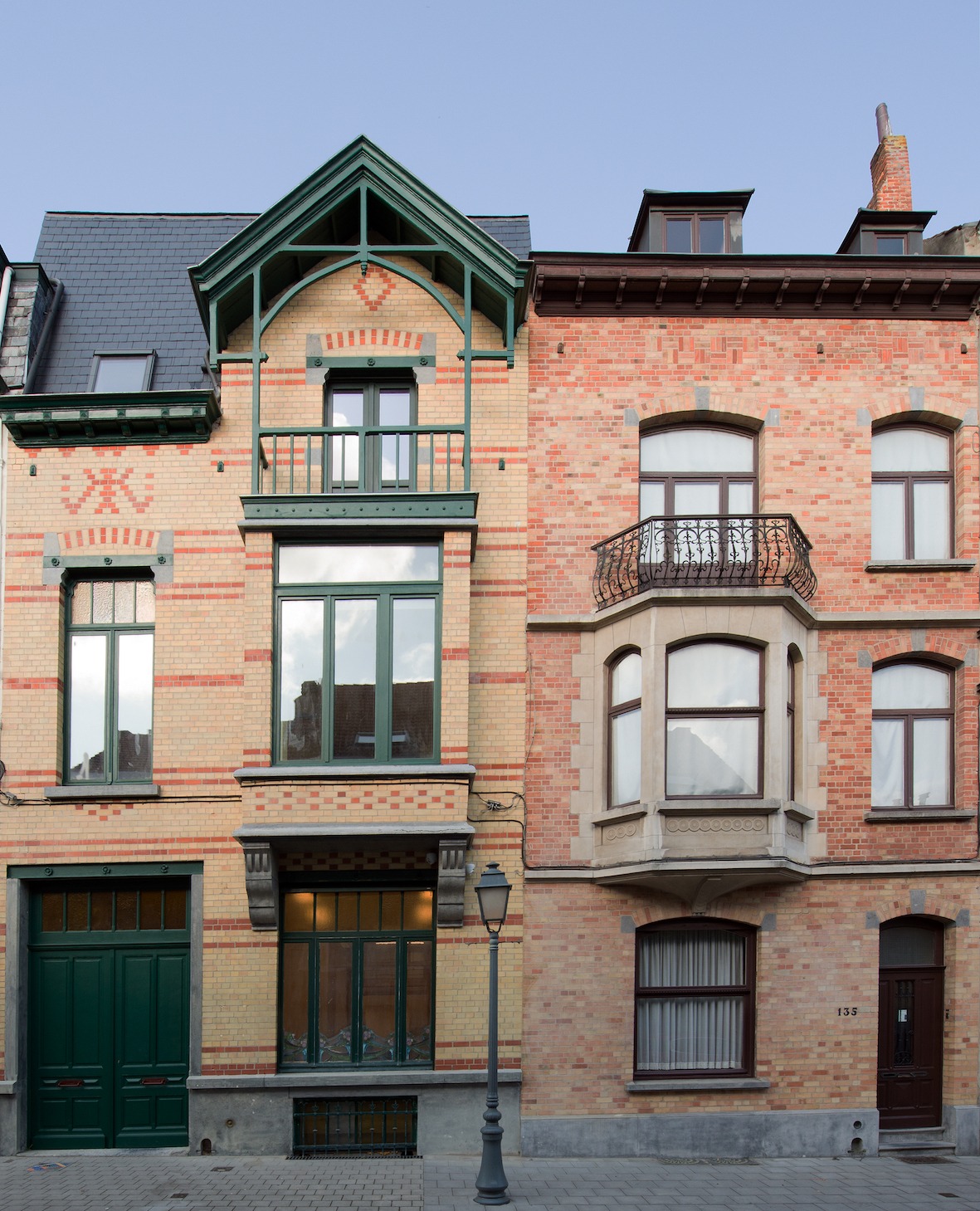
René Magritte Museum (right) and Museum of Abstract Art (left)

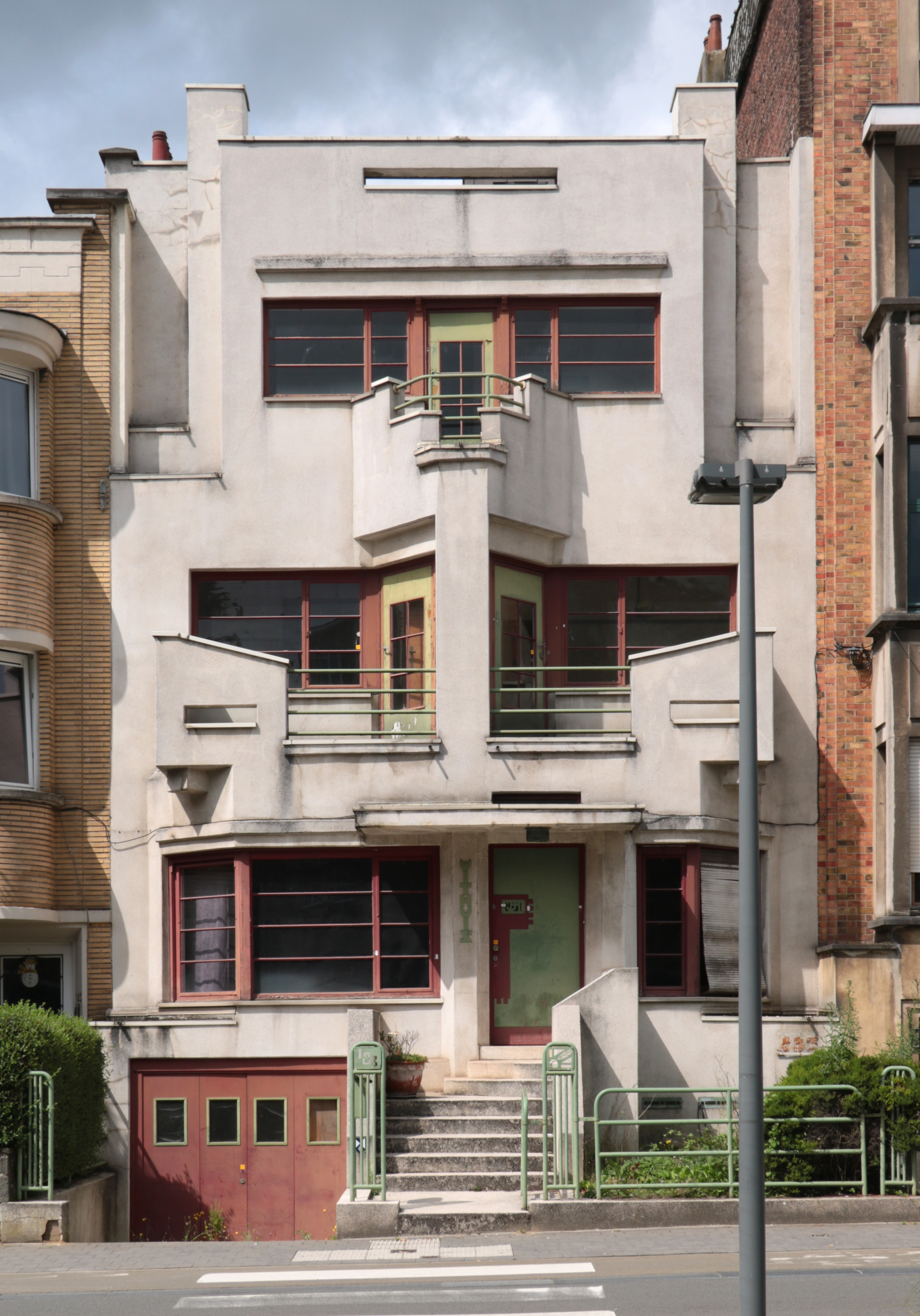
Withuis

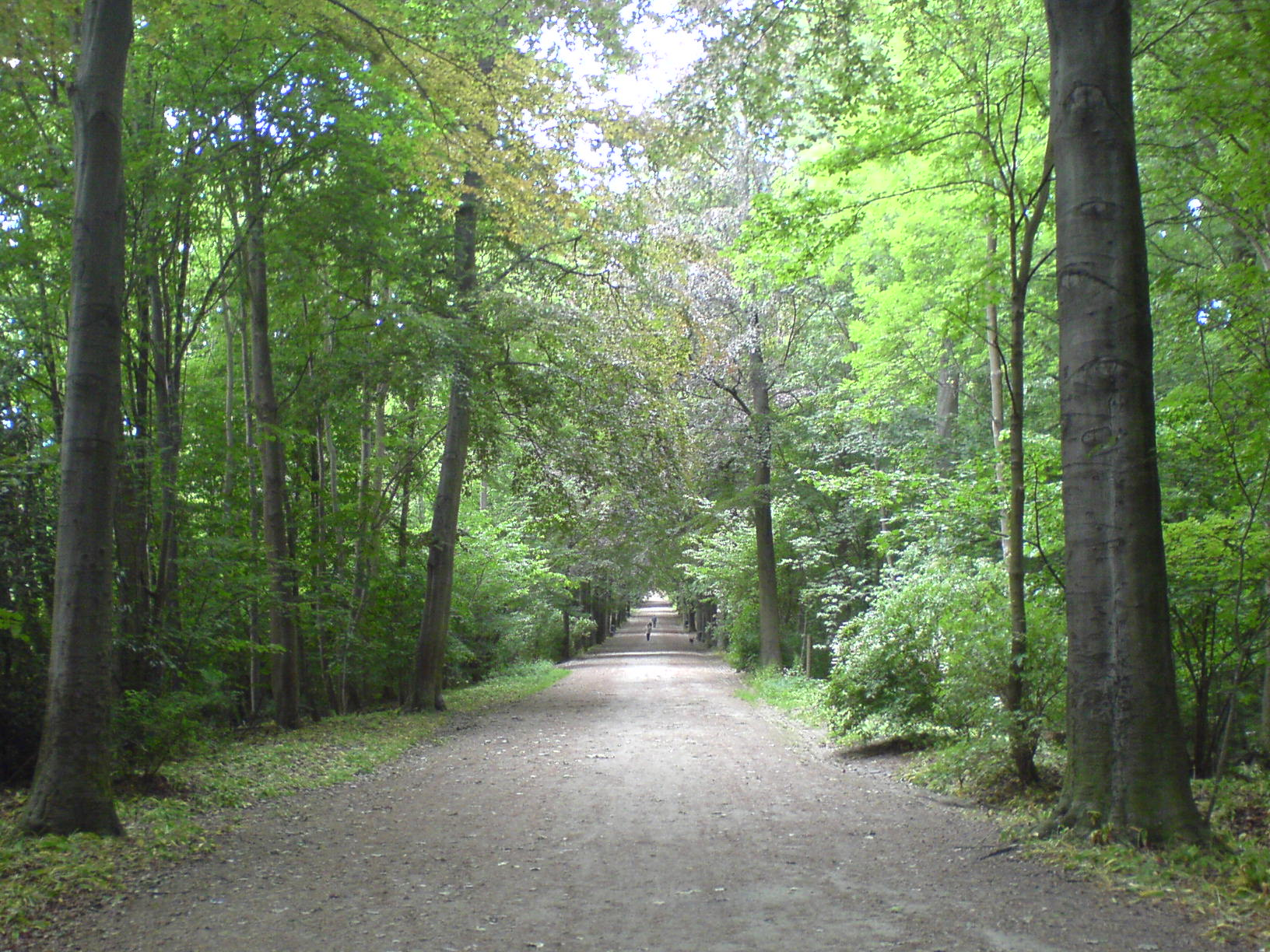
Dieleghem Wood

== Notable inhabitants ==
- Thomas Chatelle (born 1981), football player
- Rik Coolsaet (born 1951), Professor of International Relations at Ghent University
- Jason Denayer (born 1995), football player
- Eric Ghysels (born 1956), economist
- René Magritte (1898–1967), surrealist painter
- François Narmon (born 1934), businessman, was born there.
- Jean Roba (1930–2006), comic book author, creator of Boule et Bill

== International relations ==
=== Twin towns and sister cities ===
Jette is twinned with:

- Sidi Bibi, Morocco
- Jojutla, Mexico
