= Het Heideken =

Neighbourhood in Brussels, Belgium

- Neighbourhood
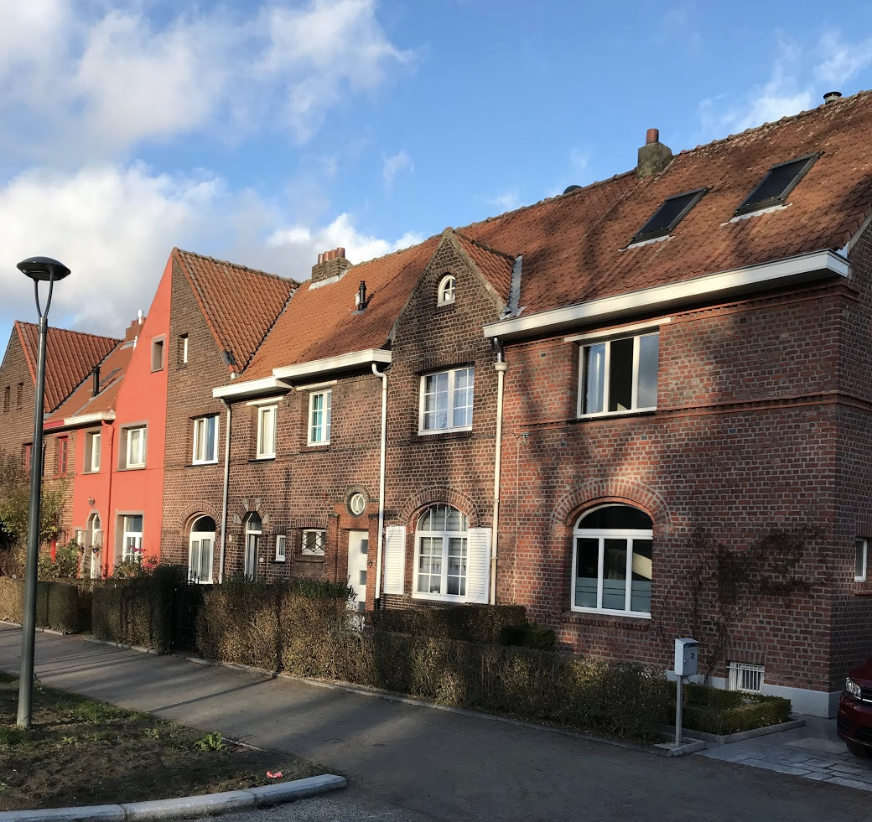
- Houses on the Square du Centenaire/Eeuwfeestsquare in Het Heideken

- Location within Brussels Het Heideken (Belgium)
- Coordinates: 50°52′37.5884″N 4°19′3.9684″E
- Country: Belgium
- Region: Brussels-Capital Region
- Arrondissement: Brussels-Capital
- Municipality: Ganshoren
- First mentioned: 1228
- Construction start: 1923
- Time zone: UTC+1 (CET)
  - Summer (DST): UTC+2 (CEST)
- Postal code: 1083
- Area codes: 02

Het Heideken is a district of Ganshoren, a municipality of Brussels, Belgium. The housing complex is uniquely shaped like a butterfly or kite and stretches across both sides of Avenue de l'Exposition Universelle/Wereldtentoonstellingslaan. It was commissioned by the Société Coopérative Le Home, designed by the architect Jules Ghobert and constructed between 1923 and 1925.

== Toponymy ==
The name Het Heideken predates the neighbourhood and derives from the Dutch word heide, meaning "heath", reflecting the area's original landscape. Historically, Het Heideken referred to the vicinity around what is now the Square du Centenaire/Eeuwfeestsquare, where the Café du Heideken was once located.

Old postcards refer to the area as the Cité Jardin de l'avenue de Jette, while press articles from the 1920s used Cité jardin du Home. Over time, the name Het Heideken became broadly associated with this part of Ganshoren, encompassing both the social housing development and the surrounding neighbourhood.

== History ==
In 1228, Duke Henry the Courageous designated the Het Heideken area as common land for the people of Ganshoren. At the entrance to this land stood the Krekelsgat, a site leased in 1567 by the Lord of Rivieren to Jean De Bonte.

By 1596, Lambert Smoors owned the site and had established a brewery and inn. By the 1800s, it had developed into an farm-inn with two buildings, a white cottage and a red-brick one, arranged around a small terrace overlooking a large green. The red-brick building's arched entrance bore the date 1647, while the courtyard had uneven cobblestones where chickens pecked grain, and inside, wooden floors and shelves of crockery.

The De Vleeschauwer family settled in the area in 1833, followed by their cousin Jacques Fierens. The farm and surrounding land appeared on an 1858 map under the name Ey Hof ("egg farm").

The Café du Heideken, which was situated at 90, rue Communale/Gemeentestraat, served as an important social centre, hosting meetings for numerous associations, including the archery club De Ware Vrienden, founded in 1873.

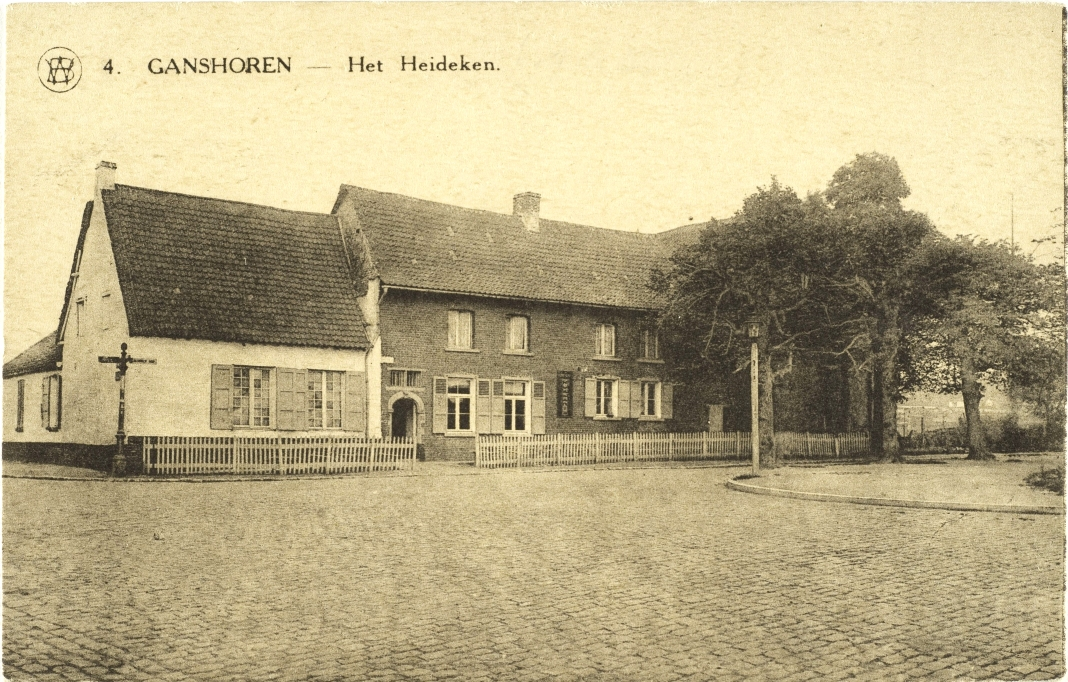
Het Heideken c. 1920

Between 1923 and 1925, the Het Heideken housing estate was built. It extends on both sides of the Avenue de l'Exposition Universelle, forming its distinctive butterfly or kite shape. The estate is primarily organised around the Place du Home/Homeplein on the eastern wing, bordered by the even-numbered side of the Drève du Château/Kasteeldreef, and the Place des Sorbiers/Sorbeboomplein on the western wing, adjacent to the odd-numbered Rue Communale. The complex was officially inaugurated in September 1925.

The farm-inn remained a local landmark until 1952, when it was demolished to widen the Avenue de Jette/Jetse laan for tram line 13, which only operated for fifteen years. The original farm entrance gate, was preserved and relocated roughly 50 metres (160 ft) west to the centre of the Square du Centenaire.

== Popular culture ==
The farm-inn and the Het Heideken area have been depicted by various artists, including Victor Fermeus, Victor Wagemaekers, Jules Rambo, Jean Willems, Robert Desart, Willem Bataille, and Amédée Lynen.

== See also ==
- Neighbourhoods in Brussels
- History of Brussels
