= Laerbeek Wood =

Forest in Jette, Belgium

Laerbeek Wood French: Bois du Laerbeek Dutch: Laarbeekbos
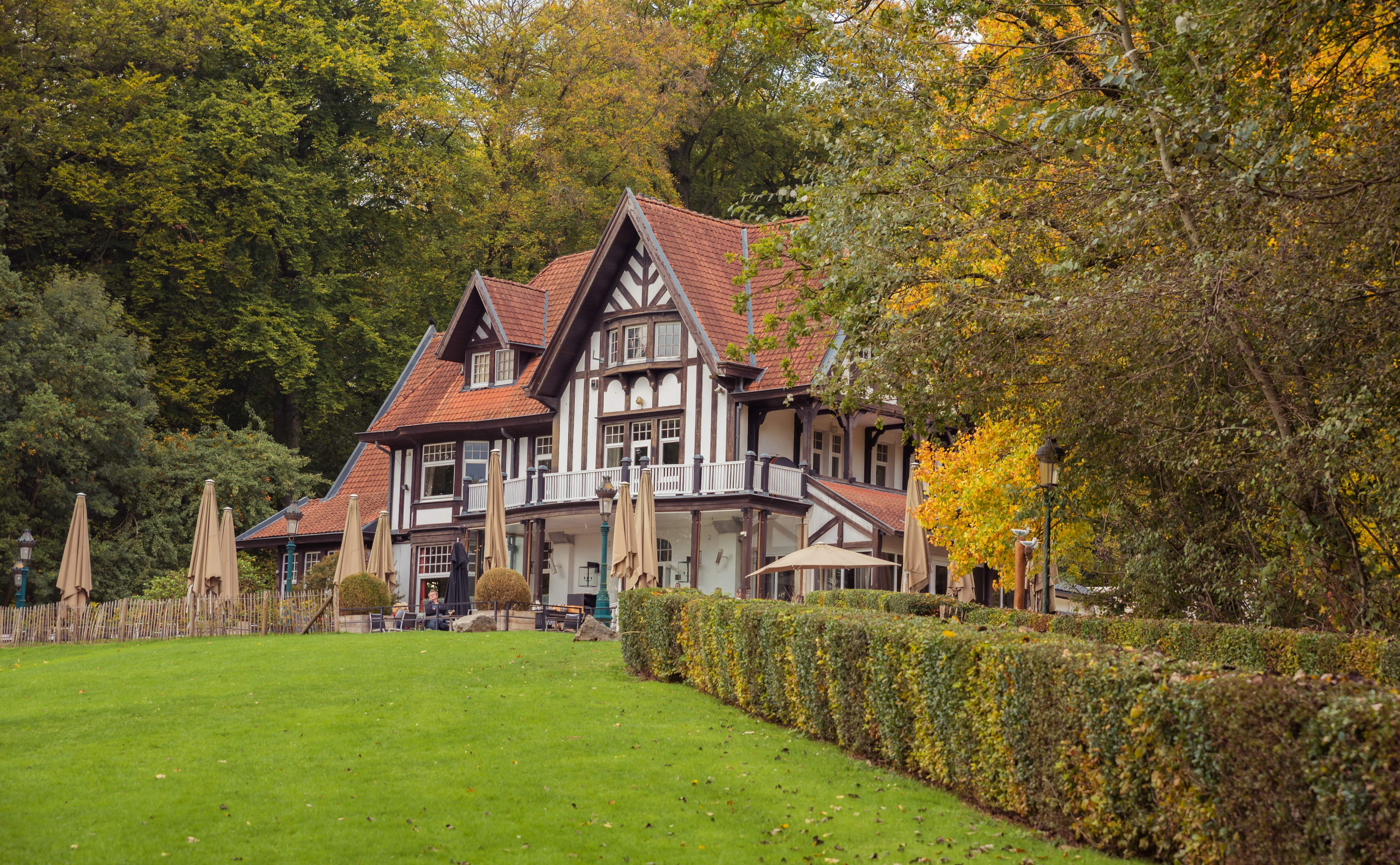
- The chalet of Laerbeek Wood

- Location within Belgium
- Interactive map of Laerbeek Wood

Geography
- Location: Jette, Brussels-Capital Region, Belgium
- Coordinates: 50°53′16″N 4°17′56″E
- Area: 34 ha (84 acres)

Laerbeek Wood (French: Bois du Laerbeek) or Laarbeek Wood (Dutch: Laarbeekbos) is a public forest in the municipality of Jette in Brussels, Belgium. It covers an area of 34 hectares (84 acres), making it the largest forest area in the north of the Brussels-Capital Region. The forest is located on the border with the Flemish Region and is connected to an open space in the north, although the Brussels Ring forms a barrier there. To the south and south-east, Laerbeek Wood borders other green areas: the Poelbos, King Baudouin Park and the Jette-Ganshoren Marshes. To the east, the forest borders the Campus Jette with the UZ Brussel.

The appearance of Laerbeek Wood, with its many old beeches, is somewhat reminiscent of the Sonian Forest. The past of Laerbeek Wood, like that of the neighbouring Dieleghem Wood and Poelbos, is linked to the history of the Premonstratensian Dieleghem Abbey, founded in the 11th century.

Laerbeek Wood has an exceptional biodiversity and is part of the Natura 2000 Special Protection Area in the Brussels-Capital Region.

== History ==
The area around Laerbeek Wood was already inhabited in Roman times, as evidenced by the Roman villa of Jette, which was excavated there.

Dielegem Abbey, founded in the 11th century, started a limestone quarry on the site of the present forest. The place was given the name het laar. The stones from the quarry were used for the construction of the abbey itself, as well as for the Church of Our Lady in Mechelen and part of the Cathedral of St. Michael and St. Gudula in Brussels. The operation of the quarry was terminated in the 15th century because the quarry there hit the groundwater table and this made mining too difficult due to flooding. The abbey sought another productive use for the land and decided to plant a forest there. Around 1600, however, the area of the forest was only 5 hectares (12 acres). Over the next two centuries, the forest expanded significantly to more than 100 hectares (250 acres) by the end of the 18th century. The forest then reached as far as the Molenbeek brook.

After the French Revolution, the abbey's property came into the hands of the state. From 1796, the forest came into the hands of various speculators. Among the various owners, the area of the forest reduced by two-thirds during the 19th century. One of the owners, Eugène Van den Elschen, an Ixelles lawyer, built a Normandy-style pavilion on the southern edge of the forest in 1908. This chalet is now a restaurant and is part of the expansion of King Baudouin Park (third phase).

In 1962, the municipality of Jette became the owner of the forest and the chalet. In 1976, the forest was classified as a valuable forest and landscape and in 1977, the municipality sold it to the Belgian state, Department of Waters and Forests. After regionalisation, it was transferred to Brussels Environment. Part of the forest has been protected as a regional nature reserve since 1998. The forest is under European protection as part of the Natura 2000 Habitat Directive Area "Forests and wetlands of the Molenbeek valley in the north-west of the Brussels region".

== Fauna and flora ==
The forest is located on a slope with an orientation to the south. In the middle of the forest, there is a deep valley created by the exploitation of the quarry. Here there is also a forest pond of about 30 metres (98 ft) in length. Similar to the Sonian Forest, Laerbeek Wood has a plantation of beech trees (Fagus sylvatica), all the same age. There are also parts of an ash-beech forest with the rather rare wild garlic.

The water of the stream is pure and particularly rich in calcium carbonate. When it comes into contact with the atmospheric air, carbonic acid escapes from the water, precipitating this calcium carbonate. The porous limestone formed is known as tufa and is an exceptional phenomenon in the Brussels-Capital Region.

Depending on the subsoil, Laerbeek Wood has a typical flora. One can find wild garlic, forest anemones and some bluebells. On the calcareous soil, in addition to wild garlic and anemones, one can find may bells, primroses and moneywort. Laerbeek Wood is also an important feeding ground for several species of bats, including the big-eared bat and the rare mop bat.

== Expansion of the Brussels Ring ==
=== History ===
The current Brussels Ring between the Groot-Bijgaarden junction and the Strombeek-Bever junction was built for the 1958 Brussels World's Fair (Expo 58). The Strombeek-Bever and Groot-Bijgaarden interchanges were not completed until the mid-1980s. Between 1995 and 2001, the N9 was also given a new (freeway) route and a renovated slip road (slip road complex 10 Zellik), with the ring road between the Groot-Bijgaarden junction and the forest being widened. New bridges were built over the railway line 60 and the N9 was given a half-cloverleaf connection with the ring road. This widening ended abruptly before the highway passed Laerbeek Wood, creating a bottleneck for traffic.

=== Expansion and protest ===
Plans for further expansion were initiated by the Flemish government in 2008. Fears arose, however, that 5 hectares (12 acres) of the protected Laerbeek Wood would have to disappear for this purpose. The environmental movement and the municipality of Jette protested against the plans of the Flemish government.

=== Bypass ===
However, the social cost-benefit analysis (SCBA) commissioned by the Flemish government in 2013 also examined a variant in which Laerbeek Wood would be spared by creating a bypass on the north side of the current ring road. The additional costs would be minimal. The current inner ring road near Laerbeek Wood would be converted into a parallel road to the east, while the current outer ring road (to the west, Groot-Bijgaarden junction) would be converted into a main road to the east. A new outer ring road (main road and parallel road) would then be built north of the current ring road.

In March 2016, the Flemish government decided to go for the basic project with a bypass near Laerbeek Wood. This will also include an ecoduct with pedestrian and bicycle connections. Previously, the Agency for Nature and Forests announced that it had purchased 26 hectares (64 acres) of agricultural land on the other side of the bypass with the intention to start planting a new forest there in 2028.

== Gallery ==
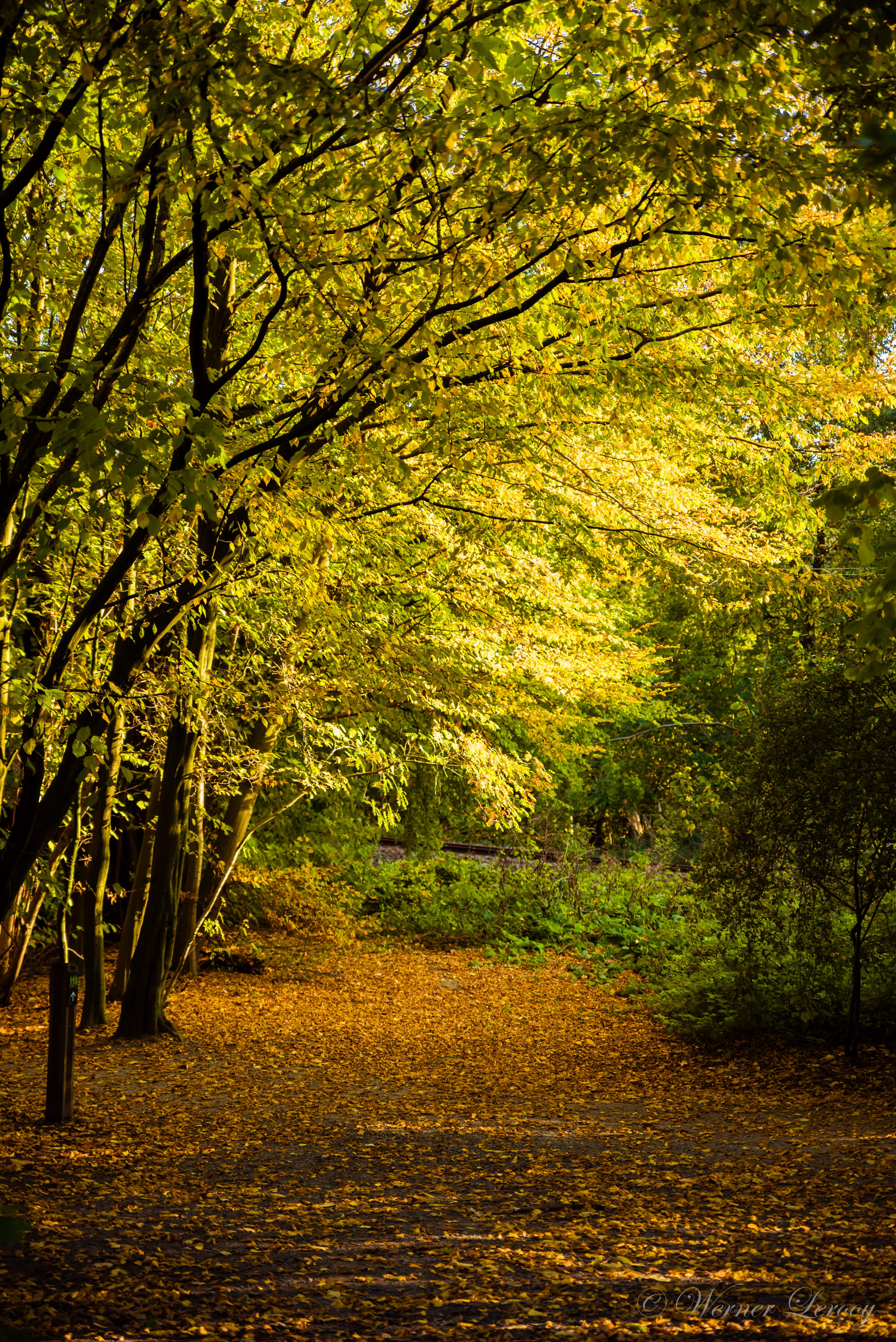
Autumn colours in Laerbeek Wood

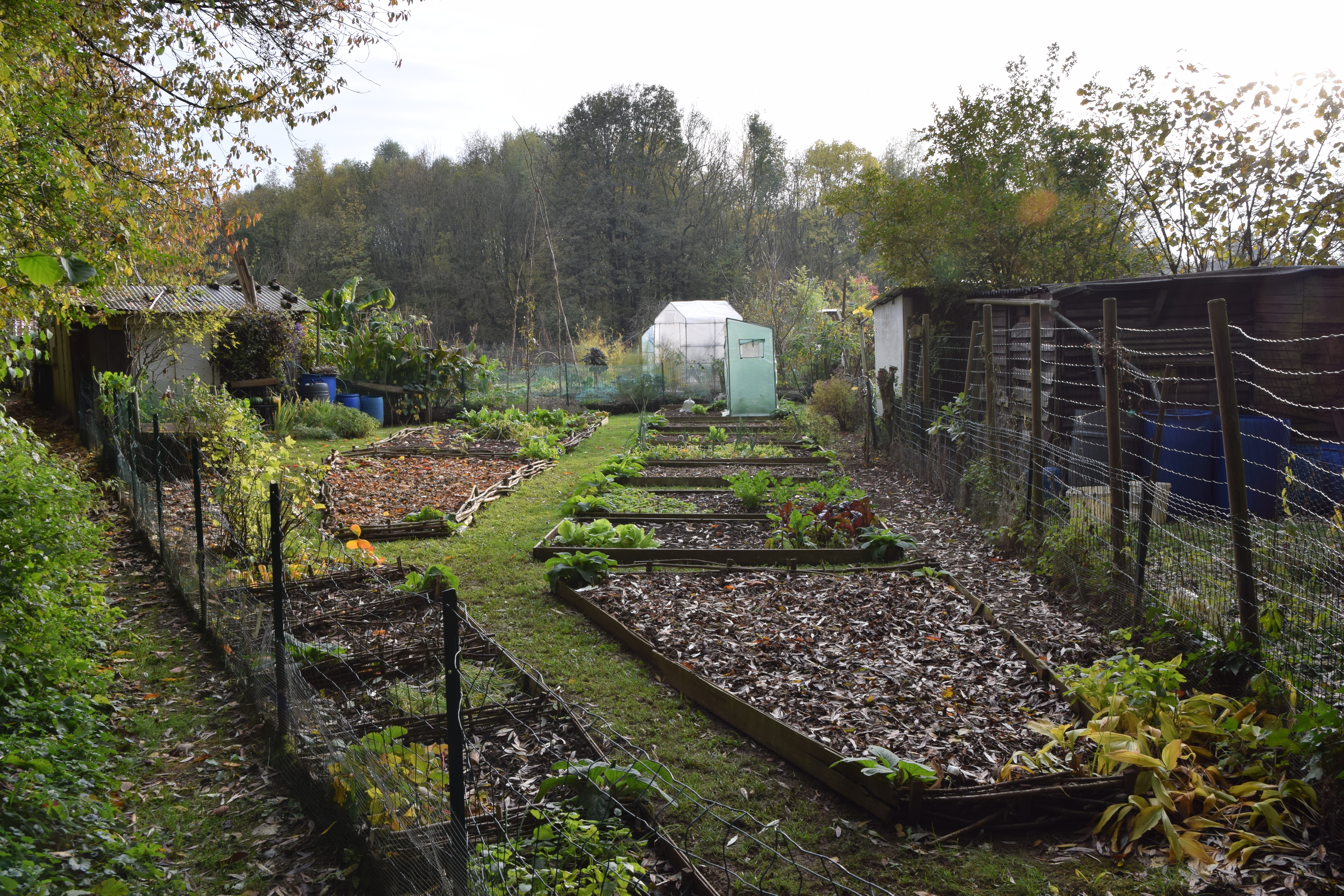
Public gardens on the edge of Laerbeek Wood

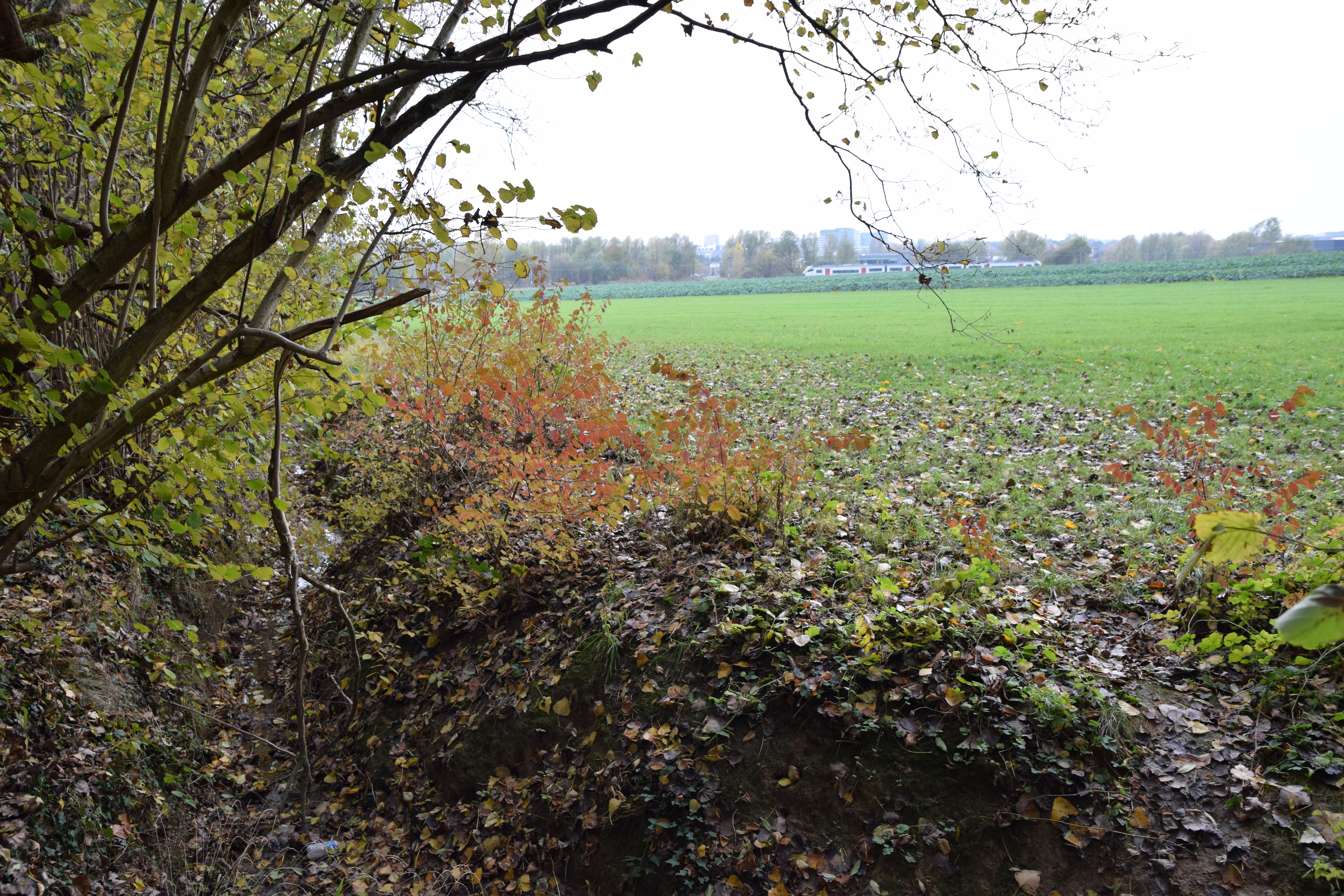
Laerbeek Wood with field and railroad in the distance
