= Natura 2000 =

Network of protected areas

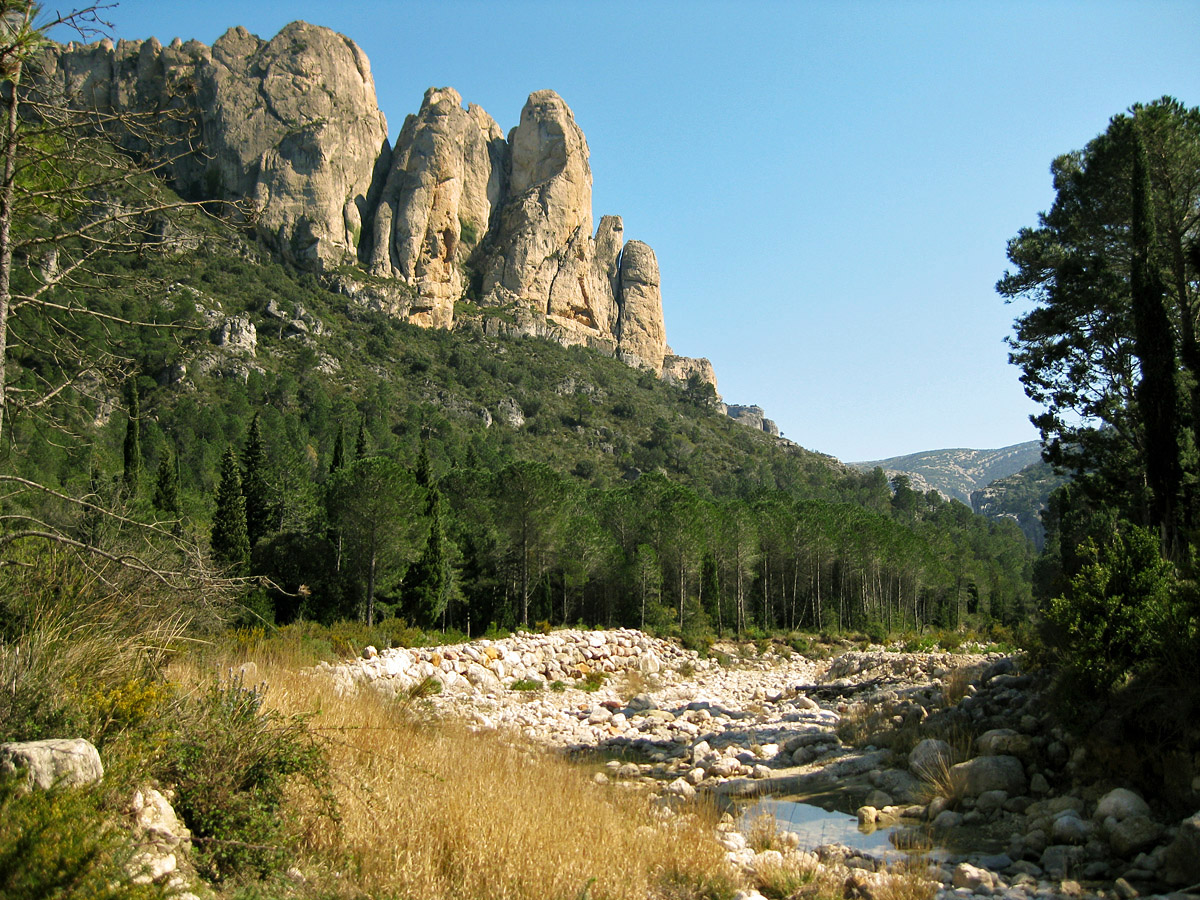
- Natural protected area of Els Ports
- Founded: 1992
- Type: Network of nature protection areas
- Region served: European Union
- Website: environment.ec.europa.eu/topics/nature-and-biodiversity/natura-2000_en

Natura 2000 is a network of nature protection areas in the territory of the European Union. It is made up of Special Areas of Conservation and Special Protection Areas designated under the Habitats Directive and the Birds Directive, respectively. The network includes both terrestrial and Marine Protected Areas.

The Natura 2000 network covered more than 18% of the European Union's land area and more than 7% of its marine area in 2022.

== History ==
In May 1992, the governments of the European Communities adopted legislation designed to protect the most seriously threatened habitats and species across Europe. The Habitats Directive complements the Birds Directive adopted in 1979, and together they make up the Natura 2000 network of protected areas.

The Birds Directive requires the establishment of Special Protection Areas for birds. The Habitats Directive similarly requires Sites of Community Importance which upon the agreement of the European Commission become Special Areas of Conservation to be designated for species other than birds, and for habitat types (e.g. particular types of forest, grasslands, wetlands, etc.). Together, Special Protection Areas and Special Areas of Conservation form the Natura 2000 network of protected areas.

The Natura 2000 network is the EU contribution to the "Emerald network" of Areas of Special Conservation Interest set up under the Bern Convention on the conservation of European wildlife and natural habitats. Natura 2000 is also a key contribution to the Program of Work of Protected Areas of the Convention on Biological Diversity.

As a prerequisite for joining the EU, accession states have to submit proposals for Natura 2000 sites meeting the same criteria as EU member states. Some new member states have large areas which qualify to be protected under the directives, and implementation has not always been simple.

The Natura 2000 sites are selected by member states and the European Commission following strictly scientific criteria according to the two directives mentioned above. The Special Protection Areas are designated directly by each EU member state, while the Special Areas of Conservation follow a more elaborate process: each EU member state must compile a list of the best wildlife areas containing the habitats and species listed in the Habitats Directive; this list must then be submitted to the European Commission, after which an evaluation and selection process on European level will take place in order to become a Natura 2000 site.

The Habitats Directive divides the EU territory into nine biogeographic regions, each with its own ecological coherence. Natura 2000 sites are selected according to the conditions in each biogeographical region; thus selected sites represent species and habitat types under similar natural conditions across a suite of countries.

Each Natura 2000 site has a unique identification form called a standard data form. This form is used as a legal reference when assessing the management of the species and habitats through the concept of favourable conservation status. The Natura 2000 Viewer is a tool to explore the network and gives access to every standard data form.

== Current status ==
As of 2017, Natura 2000 protected 27,312 sites with a terrestrial area of 787,606 km^{2} (304,096 sq mi) (around 18 percent of land of the EU countries) and marine area of 360,350 km^{2} (139,130 sq mi), and was considered almost complete in the EU terrestrial environment. The process of designation has not always been smooth as the infringement procedures against member states show. While designation of sites may be near complete, the management and enforcement of protection on sites is less advanced and many sites lack management plans. Natura 2000 faced criticism from developers, farmers and politicians who fear that the conservation of habitats and species places a brake on development.

In 2013, there were 251,564 km^{2} (97,129 sq mi) designated as Natura 2000 in the marine environment. The network in marine areas is not considered complete and acknowledged by the Commission as a "key challenge for EU biodiversity policy in the coming years".

Natura 2000 sites can vary considerably in character. They are not strictly protected in terms of how they are allowed to be used by people. Many sites are farmed, forested and some are even in urban areas. Other areas are much wilder. The European Commission developed guidelines on the relation between Natura 2000 and wild areas which are thought to make up around 13% of the network. This was in response to a report by Members of the European Parliament in 2009 which called for further protection of Europe's wilderness.

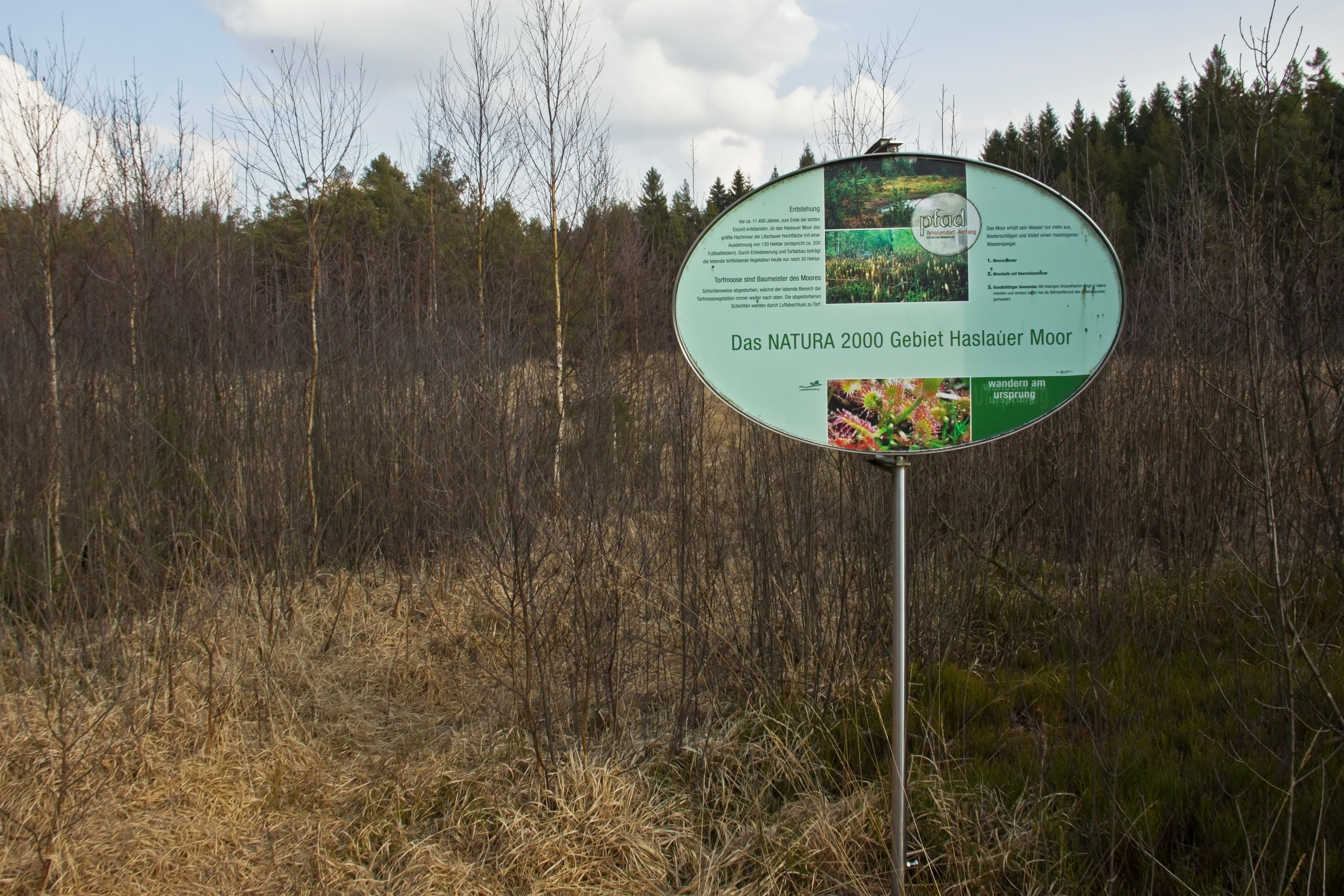
Sign identifying a "Natura 2000 area" (Haslauer Moor nature reserve) in Austria

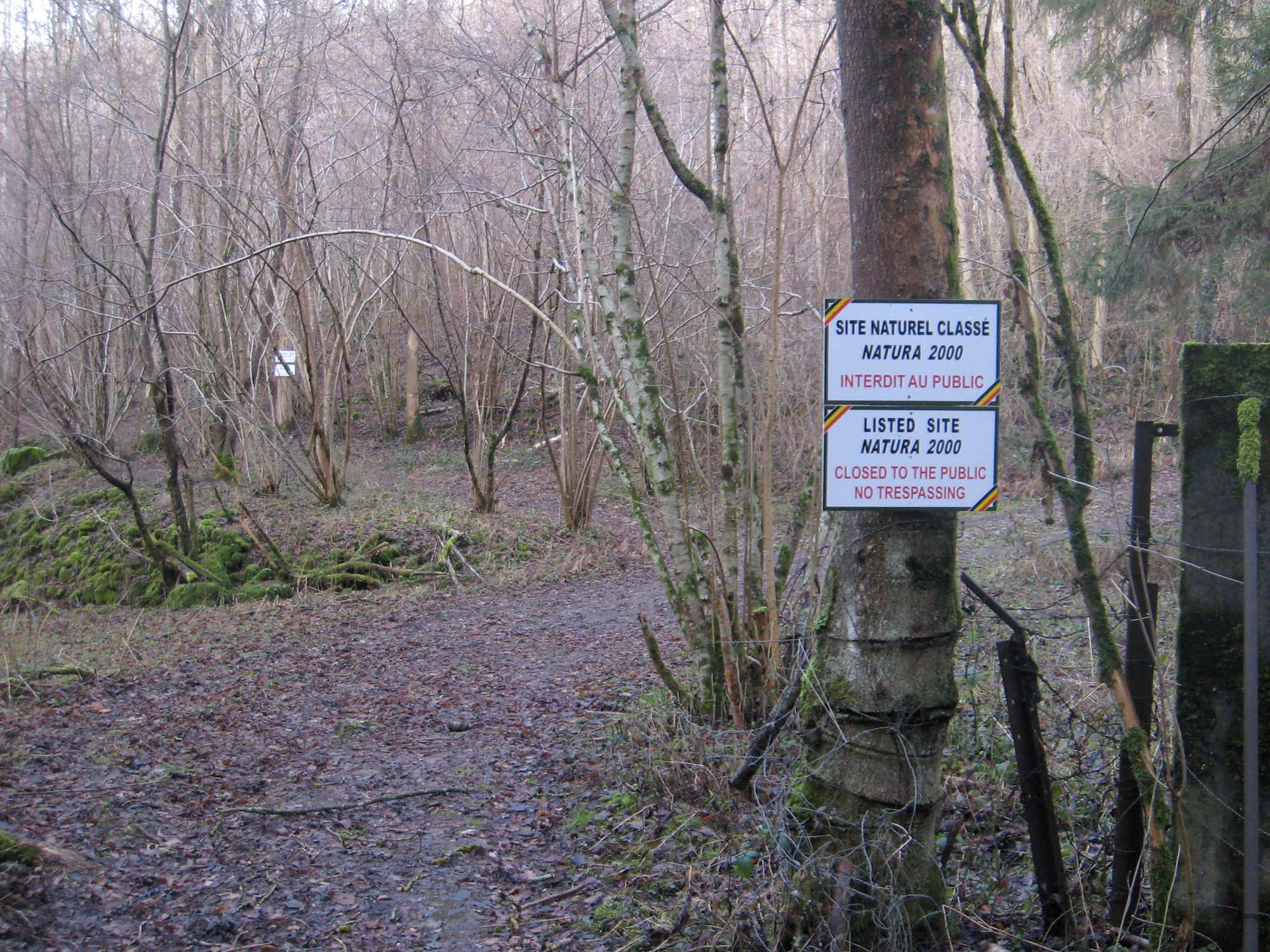
Sign identifying a Natura 2000 site in Belgium

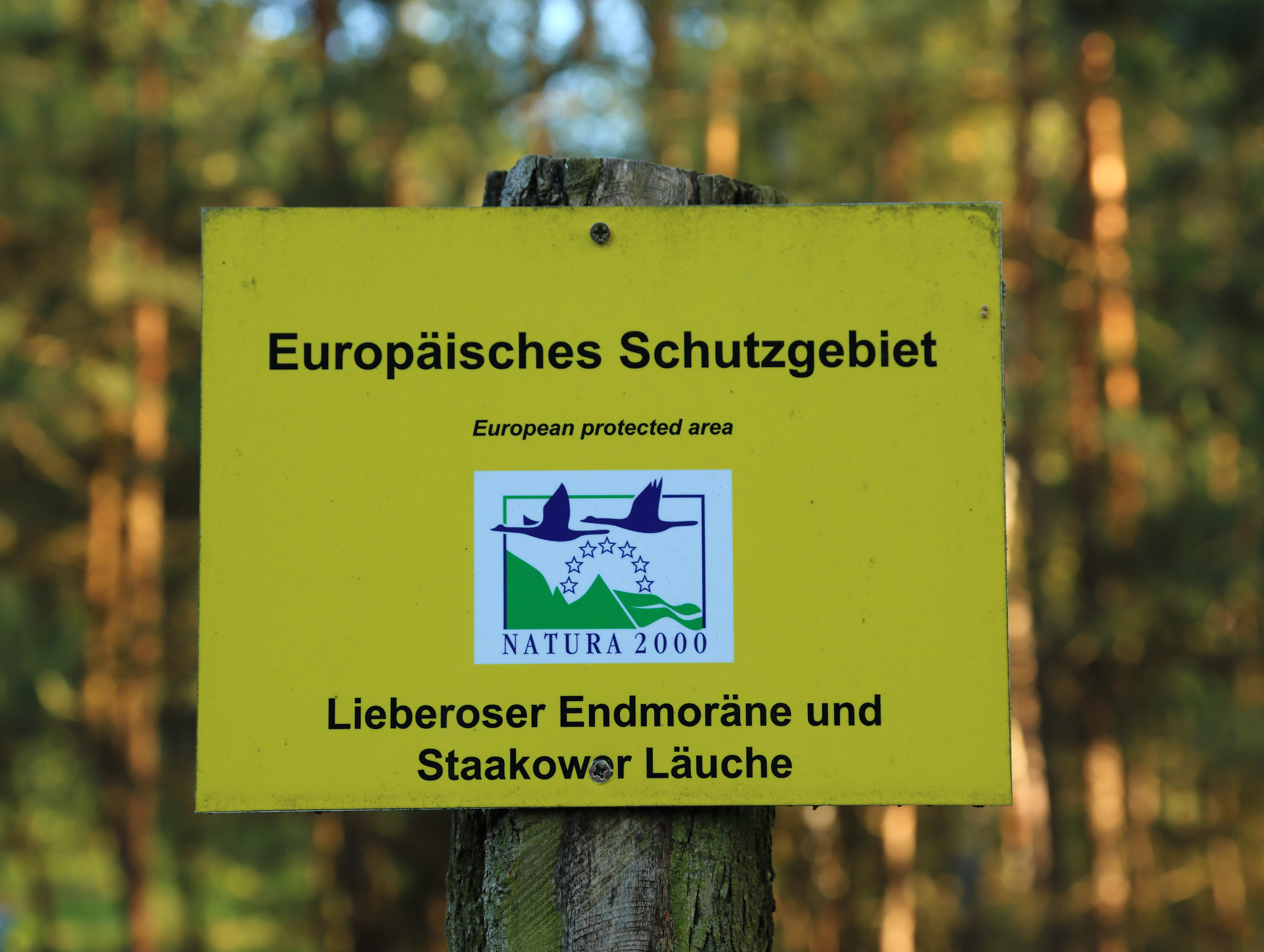
Sign identifying a "European protected area" (Special Area of Conservation Lieberoser Endmoräne und Staakower Läuche) in Germany

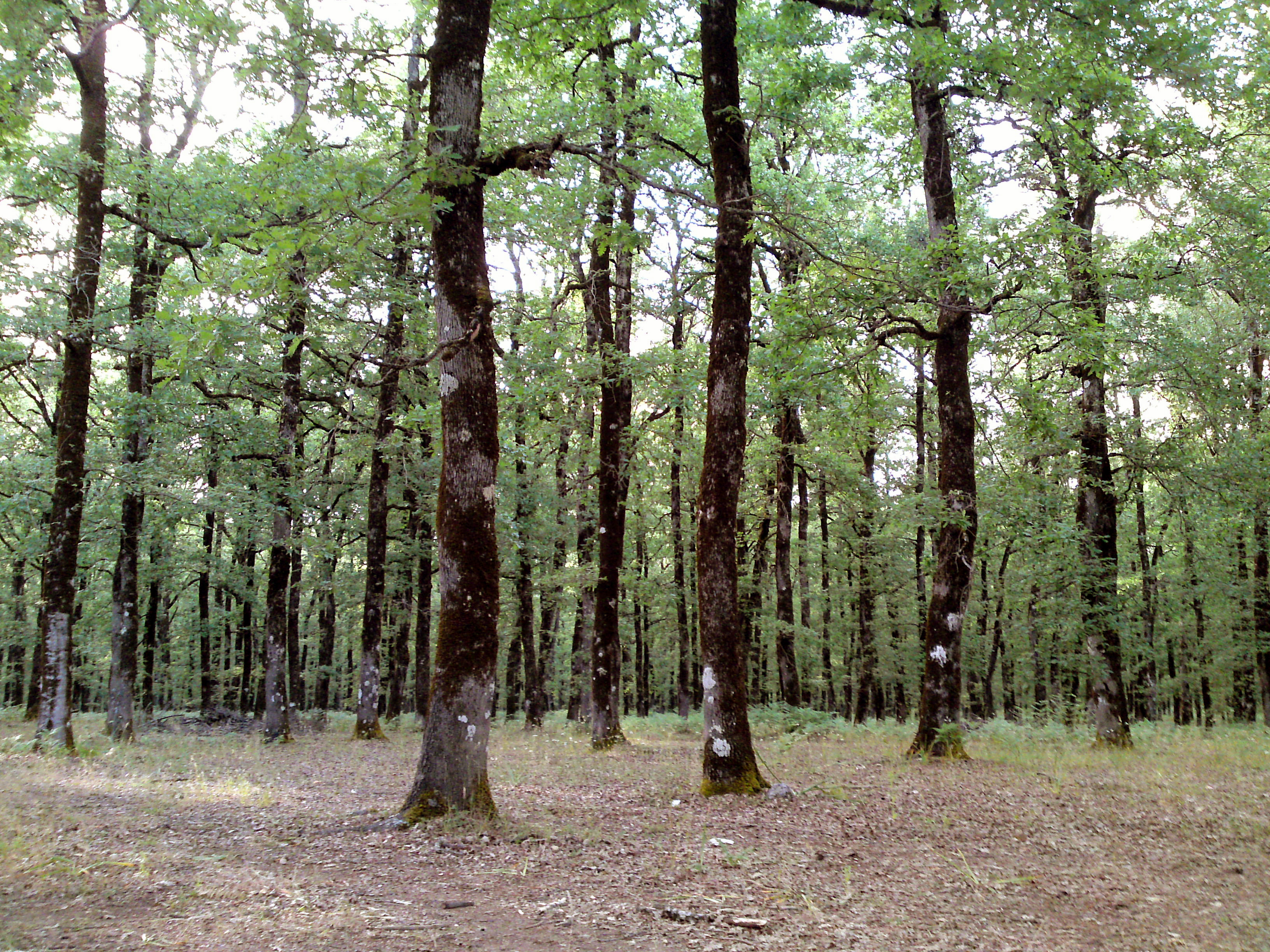
The Foloi oak forest in Greece is a Natura 2000 site.

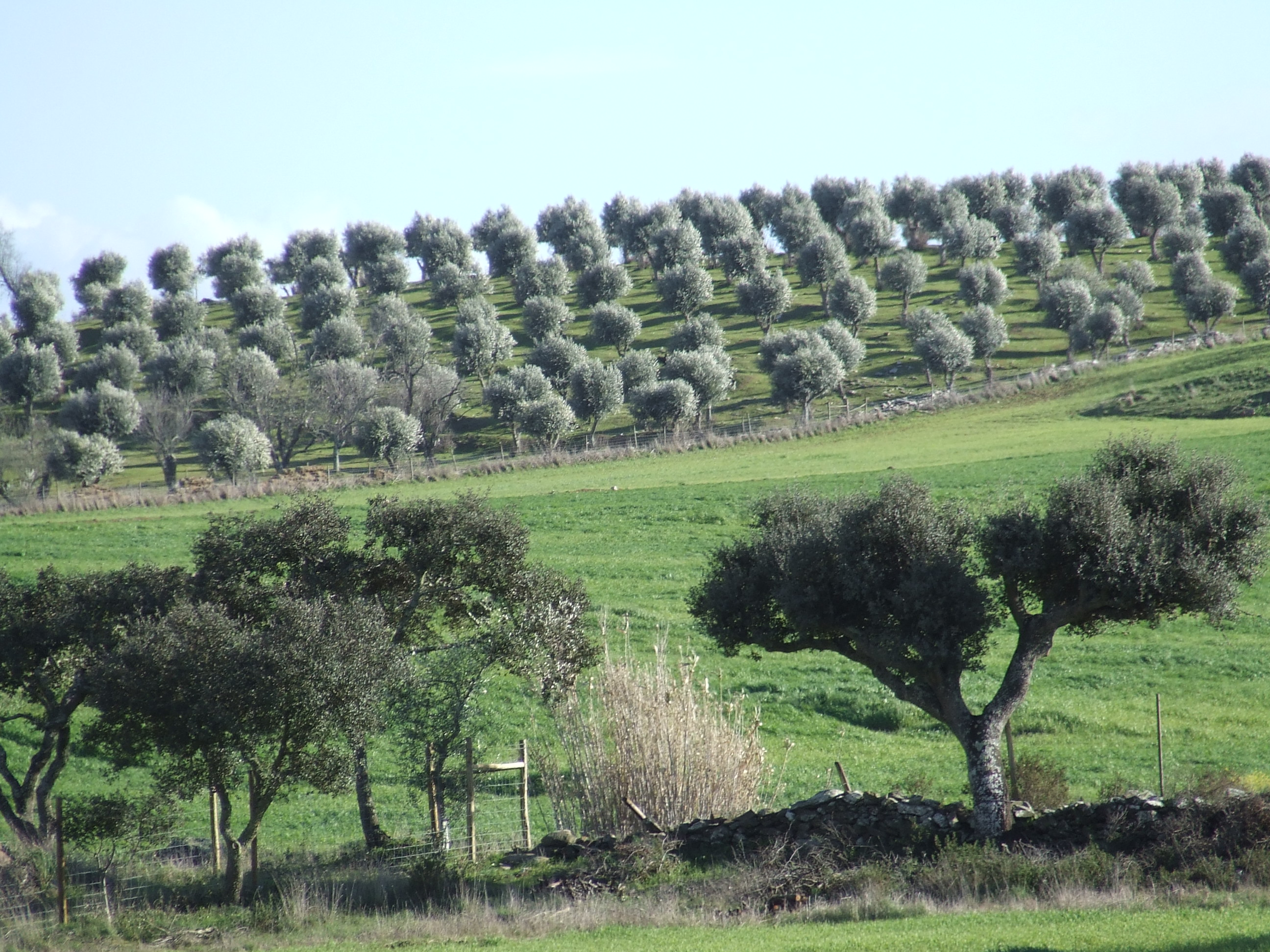
Castro Verde, Natura 2000 site in Portugal

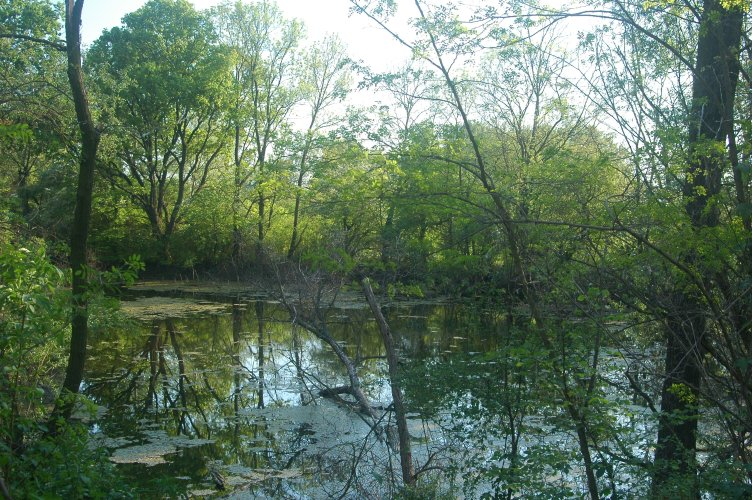
Natura 2000 locality in Slovakia

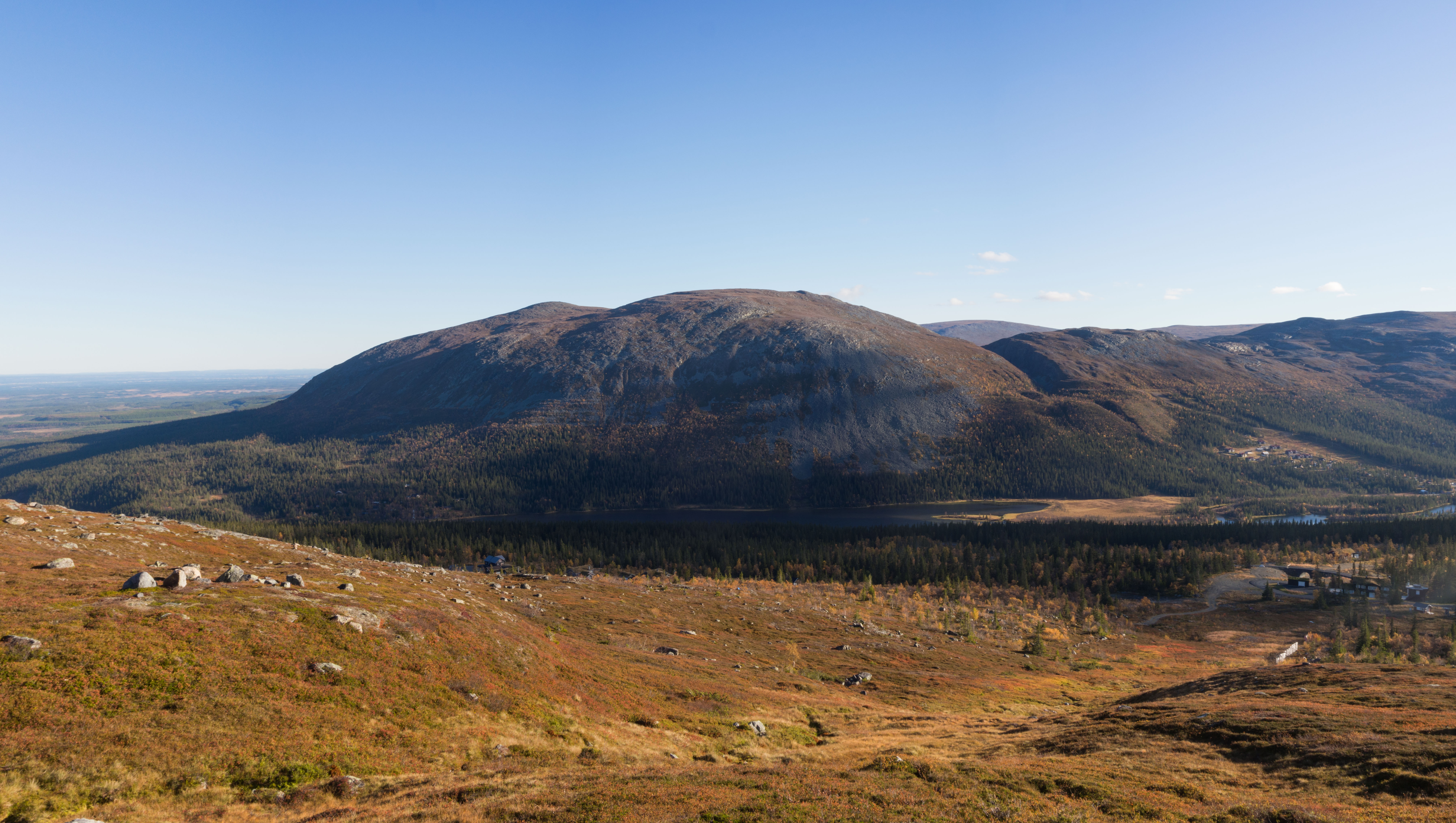
Bastudalen Nature Reserve in Sweden, a Natura 2000 site

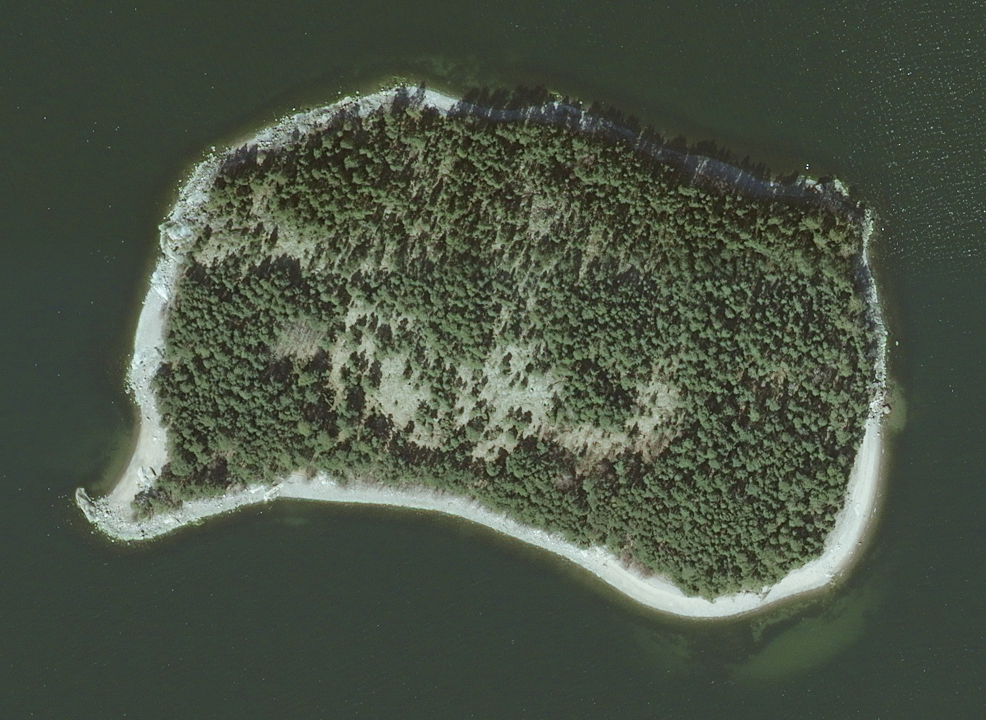
An aerial photography of the Omenainen island, Natura 2000 site in Finland

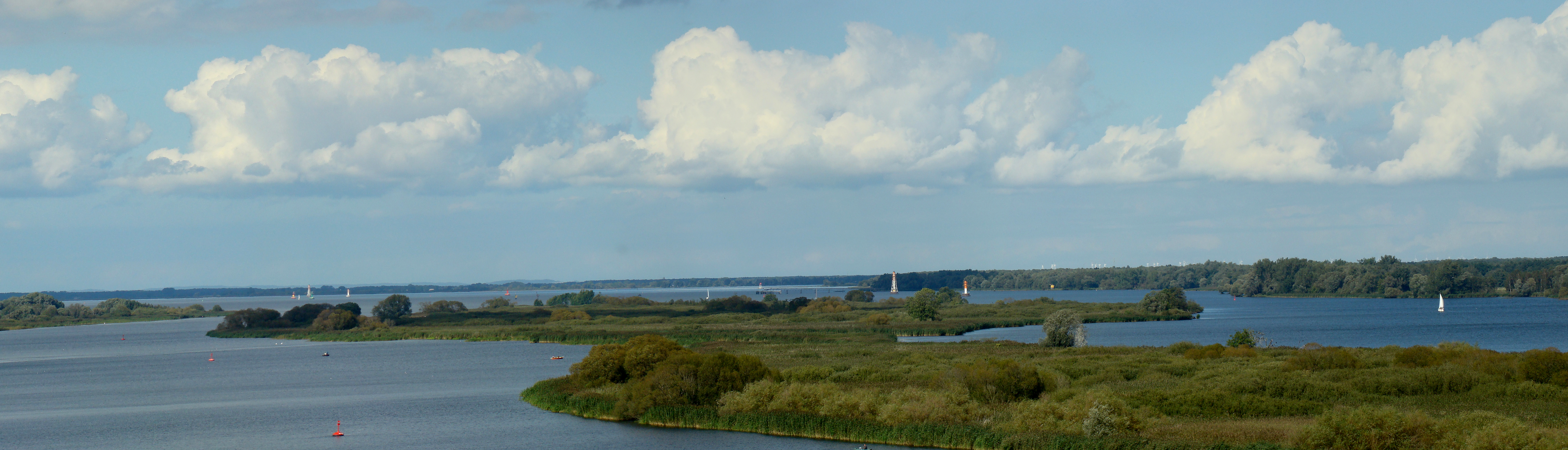
Natura 2000 locality in Police, Poland (estuary of Oder and Szczecin Lagoon)

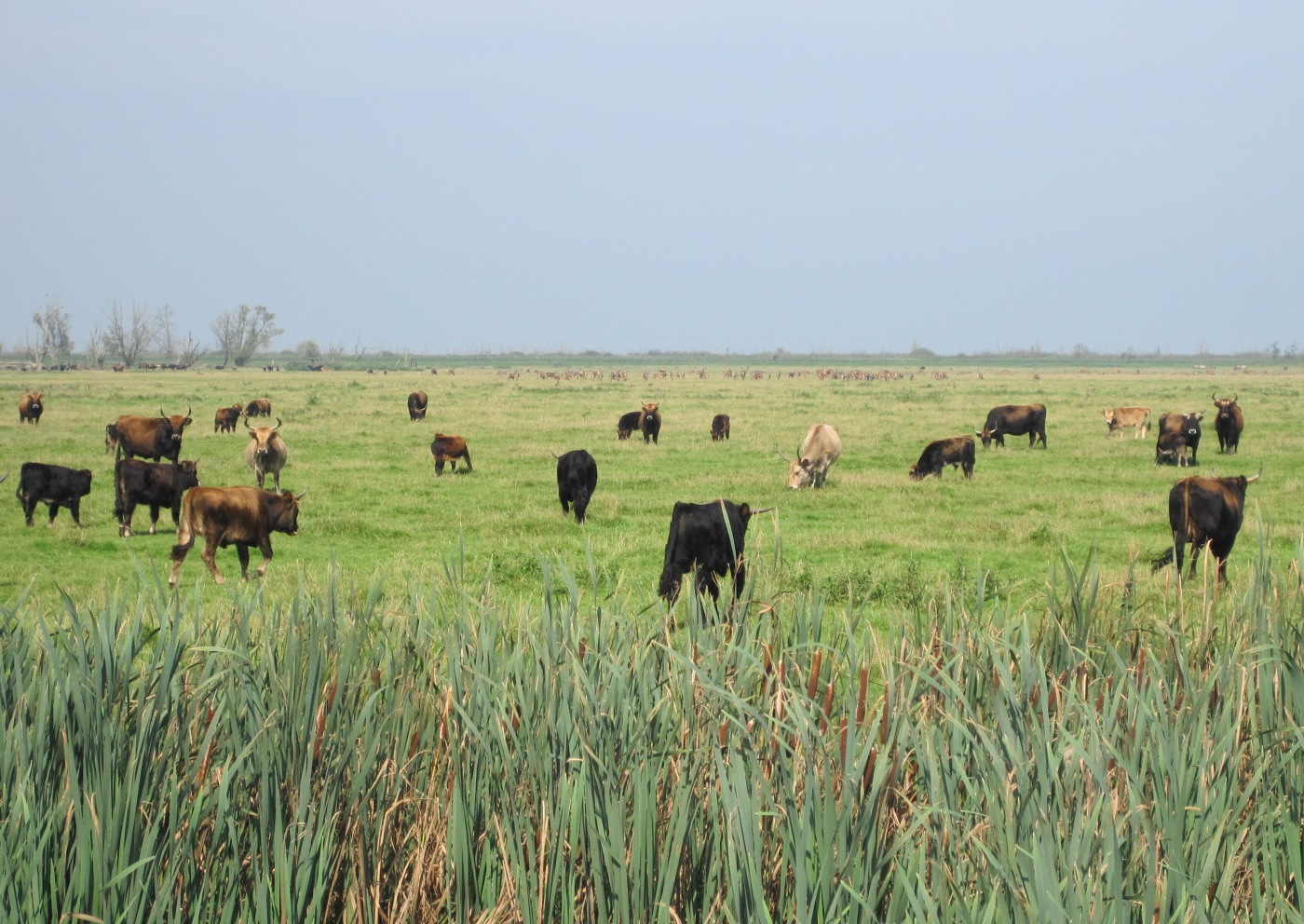
The Oostvaardersplassen is a Natura 2000 site in the Netherlands.

== Raising awareness ==
The Natura 2000 network is not well known among European Union citizens; only 11% of citizens knew what it was in 2013. As part of the EU Biodiversity Strategy, the European Commission committed to raise awareness about the network and biodiversity in general with the public.

=== Natura 2000 Day ===
In order to raise awareness about the Natura 2000 network, 21 May has been designated “Natura 2000 Day”. This precedes “International Day for Biological Diversity” on 22 May. The initiative came from SEO/BirdLife who sought and received funding from the EU LIFE+ programme in order to improve the knowledge of this network.

In 2013, the first Natura 2000 day took place with the aim to raise awareness of citizens about the importance of Natura 2000 network in their lives. Since then, every May 21 and the weeks before, awareness actions take place all over Europe. For example, in 2014, school children and politicians across the EU were encouraged to make a butterfly gesture and post photos on social media to raise awareness.

=== The Natura 2000 Award ===
The Natura 2000 Award was launched by the European Commission in 2013, with the first prizes awarded on Natura 2000 Day in 2014. The annual Award aims to raise awareness about the Natura 2000 network, showcase excellence and encourage networking between people working on Natura 2000 sites.

It awards prizes to those working on the management of or to raise awareness about Natura 2000 in five award categories: Conservation; Socio-Economic Benefits; Communication; Reconciling Interests and Perceptions; Cross-Border Cooperation and Networking. In its first year, winners were selected from Bulgaria, Romania, Czech Republic, Belgium and Spain.

== Controversy ==
The Natura 2000 legislation, notably with its habitats-test (or: habitats assessment, Article 6 of the Habitats Directive), dates back to the days climate change was not an issue and the concept of ecosystem services had not been well developed. Hence, in international law literature Kistenkas raised the question the habitats assessment was originally not designed for striking a balance of all relevant ecosystem services or to involve climate change into the assessment. Although well protecting nature conservation objectives, a rethinking of the habitats assessment might be necessary in the light of a new climate law as part of e.g. the European Green Deal.

In European law literature Borgstrom and Kistenkas have discussed some possible future incompatibilities of the Natura 2000 habitats-test with novel EU green infrastructure policies.

In the late 2010s the habitats assessment was at the basis of the nitrogen crisis in the Netherlands as the EU Court (C-293/17 and C-294/17, ECLI:EU:C:2018:882) ruled on agriculture nearby Natura 2000 sites.

In some other member states, such as Bulgaria, there was criticism a project had not been well communicated in advance. This led to construction in the Kaliakra zone of Bulgaria, including wind turbines and a golf course. Land owners have then been told they may not use their land in certain ways, otherwise non-compliance procedures would be used against Bulgaria. This led to protests by the land-owners.

== See also ==
- Ecological network
- Emerald Network of Ukraine – Ukraine's equivalent of Natura 2000
- Forêts et étangs du Perche
- Raspaillebos
- Dieleghem Wood
- Laerbeek Wood
- Agri-environmental measures
- Sätra Nature Reserve
