= Sätra Nature Reserve =

Nature reserve in Uppsala, Sweden

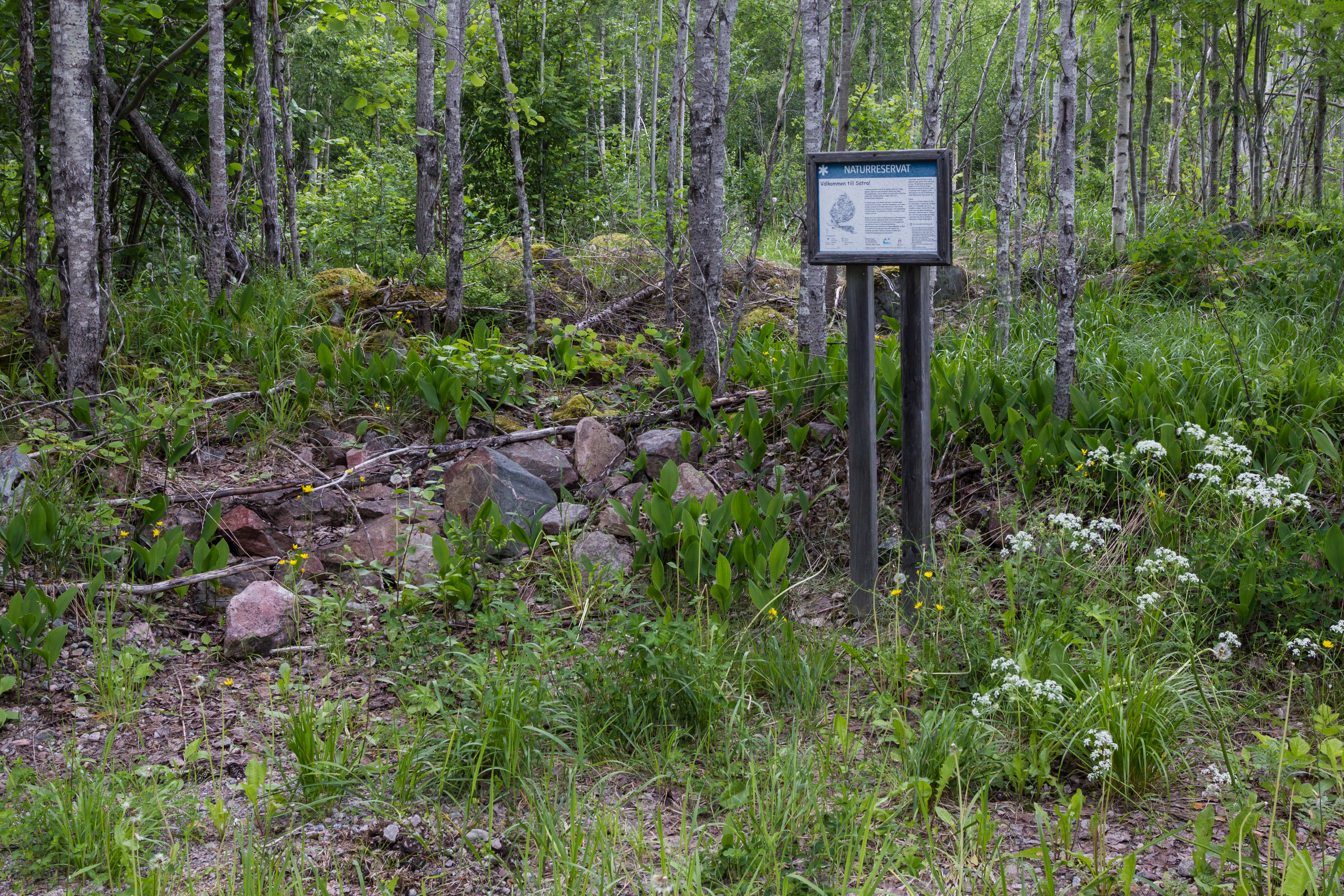

- Location within Uppsala
- Location: Sweden
- Coordinates: 60°29′01″N 17°32′33″E

Sätra Nature Reserve (Swedish: Sätra naturreservat) is a nature reserve in northern Uppsala County in Sweden.

Sätra Nature Reserve consists of an area of old-growth forest dominated by spruce. The forest has been untouched since at least the 1860s. A number of orchids are known to grow in the area, including Cypripedium calceolus and broad-leaved helleborine. The nature reserve is part of the EU-wide Natura 2000-network.
