= Dieleghem Abbey =

Former abbey in Jette, Belgium

- Abbaye de Dieleghem (French); Abdij van Dielegem (Dutch)
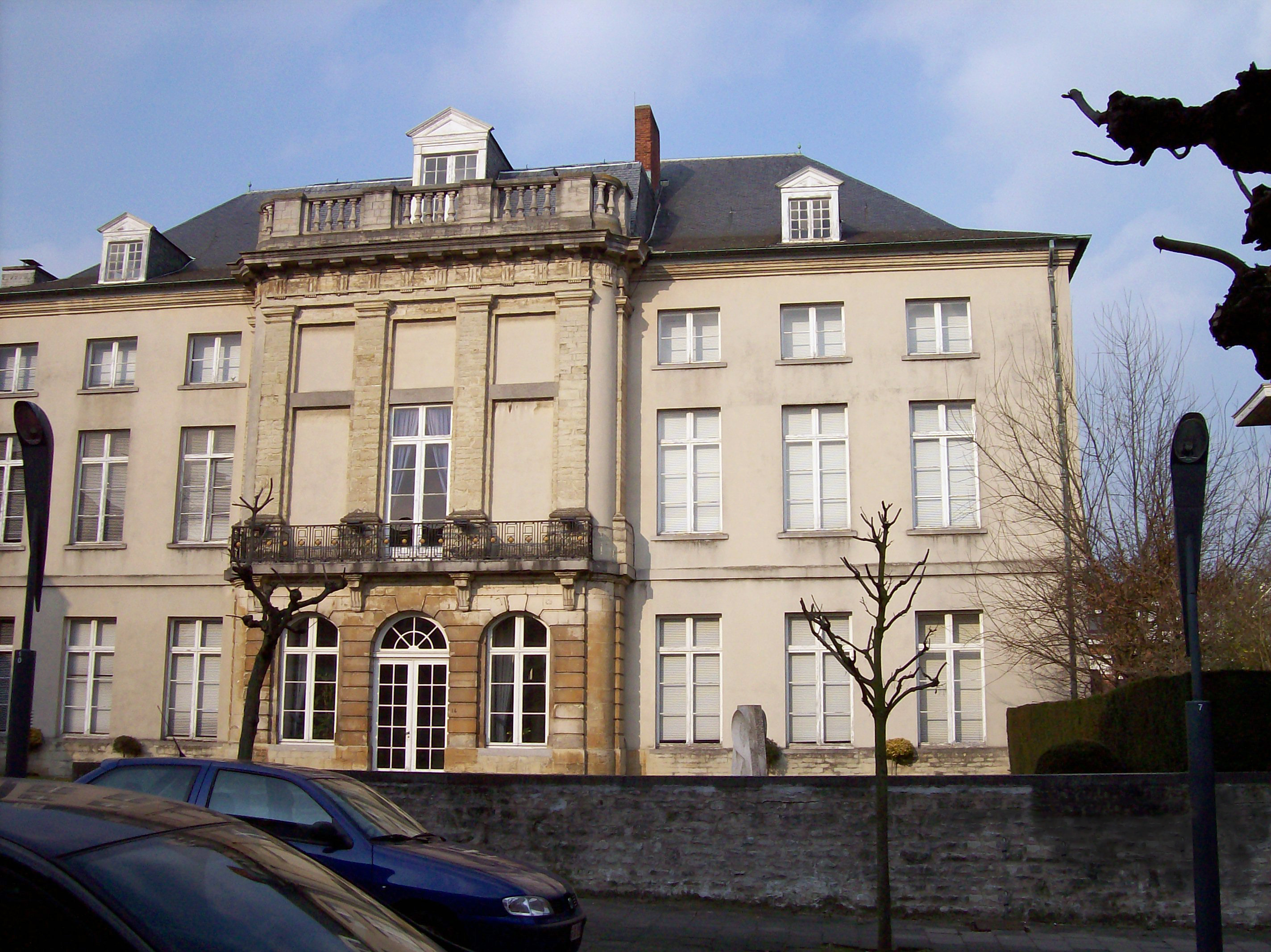
- The abbot's mansion is the only remaining building of Dieleghem Abbey
- Interactive map of the Dieleghem Abbey area

General information
- Type: Abbey
- Location: Jette, Brussels-Capital Region, Belgium
- Coordinates: 50°53′02″N 4°19′10″E
- Closed: Deconsecrated in 1796

Dieleghem Abbey (French: Abbaye de Dieleghem) or Dielegem Abbey (Dutch: Abdij van Dielegem) is a former abbey located in the Brussels municipality of Jette, Belgium. It was abolished in 1796.

== History ==
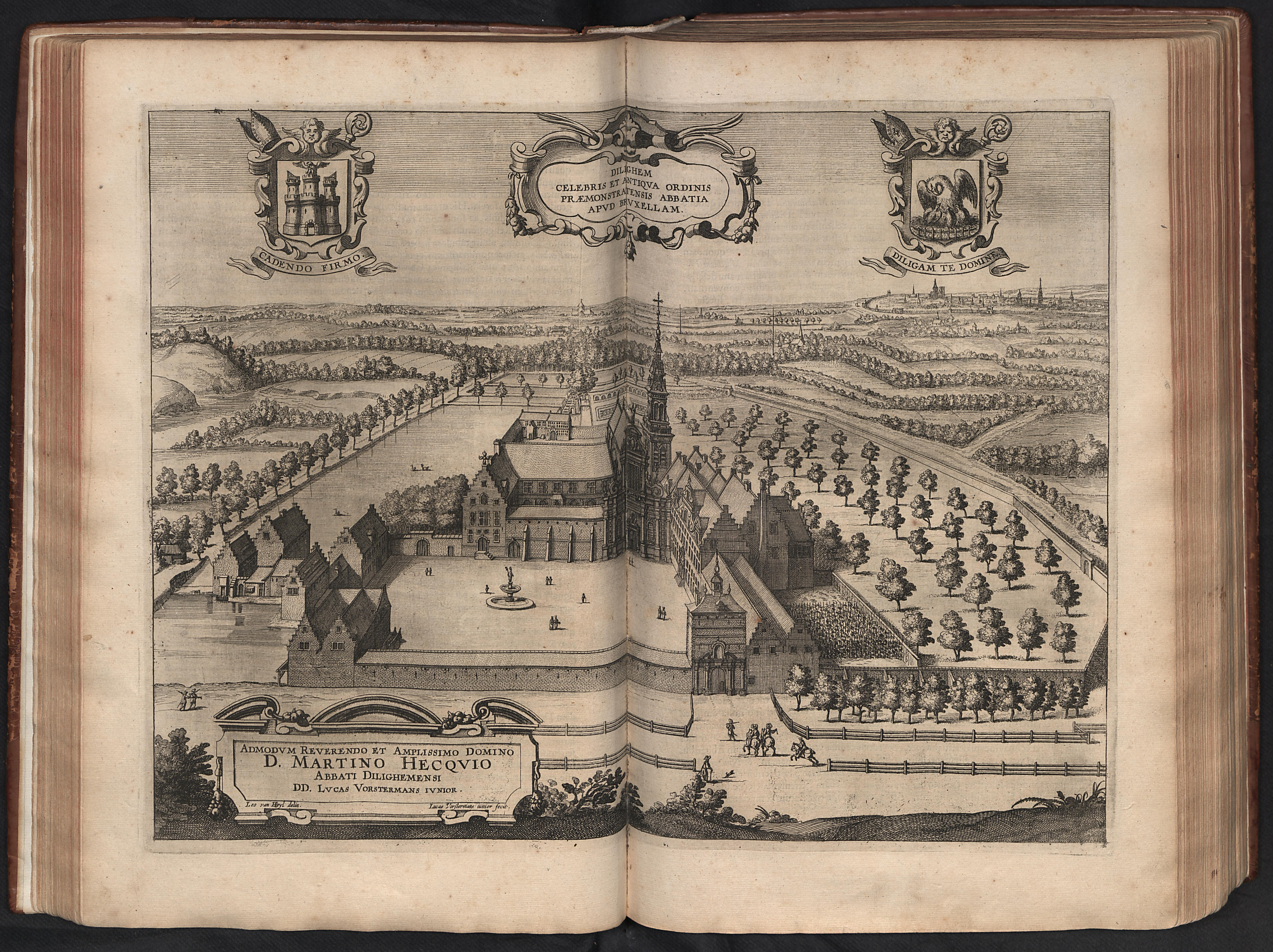
Dieleghem Abbey, engraving by Lucas Vorsterman II, published in Sanderus, Chorographia Sacra Brabantiae (1659)

The oldest reference to the abbey dates from 1095, when the Bishop of Cambrai issued a charter in its favour. Initially administered by Augustinian canons, in 1140, the abbey's monks switched to the rules of the Premonstratensian order. In the 13th century, the abbey now called Dieleghem possessed half of the municipality's territory and played an important social and economic role until the French Revolution. The abbots, mitred from 1532, sat in the States of Brabant, the representation of the three estates (nobility, clergy and commoners) to the court of the Duke of Brabant.

In November 1796, the canons regular were evicted and deported to an island off the shores of Brittany, France. Dieleghem Abbey was looted and subsequently destroyed, sparing only the abbot's residence. Other abbeys in Flanders, like Afflighem, Grimbergen and Groot-Bijgaarden, shared a similar fate.

The abbey and the site were classified as a historic monument on 3 February 1953. The abbot's former residence now houses the collections of the museum of the County of Jette.

== See also ==
- Laerbeek Wood
- Roman Catholicism in Belgium
- Neoclassical architecture in Belgium
- History of Brussels
- Culture of Belgium
- Belgium in the long nineteenth century
