= Dieleghem Wood =

Forest in Jette, Belgium

Dieleghem Wood French: Bois de Dieleghem Dutch: Dielegembos
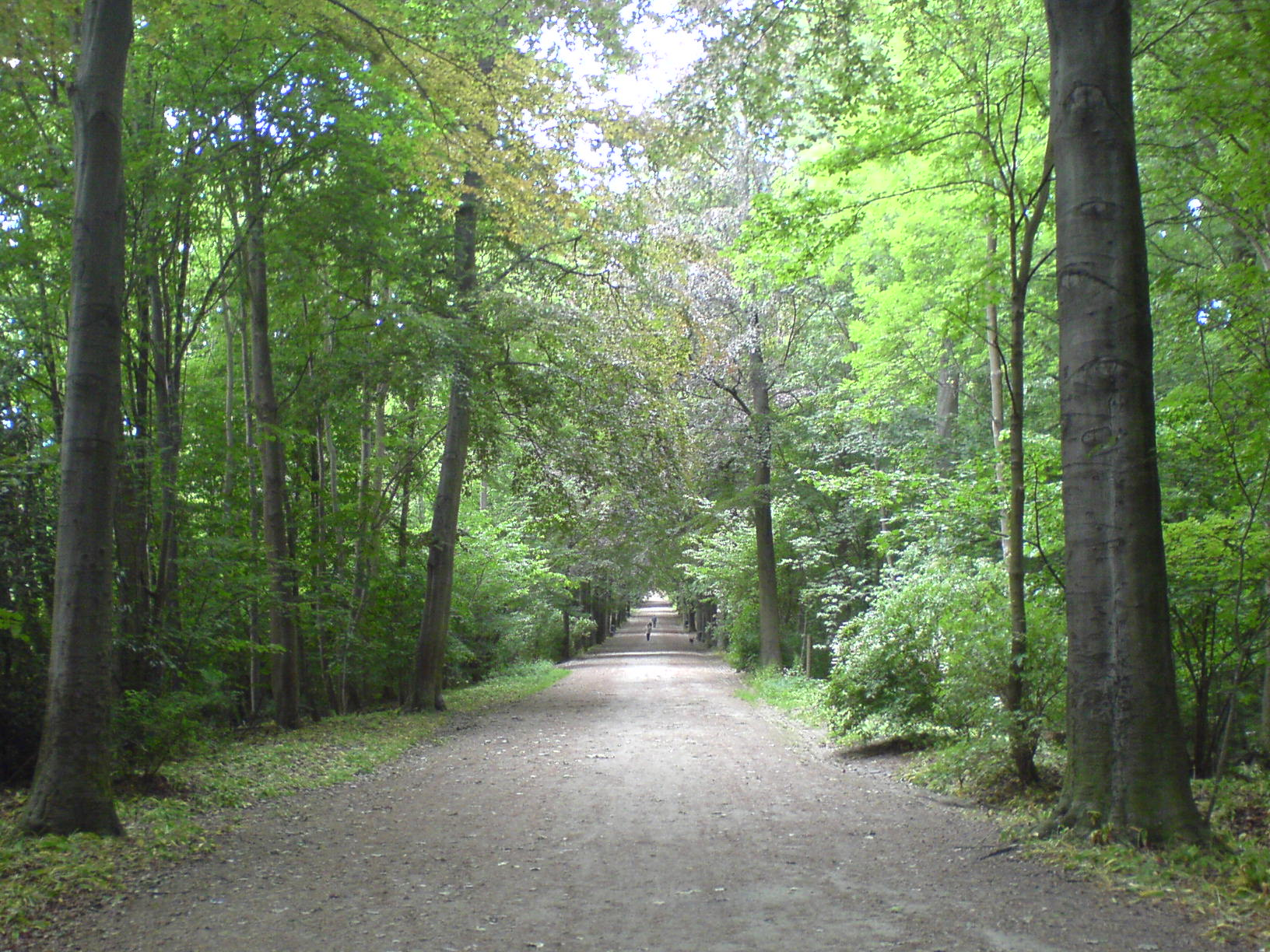

- Location within Belgium
- Interactive map of Dieleghem Wood

Geography
- Location: Jette, Brussels-Capital Region, Belgium
- Coordinates: 50°53′15″N 4°19′24″E
- Area: 9 ha (22 acres)

Dieleghem Wood (French: Bois de Dieleghem, pronounced [bwa də dilɡɛm]) or Dielegem Wood (Dutch: Dielegembos, pronounced [ˈdiləɣɛmˌbɔs]) is a public forest in the municipality of Jette in Brussels, Belgium. It covers an area of 9 hectares (22 acres) and was acquired by the municipality in 1952. Along with the Poelbos and Laerbeek Wood, Dieleghem Wood is an integral part of the regional King Baudouin Park.

The forest is located between the Avenue Jean Joseph Crocq/Jean Joseph Crocqlaan, the Rue Bonaventure/Bonaventurestraat, the Avenue du Heymbosch/Heymboschlaan, the Avenue Henri Liebrecht/Henri Liebrechtlaan, and the Avenue Jacques Swartenbrouck/Jacques Swartenbroucklaan.

Dieleghem Wood has an exceptional biodiversity and is part of the Natura 2000 Special Protection Area in the Brussels-Capital Region.

== Description ==
There are several zones of trees within Dieleghem Wood: alders and poplars in the lower, humid areas; beech trees in the higher, dry areas; as well as shrubs. The forest is also home to ancient beech trees that are approximately 200 years old. A distinctive feature of this forest is the abundance of wild garlic, which covers the forest floor with a layer of flowers, especially around mid-May.

Brussels Environment is responsible for the management of the forest. The forest is under European protection as part of the Natura 2000 Habitat Directive Area "Forests and wetlands of the Molenbeek valley in the north-west of the Brussels region".
