= Ganshoren =

Municipality of the Brussels-Capital Region, Belgium

- Municipality
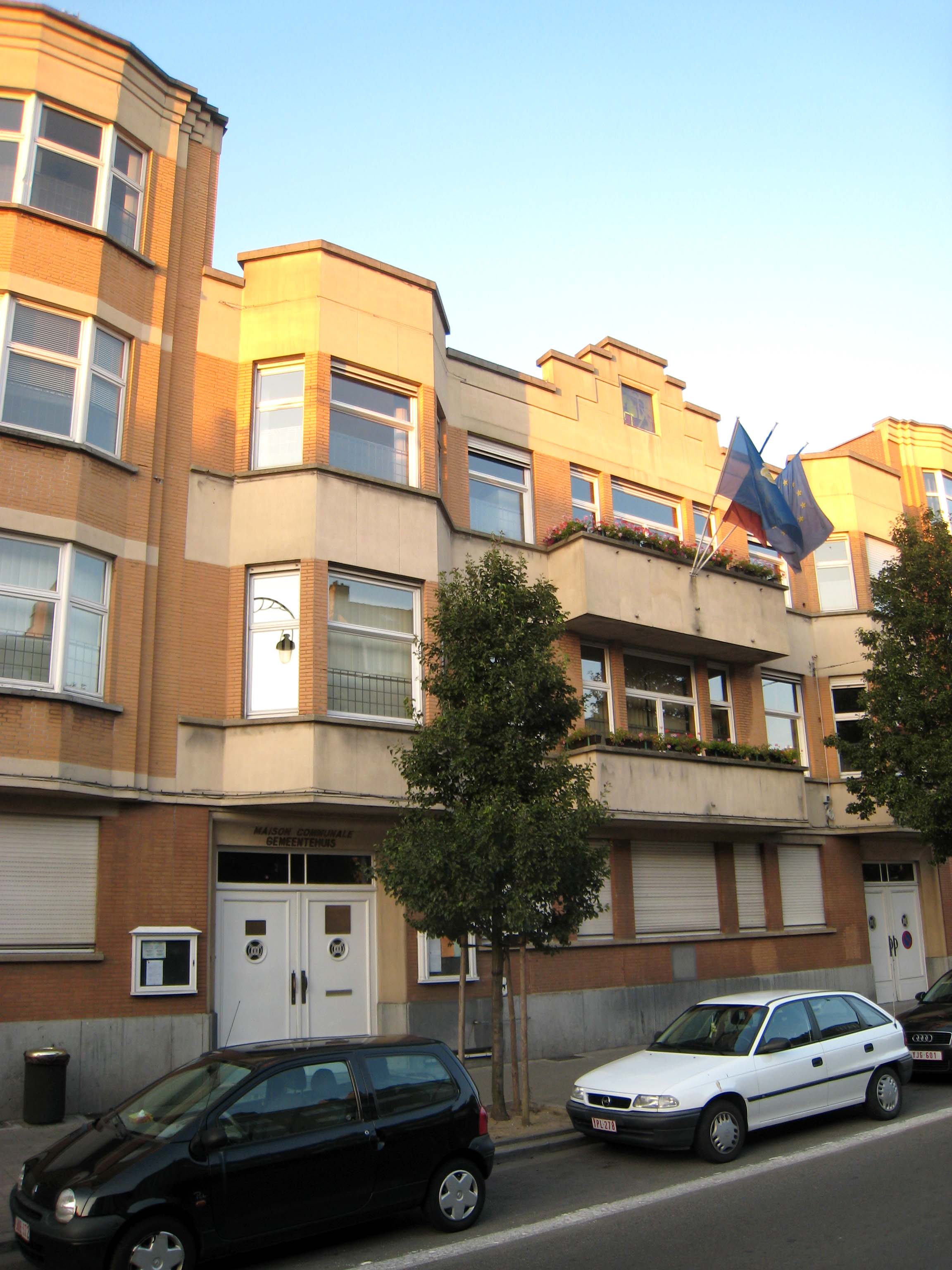
- Ganshoren's Municipal Hall

- Flag Coat of arms

- Ganshoren municipality in the Brussels-Capital Region
- Interactive map of Ganshoren
- Location in Belgium
- Coordinates: 50°52′N 04°19′E
- Country: Belgium
- Community: Flemish Community; French Community
- Region: Brussels-Capital
- Arrondissement: Brussels-Capital

Government
  - Mayor: Jean-Paul Van Laethem (Les Engagés)
  - Governing parties: Liste du Bourgmestre (Les Engagés), PS+Citoyens, DéFI

Area
  - Total: 2.44 km^{2} (0.94 sq mi)

Population (2020-01-01)
  - Total: 25,234
  - Density: 10,300/km^{2} (26,800/sq mi)
- Postal codes: 1083
- NIS code: 21008
- Area codes: 02
- Website: ganshoren.be/fr (in French) ganshoren.be/nl (in Dutch)

Ganshoren (French: [ɡansɔʁœn, -ʁɛn]; Dutch: [ˈɣɑnsˌɦoːrə(n)]) is one of the 19 municipalities of the Brussels-Capital Region, Belgium. Located in the north-western part of the region, it is bordered by Berchem-Sainte-Agathe, Jette, and Koekelberg, as well as the Flemish municipality of Asse. Like all municipalities in Brussels, it is officially bilingual (French–Dutch).

As of 1 January 2024, the municipality had a population of 25,564 inhabitants. The total area is 2.44 km^{2} (0.94 sq mi), which gives a population density of 10,487/km^{2} (27,160/sq mi).

== Main sights ==
- Rivieren Castle, whose origins go back to the 12th century, and its surrounding park, which are not open to the public.
- The Church of St. Martin, a Catholic parish church designed in modernist style by the architect Jean Gilson and built in 1970–71.
- The Hellinckx House, an early 20th-century (1910) Art Nouveau town house built for Alphonse Hellinckx, who later became mayor of Ganshoren.
- Ganshoren has a few green areas, including the Ganshoren Marsh.
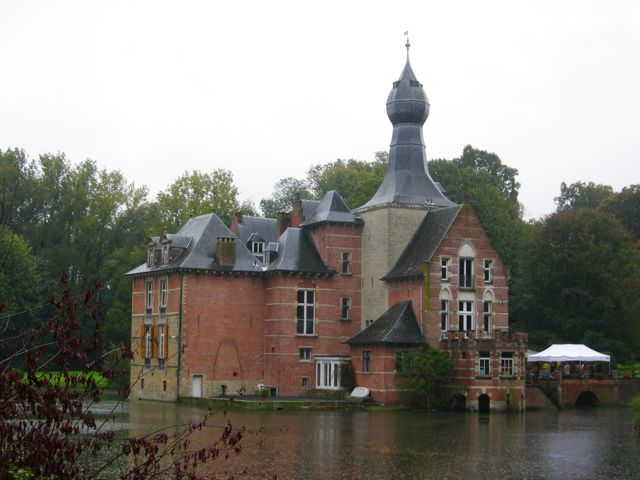
Rivieren Castle

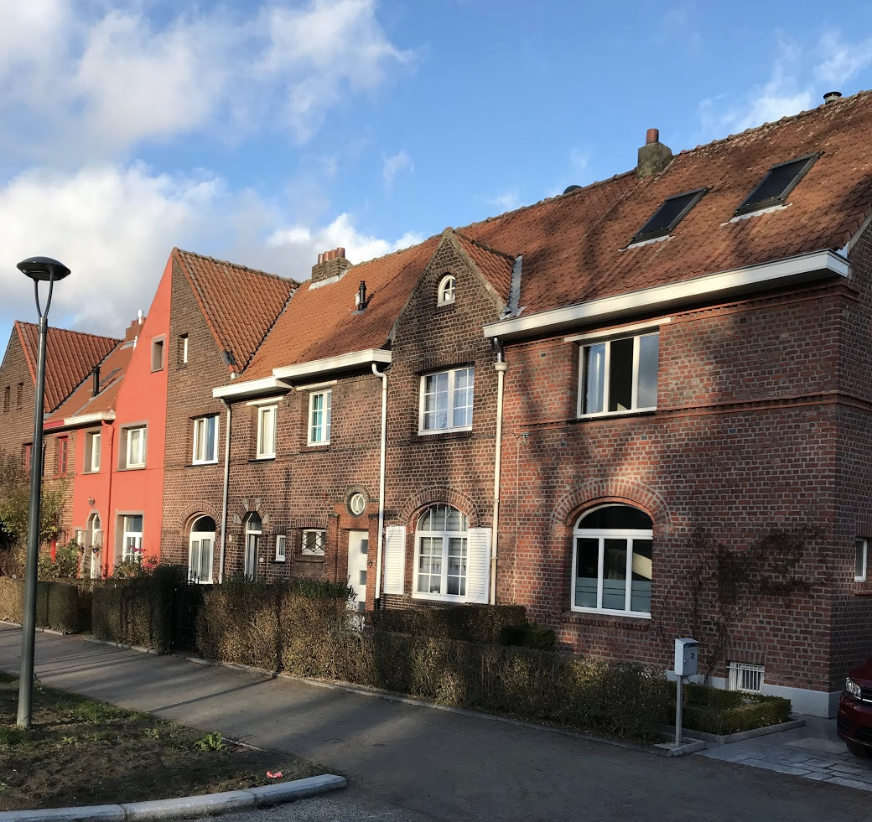
Het Heideken garden city

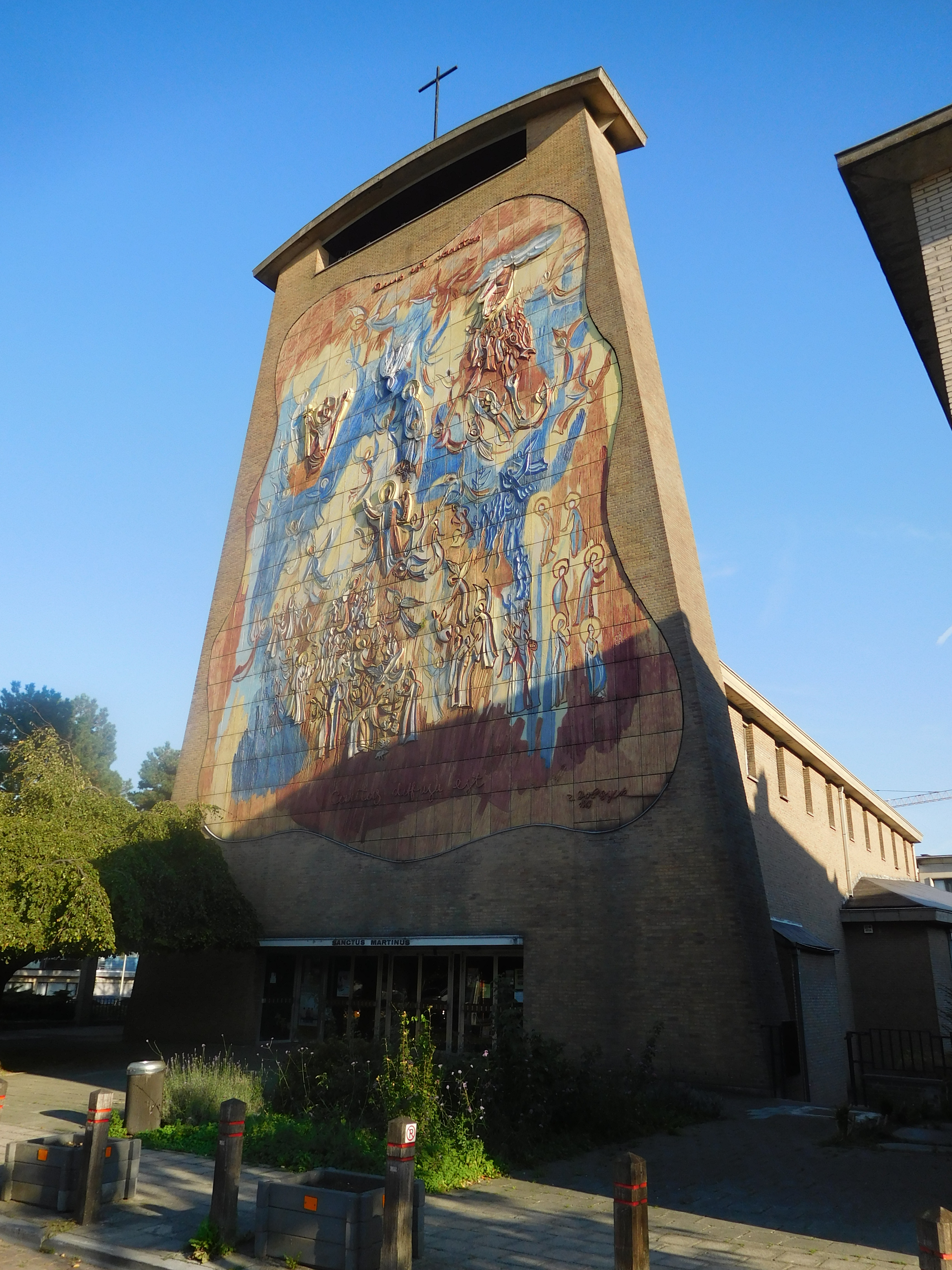
Church of St. Martin

Ganshoren Marsh

== Politics ==
The current city council was elected in the October 2018 elections. On that occasion, Pierre Kompany was elected mayor of Ganshoren. He was the first black mayor in Belgium, and is the father of footballer Vincent Kompany. The current mayor is Jean-Paul Van Laethem.
