= Bastudalen Nature Reserve =

Nature reserve in Sweden

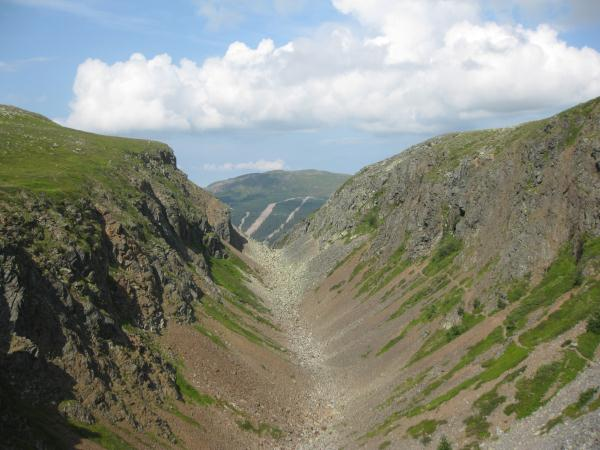
- Dromskåran valley

- Location within Jämtland Location within Sweden
- Location: Sweden
- Nearest city: Östersund
- Coordinates: 63°04′N 13°47′E
- Area: 28 km^{2} (6,900 acres)
- Established: 2002

Bastudalen Nature Reserve (Swedish: Bastudalens naturreservat) is a nature reserve in Jämtland County in Sweden.

The nature reserve consists of the mountain peak Drommen and the Dromskåran valley. Dromskåran is a 50 m (160 ft) deep, 150 m (490 ft) broad and circa 1 km (0.62 miles) long canyon, formed by melting water during the end of the last Ice age. The area also contains other geological remnants from the Quaternary period. The nature reserve is part of the EU-wide Natura 2000-network.
