= Rivieren Castle (Ganshoren) =

Castle in Brussels, Belgium

- Château de Rivieren (French); Kasteel ter Rivieren (Dutch)
- Ganshoren, Brussels, Belgium
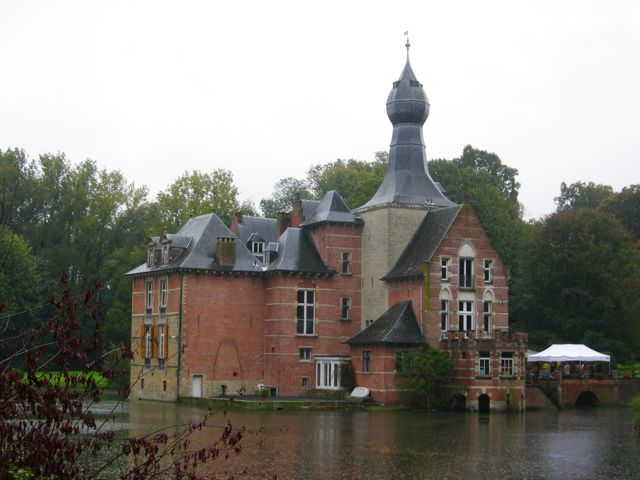
- Rivieren Castle

Site information
- Type: Castle
- Condition: Intact

Location
- Location within Brussels Rivieren Castle (Belgium)
- Coordinates: 50°52′36″N 4°18′40″E

Site history
- Built: 12th century

Rivieren Castle (French: Château de Rivieren; Dutch: Kasteel ter Rivieren) is a 12th-century castle in Ganshoren, a municipality of Brussels, Belgium. The castle is surrounded by a pond (a vestige of the large medieval moat), in a park of 10 hectares (25 acres): Albert Park.

== History ==
Originally a defence tower, the present-day castle was built in different phases from the 12th to the 19th centuries. Originally a possession of the Clutinck (Clutinc/Clutinckx) family, it later changed ownership several times until it finally was sold in 1973. Nowadays, it is the only surviving medieval-style castle in the Brussels-Capital Region and is used for conferences, receptions, expositions and similar kinds of events.

== See also ==
- List of castles and châteaux in Belgium
- History of Brussels
- Culture of Belgium
- Belgium in the long nineteenth century
