= Lage Zwaluwe-'s-Hertogenbosch railway =

Railway line in the Netherlands

Lage Zwaluwe-'s-Hertogenbosch railway (Langstraatspoorlijn)

Overview
- Status: Defunct, partially open
- Locale: North Brabant, Netherlands
- Termini: Lage Zwaluwe railway station; 's-Hertogenbosch railway station

History
- Opened: 1890
- Closed: 1970s (passengers); 1964 (goods)

Technical
- Line length: 46.3 km (28.8 mi)
- Number of tracks: 1
- Track gauge: standard-gauge railway
- Operating speed: 40 km/h (25 mph)
Route map
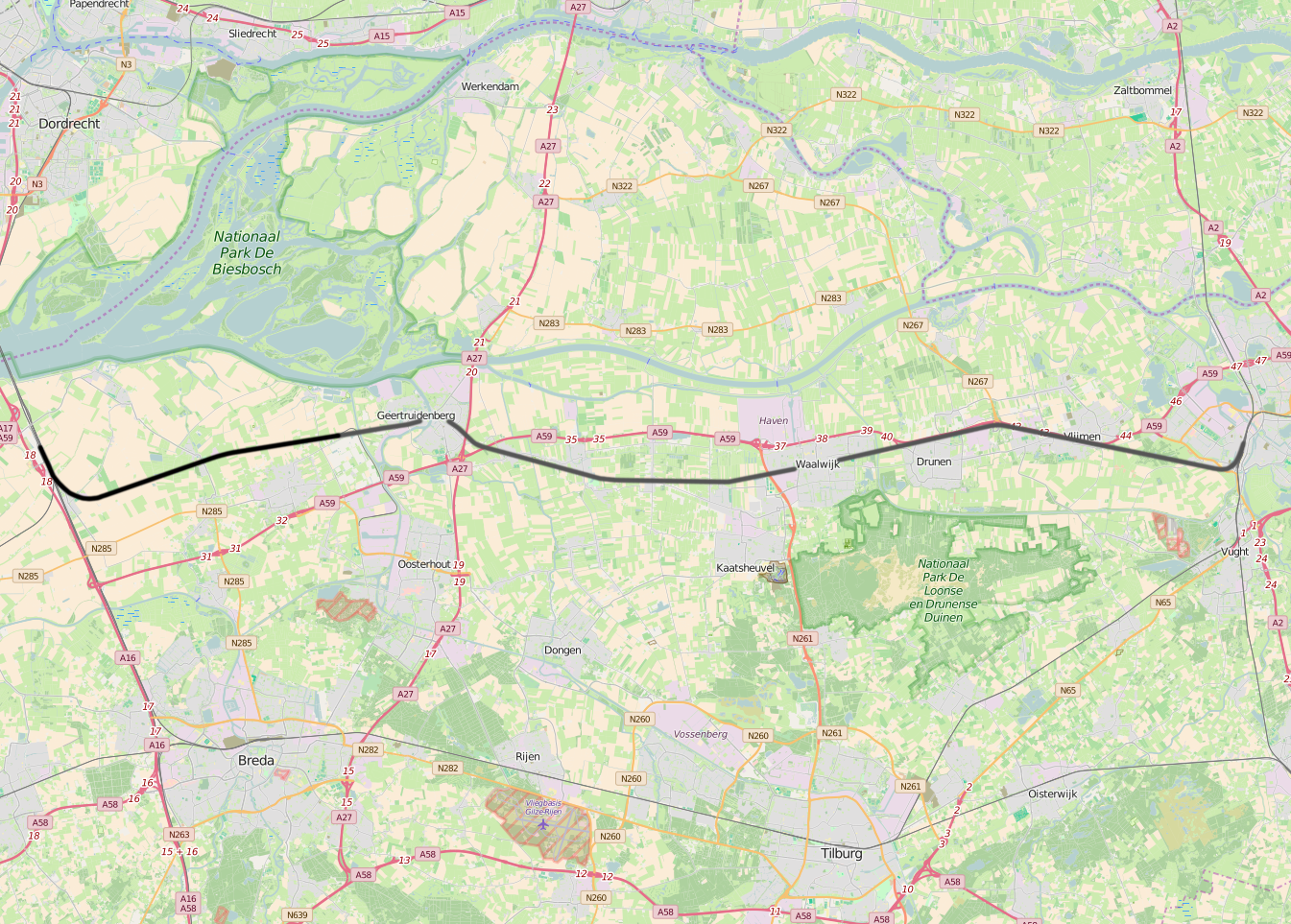

The Lage Zwaluwe-'s-Hertogenbosch railway or Langstraatspoorlijn is a defunct and partially open railway line in North Brabant, Netherlands. It ran through Langstraat from Lage Zwaluwe railway station via Waalwijk to 's-Hertogenbosch railway station. Part of the line had been repurposed for recreation. It has the nickname Halvezolenlijntje. The Moerputten Bridge is a unique example of engineering.

== History ==
In 1870 the Utrecht–Boxtel railway was the first to cross the big rivers of the Netherlands, which had till then divided the Dutch railway system in two unconnected parts. More to the west, the connection from the economic center of the Netherlands, near Amsterdam and Rotterdam, towards the south still relied on crossing the Hollands Diep by boat near Moerdijk and Lage Zwaluwe. On 1 January 1872 the very long Moerdijk Railway bridge was opened. It completed the Breda–Rotterdam railway and so completed the connection of North Brabant to the north.

The Langstraat is an area situated roughly between Geertruidenberg and 's-Hertogenbosch, its center is in Waalwijk. The Langstraat was the center of the Dutch leather and shoe industry. This industry relied mostly on imported raw materials, but the finished shoes were mostly for the domestic market. The idea of the Lage Zwaluwe-'s-Hertogenbosch railway was to connect this industry to the railway system.

=== The Verster plan ===
In October 1869 A.H. Verster, a judge from Boxtel requested a concession to construct a railroad from 's-Hertogenbosch to Vlijmen, Nieuwkuijk, Drunen, Waalwijk, Besoijen, Waspik, Oosterhout, Wagenberg en Zwaluwe to Zevenbergen. From early 1870 the final designs for the line were made. The idea was for the line to become part of a connection from Brouwershaven (at the time a transloading harbor for Rotterdam) to Boxtel, where the Boxtel-Wesel railway was under construction. Work ceased until early February 1872. Verster then asked for support from local authorities, but his plans came to nothing. The specific geographical features of the area significantly may have contributed to this delay.

Just west of 's-Hertogenbosch the original Verster route was about the same as that which would later be executed. The railroad was first planned to exit the city to the west. The Ministry of Defense ordered Verster to keep 2 km clear of the Waalwijk Meuse dyke, so the line was then planned through the Boschveld, a low area seasonally flooded by the Bokhovensche Overlaat (Bokhoven overflow), an overflow in the dyke near Bokhoven. From there, the line would reach Vlijmen, Nieuwkuijk, Drunen, and the Baardwijksche Overlaat (Baardwijk overflow). The Baardwijk overflow called for a 'bridge' 1 km long. The stretch through the Boschveld had planned a 6 m high very solid dyke with many openings. The cost was thought too much, so the route was changed to circumvent Baardwijk to the south. Again, the military intervened to keep the railroad away from the fortifications of 's-Hertogenbosch, so the connection to that city would have to be made at Vught. The project was never realised.

=== The government plan ===
When the government announced that it planned further construction of railways by the state, 33 municipalities in the Langstraat and the Land van Heusden en Altena appealled to the government for a railroad through the area. They stated that every farmer and manufacturer in the area were at a severe disadvantage because the absence of rail transport heightened transport cost. The appeal asked for two railroads. One from Zwaluwe direct to 's-Hertogenbosch. The other from Dordrecht to Vlijmen via Werkendam. The appeal reasoned that these routes would enable a more reliable means of transport as the Baardwijksche Overlaat and the Boschveld usually flooded each year and ice would block the river. In summer 1874 the provincial executive of North Brabant sent a request for the same two lines to the government.

In February 1875 legislation for the construction of many railways by the state was proposed. It contained the construction of the Lage Zwaluwe-'s-Hertogenbosch line. The Langstraat Railway would become part of a line from Breda to 's-Hertogenbosch via over Oosterhout and Waalwijk. In October the line led to prolonged debate in the House of Representatives. The debate centred on whose interest was served: 's-Hertogenbosch to Lage Zwaluwe served the nation better than Breda via Oosterhout that was favored locally. An amendment by Van Wassenaar van Catwijck that directed the line over Geertruidenberg to Zwaluwe satisfied both interests and people celebrating in Geertruidenberg.

In summer 1876 engineers busied themselves with establishing the route. The eastern part of the route was planned to run between Waalwijk and Sprang to Giersbergen, Cromvoirt and then Vught, different from what was anticipated by the locals. 's-Hertogenbosch municipality now began to protest the proposed direction. By February 1877 the engineers were busy projecting a route along the line Drunen, Nieuwkuijk, Vlijmen.

In February 1878 the government announced an extension of the railway north of Oude Maasje (Bergsche Maas had yet to exist) from Zwaluwe to Heusden and Vlijmen, bypassing the Baardwijk Overflow and the center of the Langstraat. Protests followed immediately. By March 1879, the proposed route had changed again, from Geertruidenberg to Waalwijk to Heusden, and to connect to 's-Hertogenbosch north of the city's railway station. In February 1880 the route of the railway was fixed at what was eventually to be constructed. The only difference was that in Nieuwkuijk it would be directed south, towards Isabella Fortress, thus connecting to 's-Hertogenbosch south of its railway station. In July 1880 the House of Representatives then treated the expropriation law for the railway line.

The delay would enable in July 1881 that the Tramway Tilburg-Waalwijk to connect the Langstraat to the railroad network before the railroad. The latter ran from Tilburg via Loon op Zand Sprang, and Besoijen to the harbor of Waalwijk.

=== Construction ===
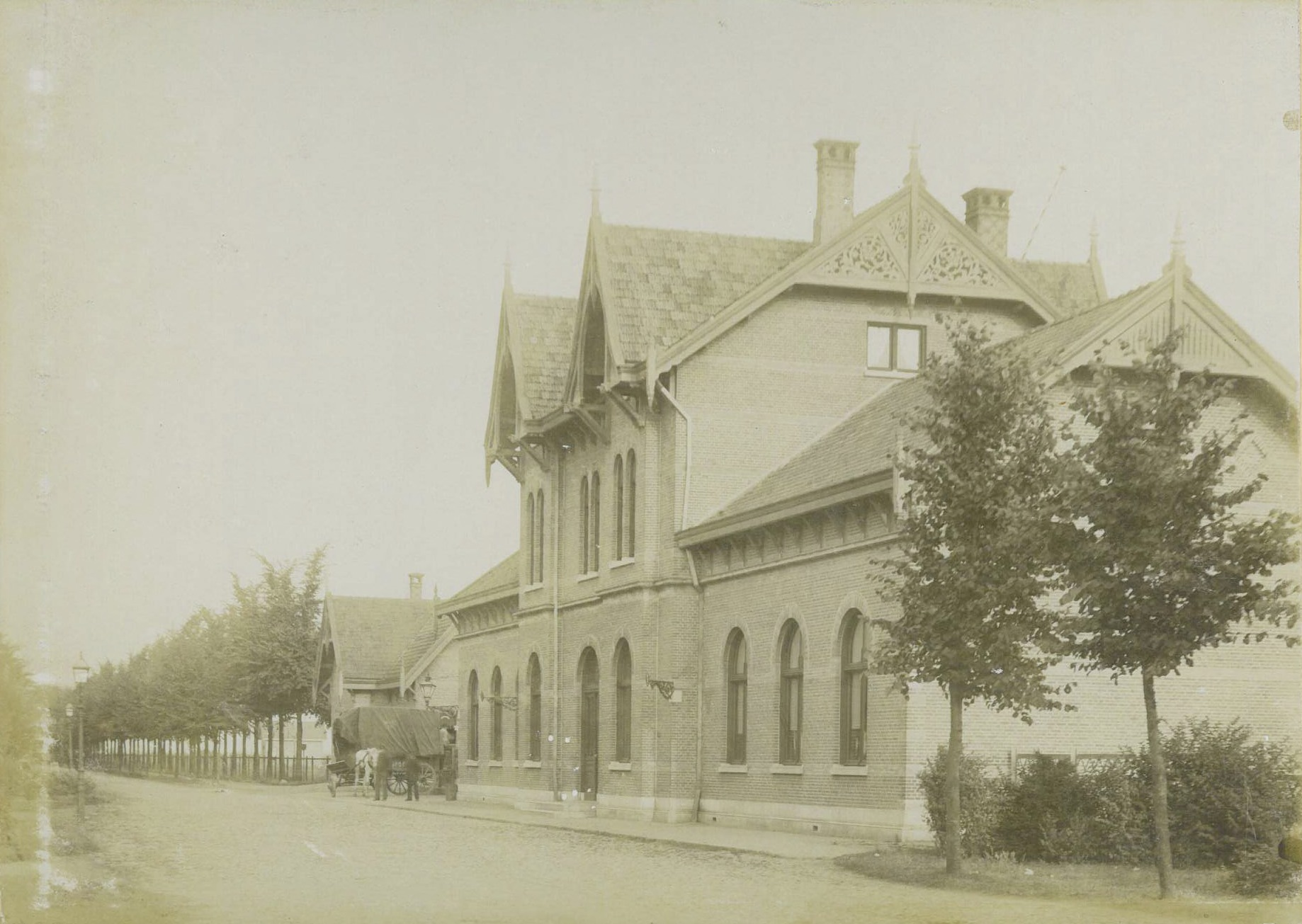
Front of Waalwijk station in 1898.

The section from Zwaluwe to Waalwijk would be completed first. On 7 June 1882 the construction of the part of the line from Zwaluwe to Baardwijk was tendered. In September 1882 construction of the Donge Railway Bridge started. By April 1883 railroad construction was approaching Waalwijk. However, the Donge Railroad Bridge had a delivery date of 1886, and so trains could not use it yet. In December 1885 the stretch Zwaluwe-Geertruidenberg had not yet been planned to be used by the Maatschappij tot Exploitatie van Staatsspoorwegen. By late January 1886 the line was said to be complete to Baardwijk. In October 1886 the section from Lage Zwaluwe to Waalwijk was opened.

The section from Waalwijk to Vlijmen would be completed in 1888. This contained the most costly part, the Baardwijk Railroad Bridge over the Baardwijksche Overlaat (Baardwijk overflow). The lower section (piers) of the Baardwijk Railroad Bridge was built in the second half of 1882. In September 1884 the construction of the superstructure started. It was wide enough for a double track, but for the moment it would be single track with a footpath. However, in December 1884 pedestrians could not yet use it during the flooding of the Baardwijksche Overlaat (Baardwijk overflow). In May 1885 the Baardwijk Railroad Bridge and Moerputten Bridge were tested. In December 1885 the government decided that the Baardwijk Railroad Bridge could be used by pedestrians when the Baardwijksche Overlaat (Baardwijk overflow) was flooded. In April 1886 construction of the section from Baardwijk to Vlijmen was tendered, and in June 1886 works on that stretch started. On 1 June 1888 the section from Waalwijk to Vlijmen was opened.

The section from Vlijmen to 's-Hertogenbosch would be the last and most costly section of the railway. A first version of the plan for this section had been proposed by the government in October 1883, but had been rejected due to the high cost of 3,000,000 guilders. In February 1887 a new proposal that cost 2,766,000 was made. By then the construction had become entangled in relocation of the wood railway station of 's-Hertogenbosch. 'S-Hertogenbosch wanted to do this, because the grounds west of the city center were the only ones that could be made suitable for building at reasonable cost. This engineering problem was explained in February 1887 on account of the expropriation law for the railway from Cromvoirt! to 's-Hertogenbosch. Things then could have become much worse when a committee from the House of Representatives said that the stretch could be made much cheaply once the Bergse Maas was finished, because the railway would then no longer have to be on high dykes. However, in May 1887 expropriation law for the last section was approved. The only change in the law was that the railroad would be constructed at 7 m above Amsterdam Ordnance Datum, instead of constructing the new station and the line at 9 m above AOD. In October 1888 the expropriation was halted again, probably because of another change in the plans.

On 29 December 1888 the construction of the railway proper from Vlijmen was finally tendered. The expected price was 482,000 guilders. The tender was won by A.D. van Seters and N. van Haaren from 's-Hertogenbosch for 481,000 guilders. On 14 October 1890 the stretch from Vlijmen to 's-Hertogenbosch was officially opened. At the time it was connected to the old railway station of 's-Hertogenbosch.

== Operations ==
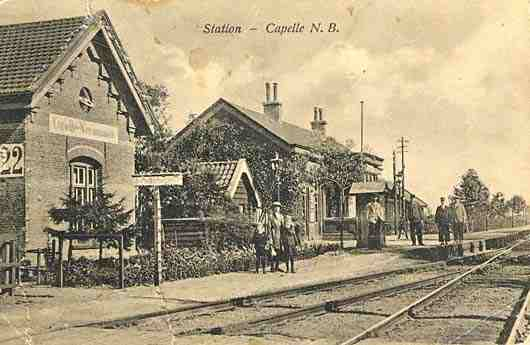
Capelle-Vrijhoeve Station in about 1930.

By October 1888 there were 5 trains a day between Zwaluwe and Vlijmen. Up till then it was used as a Lokaalspoorweg (local rail). When the railroad neared completion the question of how it would be used came up again. As a local railway the train would stop at all stations and halts. As a regular railway it would stop only at official stations, and use heavier trains. The Chamber of Commerce of Waalwijk wanted both for the railroad. It also desired that Waalwijk would be officially upgraded to a first class station, where fast trains would stop. The first regular schedule was that of a regular railway. It had five trains with standard material, one of these a fast train.

An important group of passengers were the representatives of the Langstraat shoe manufacturers. They would use the train to travel to individual shops while carrying sample shoes. In 1907 the Waalwijk Chamber of Commerce asked for a train from 's-Hertogenbosch later in the evening, so these representatives could still get home after visiting customers in Limburg and Germany.

The nickname 'Halvezolenlijntje' is a concatenation of Halvezool (half shoe sole) and line. Halve zool is a replacement shoe sole for the front half of a shoe, but it is also slang. The slang meaning seems to denote someone who is retarded. The name might also have had to do with the single track, and the 22 stops that were made on the line.

=== The end ===
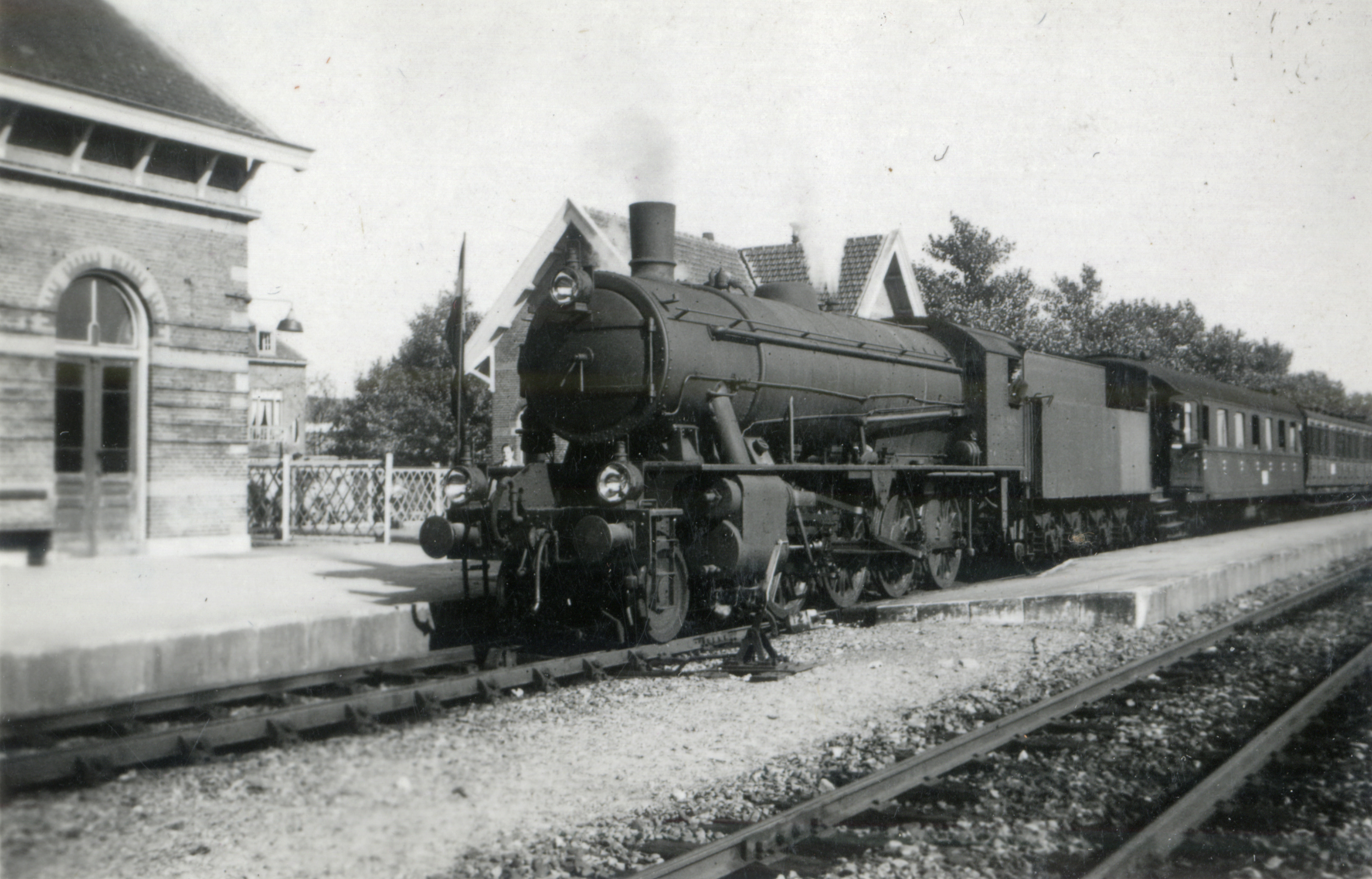
Waalwijk Station in 1947.

In World War II the line was heavily damaged, especially its bridges. Even before the end of the war there were rumors that the national railway wanted to close down the Langstraatspporlijn. When confronted with these rumors, it stated that it was only thinking about using parts of its bridges for emergency repairs on other lines. Whatever the truth, the full stretch of the line was only reopened on 4 October 1947. The new schedule saw two trains in both directions, consisting of a steam locomotive and two carriages. Even though it was more expensive, the bus was often more popular, because it stopped inside the villages, and most people travelled only very short distances.

At the restart there were doubts about the long term viability of the small line with its 13 stations. These caused a stop every 5–6 minutes. An alternative would be to replace it by busses for local traffic, and to elecitrify the line for the longer distances. The fact that the railway used old steam equipment on the line, instead of diesel trains was probably also significant in the decline. When the National Railways announced in March 1950 that it might stop passenger transport, there were local protests. By November 1950 passenger transport had indeed been discontinued on the line. The North Brabant province then offered to buy the railroad, so it could cheaply construct a way for road traffic.

The next discussion was about cargo transport. Given its interest in building a cheap road, the province enthusiastically supported the plan to eliminate the freight trains. However, the Ministry of Defense, intervened, and decreed that the railroad could not be broken up for strategic reasons. Meanwhile the busses could hardly handle the increased traffic, and so they increased their fares. Cargo transport was then limited to one train every two days. On the eastern sections, passing crossings was very tedious. At each crossing the operator of the train had to get out, close down the beams, and open them again after the train had passed. Cargo transport ceased in 1972.

After cargo transport ceased the line was broken up. One of the last pieces to disappear was a stretch just south of 's-Hertogenbosch, near the Koning Willem I College. This stretch was broken up in 1997, during the construction of the road bypass west of the city.

== Characteristics ==
=== East of Waalwijk ===
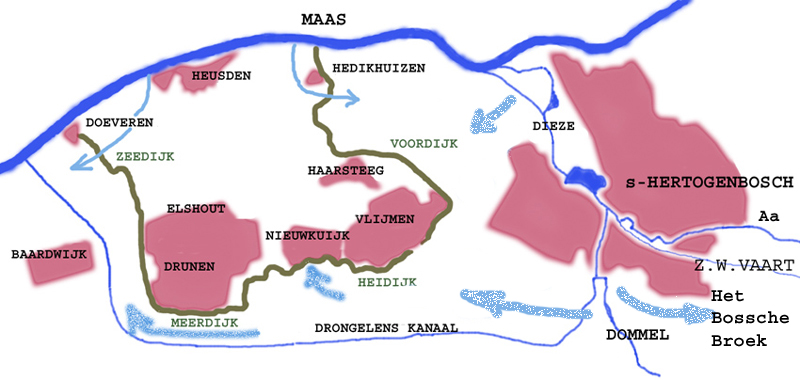
Area east of Waalwijk

East of Waalwijk / Baardwijk, the railway was constructed through a flood plain called Baardwijksche Overlaat. The big blue arrows on the map are in this area. The black line is a dyke around Heusden, Vlijmen and Drunen. Almost every winter, the flood plain would overflow with water from the Meuse and Rhine.

The Lage Zwaluwe-'s-Hertogenbosch railway was constructed on a high dyke. This would prevent the track from getting flushed away each winter. However, it would not be possible to make the dyke strong enough to withstand most flooding. Therefore huge openings would have to be made in the railroad dyke, so the floods could easily pass it. These openings took the form of really long bridges, which spanned over the land that would be flooded.

The Baardwijk Railroad Bridge (Spoorbrug over de Baardwijksche Overlaat) was the longest with a length of 885 m. Most of it has since been destroyed. The Moerputten Bridge was 585 m long. It still exists as pedestrian bridge in a nature reserve, and has recently been restored.

It seems that during construction the possibility of later expansion to a double track was taken into account. At least this is what the width of the piers of the Moerputten Bridge and Baardwijk Railroad Bridge indicates.

=== Images just before break up ===
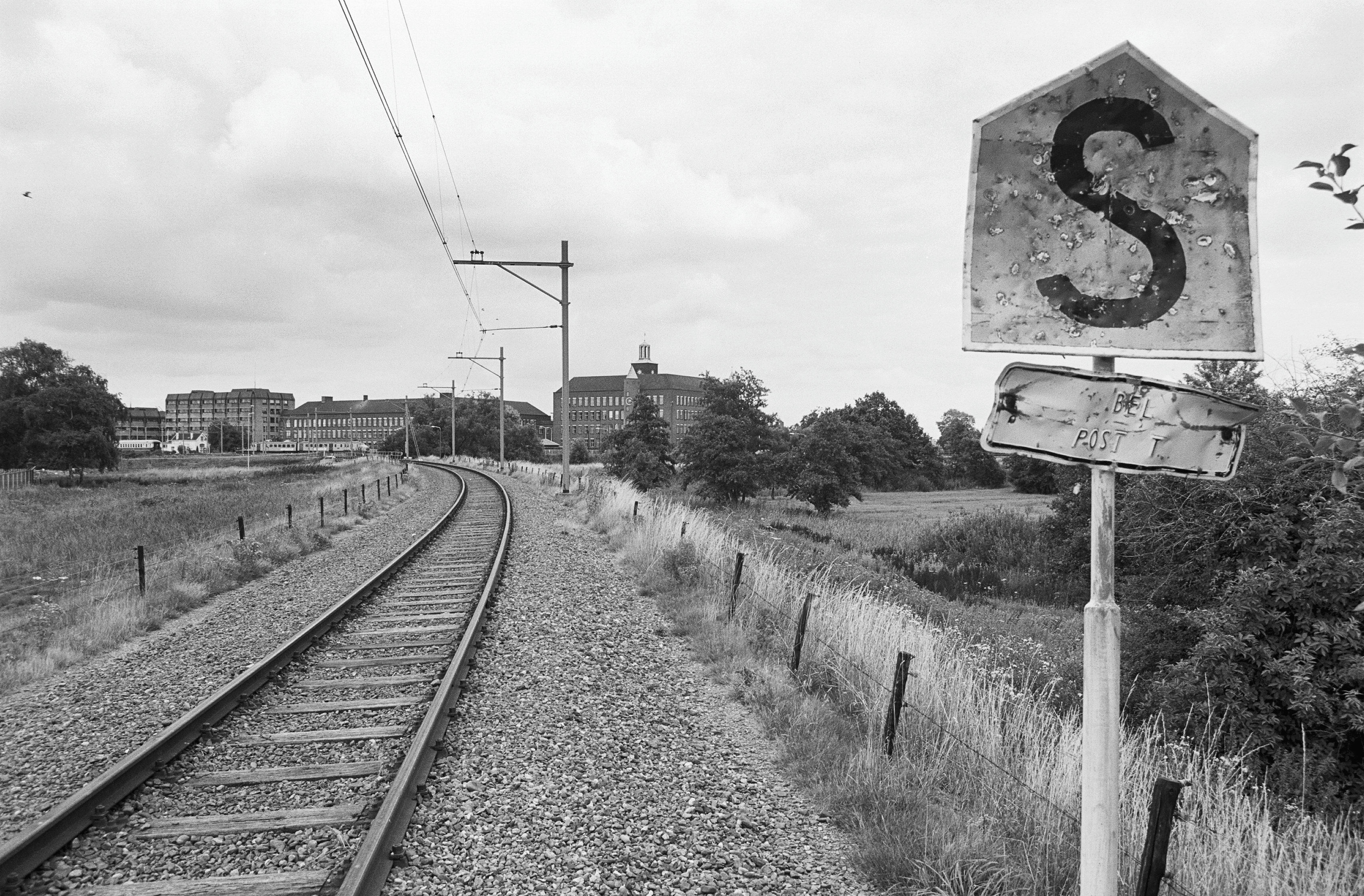
The line in 's-Hertogenbosch in 1989.

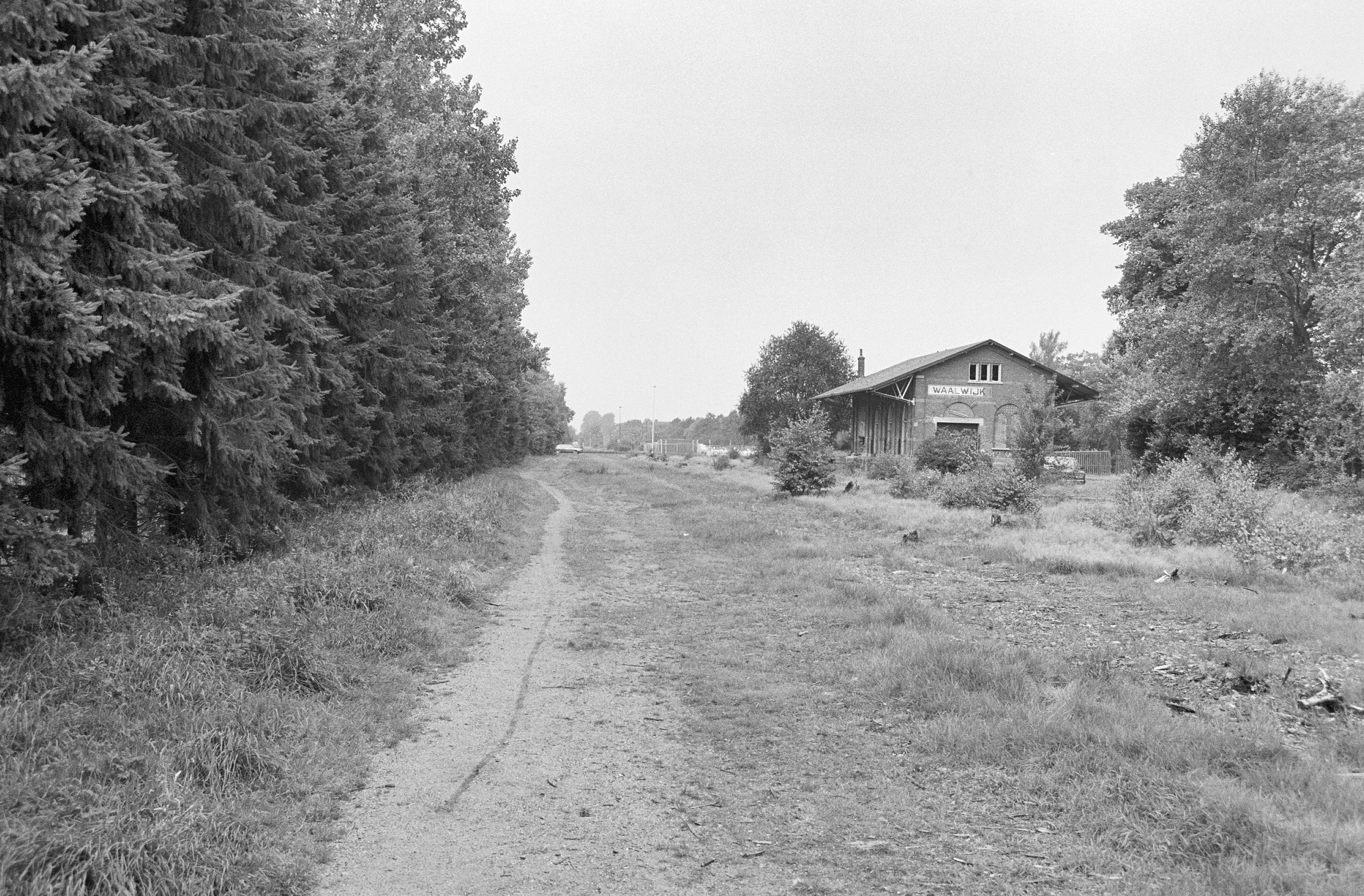
Former warehouse near Waalwijk station in 1988.

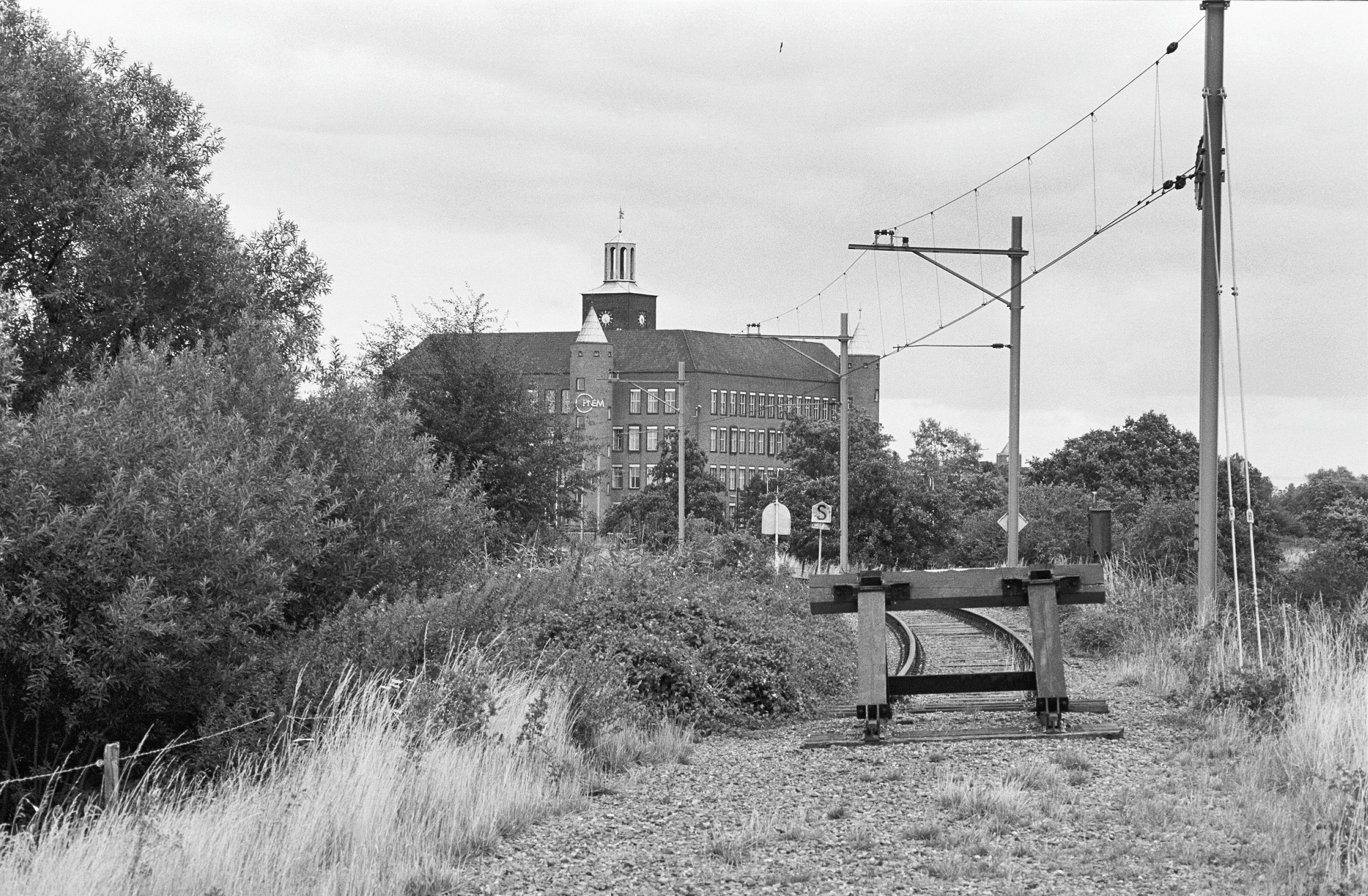
Railway in Den Bosch before breakup in 1988.

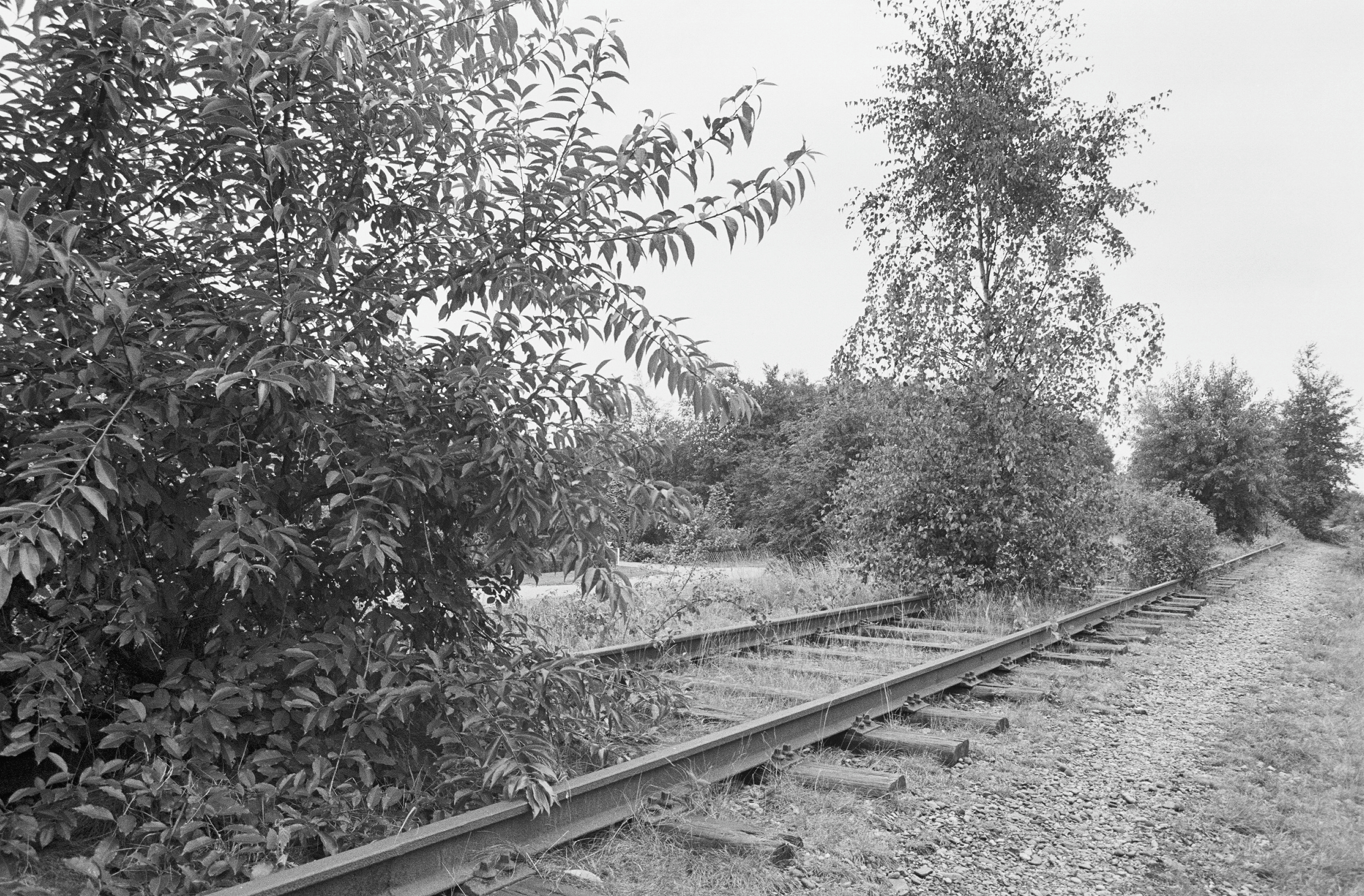
Railway before breakup at Bloemendaalseweg in Waalwijk in 1988.

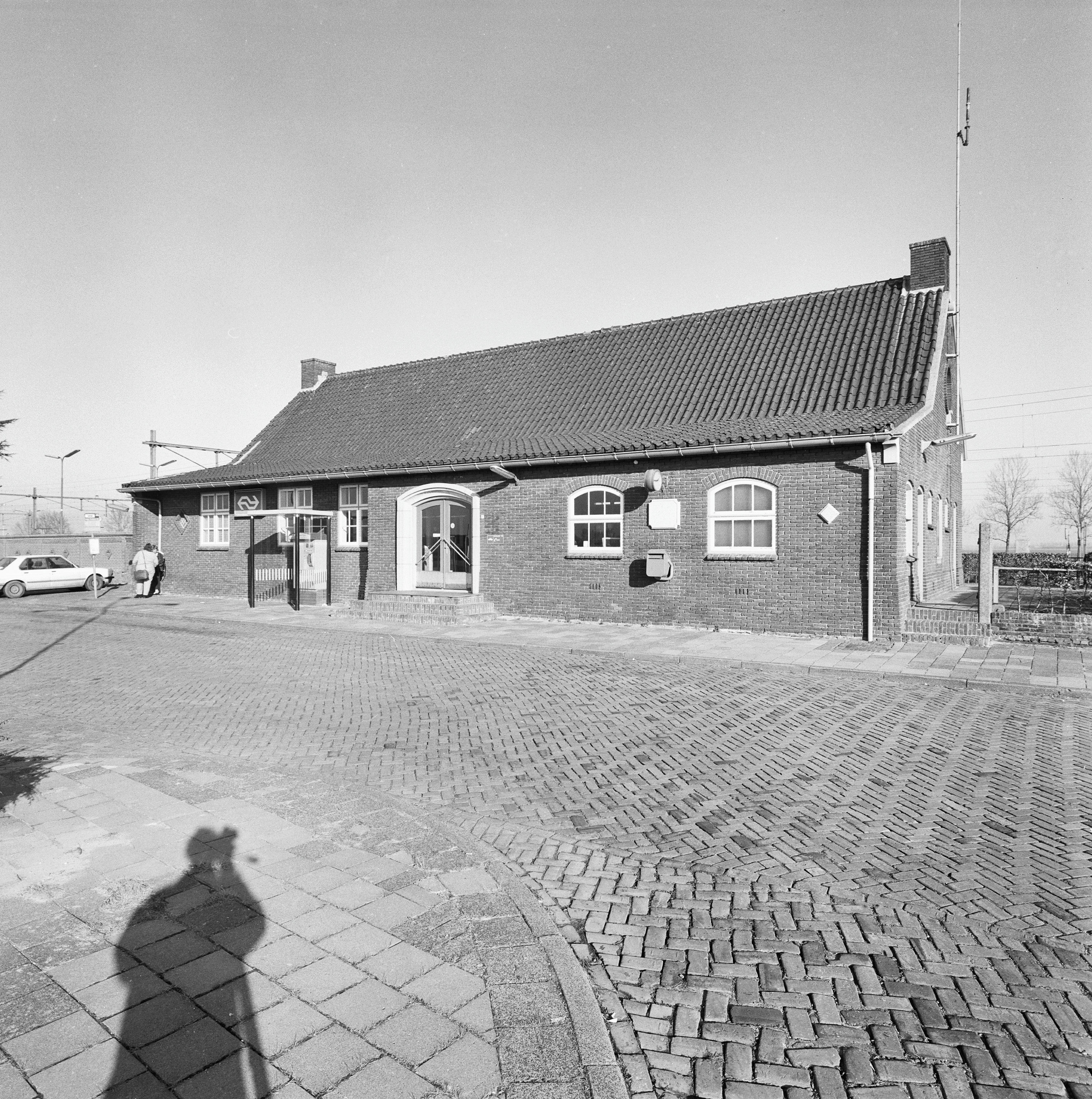
Lage Zwaluwe railway station in 1998

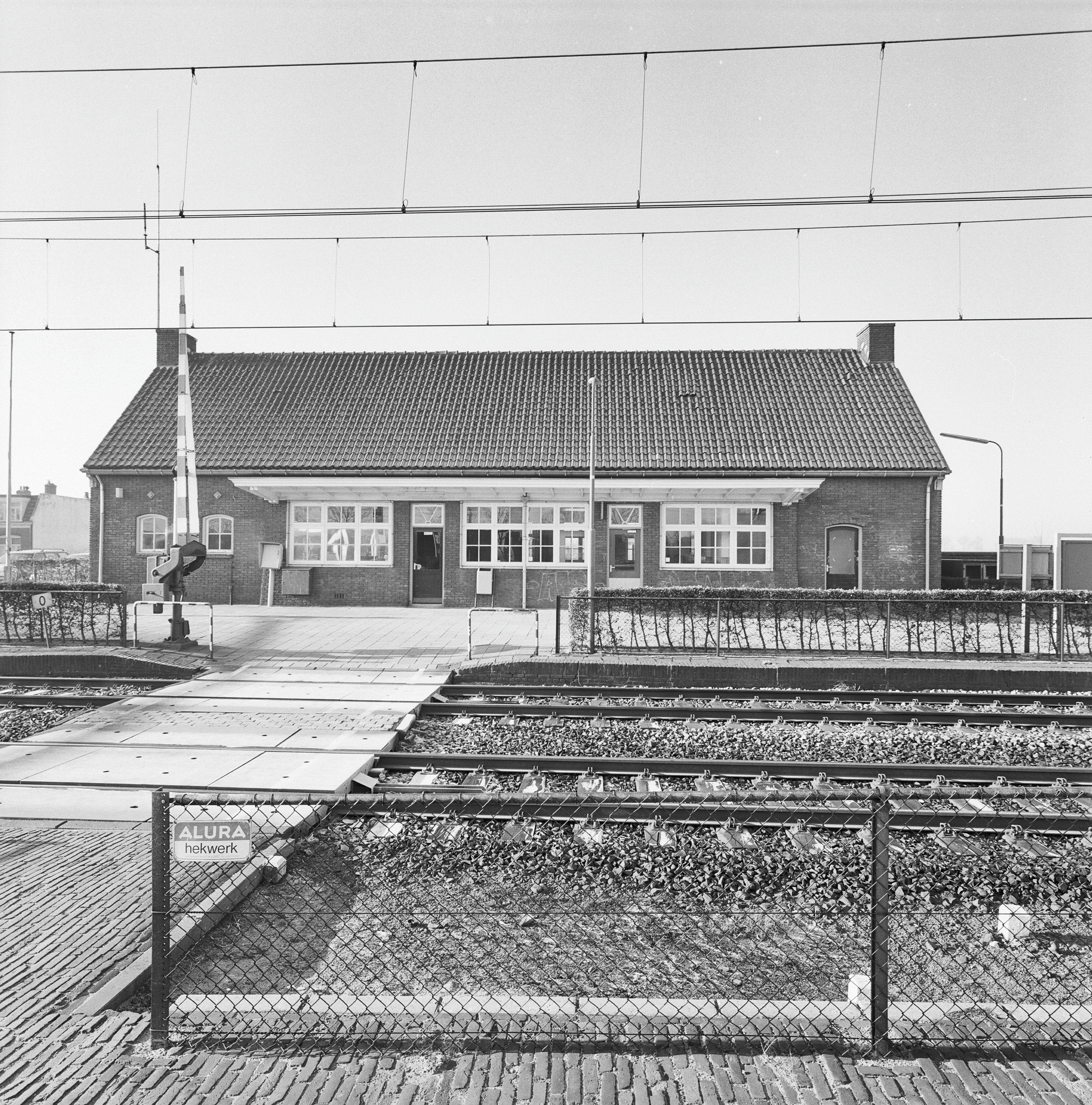
Station Lage Zwaluwe rails side in 1998.

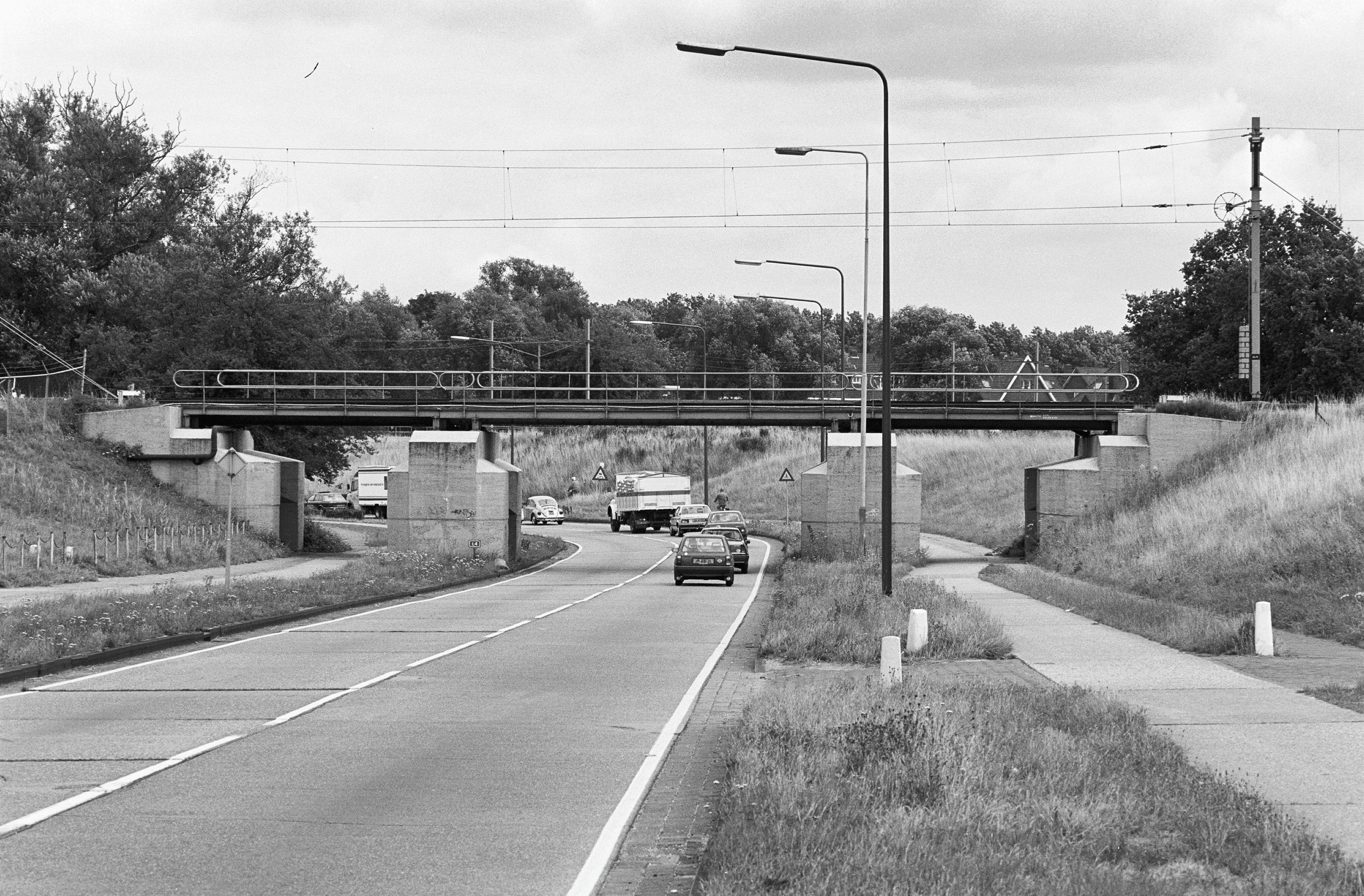
Railway bridge in 's-Hertogenbosch crossing Vlijmenseweg.

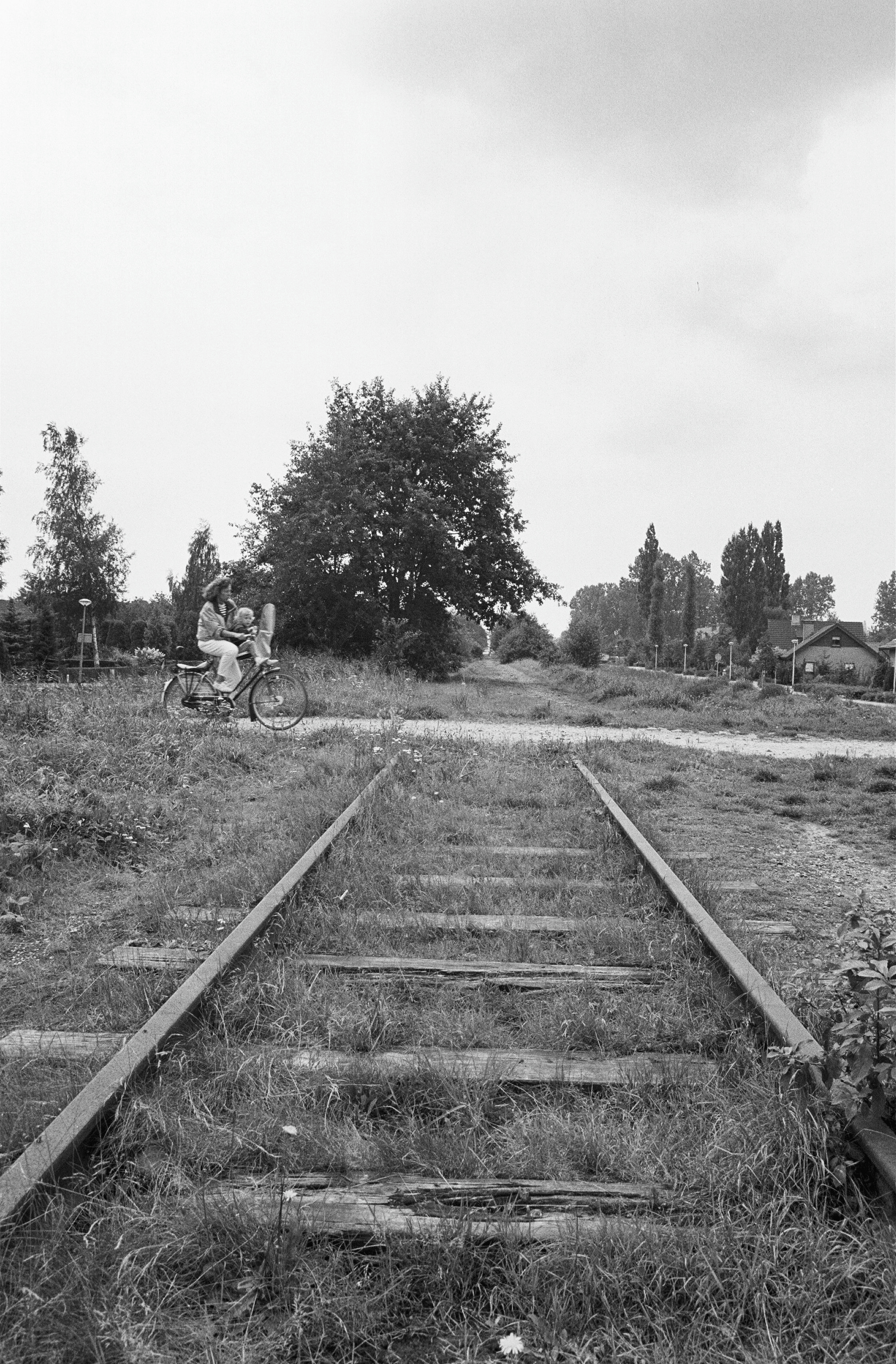
The railway in Waalwijk. The track has since been broken up.

== Current Situation ==
=== Cargo railway Lage Zwaluwe - Oosterhout ===
Only the stretch from Lage Zwaluwe to a point just west of Geertruidenberg remains. It is connected to a side-track that then continues south to an industrial area at Oosterhout. This part is still in use for cargo transport.

=== West of 's-Hertogenbosch ===
From 's-Hertogenbosch towards the west, a large part of the former railroad has been repurposed for bicycle use and recreation. This is especially true west of Deuteren, where the former railroad dyke is pedestrians only. Here it runs through the nature reserve Moerputten, and sports the historic Moerputten Bridge and the Venkant Bridge.

In Vlijmen and Drunen the former track has little value, as it runs along the highway A59 and many parts have paved over for car traffic. Just west of Drunen the former track is again a bicycle lane.

=== The Baardwijksche Overlaat ===
Between Drunen and Baardwijk the former railroad runs through the small nature reserve Baardwijksche Overlaat. Here bicycle lane is on the former Baardwijk Railroad Bridge (Spoorbrug over de Baardwijksche Overlaat). Only three small parts of this very large work remain. The largest of which crosses the Drongelens Canal.

=== West of Waalwijk ===
Between Waalwijk and Raamsdonk the track is now a bicycle path of about 10 km.

=== Remains ===
In comparison with other Dutch tracks there are a lot of railway related buildings near the railroad.

- Zevenbergschenhoek railway station is on Bloemendaalse Zeedijk 4 next to a big distribution center
- Hooge Zwaluwe railway station at Stationsweg 2 is visible from a nearby crossing.
- Made en Drimmelen railway station has been demolished.
- The piers of the bridge over the Donge are still visible, the bridge will be restored.
- Guard House 15A near Omschoorweg 10 in Raamsdonksveer.
- Raamsdonk railway station next to Stationstraat in the center of the village.
- Guard House 19A on Stadhoudersdijk 21 west of Waspik.
- Guard House 20 on Spoorstraat 2 south of the village.
- Vrouwkensvaart railway station in a field on Vrouwkensvaartsestraat 5a.
- Guard House 22 between two villages on Wendelnesseweg Oost 2.
- North of Sprang-Capelle at the height of Julianalaan are remains of a small bridge.
- The railroad dyke is visible near the crossing with the N261.
- Besoijensche Steeg Railway Station on Sprangseweg 1. Here the railway crossed the Tramway Tilburg - Waalwijk.
- Remains of Baardwijk Railroad Bridge, originally this bridge ended at to Drunenschedijk Railway station.
- Drunenschedijk Railway Station on the dyke at Eindstraat 56.
- Venkantbrug restored 2010-2011.
- Moerputten Bridge, highlight of the line, restored from 2004 to 2011.
- Guard House 39 in Deuteren.
- The railroad dyke between Guard House 39 and 's-Hertogenbosch railway station is prominent and still almost intact.

=== Images of the current situation ===
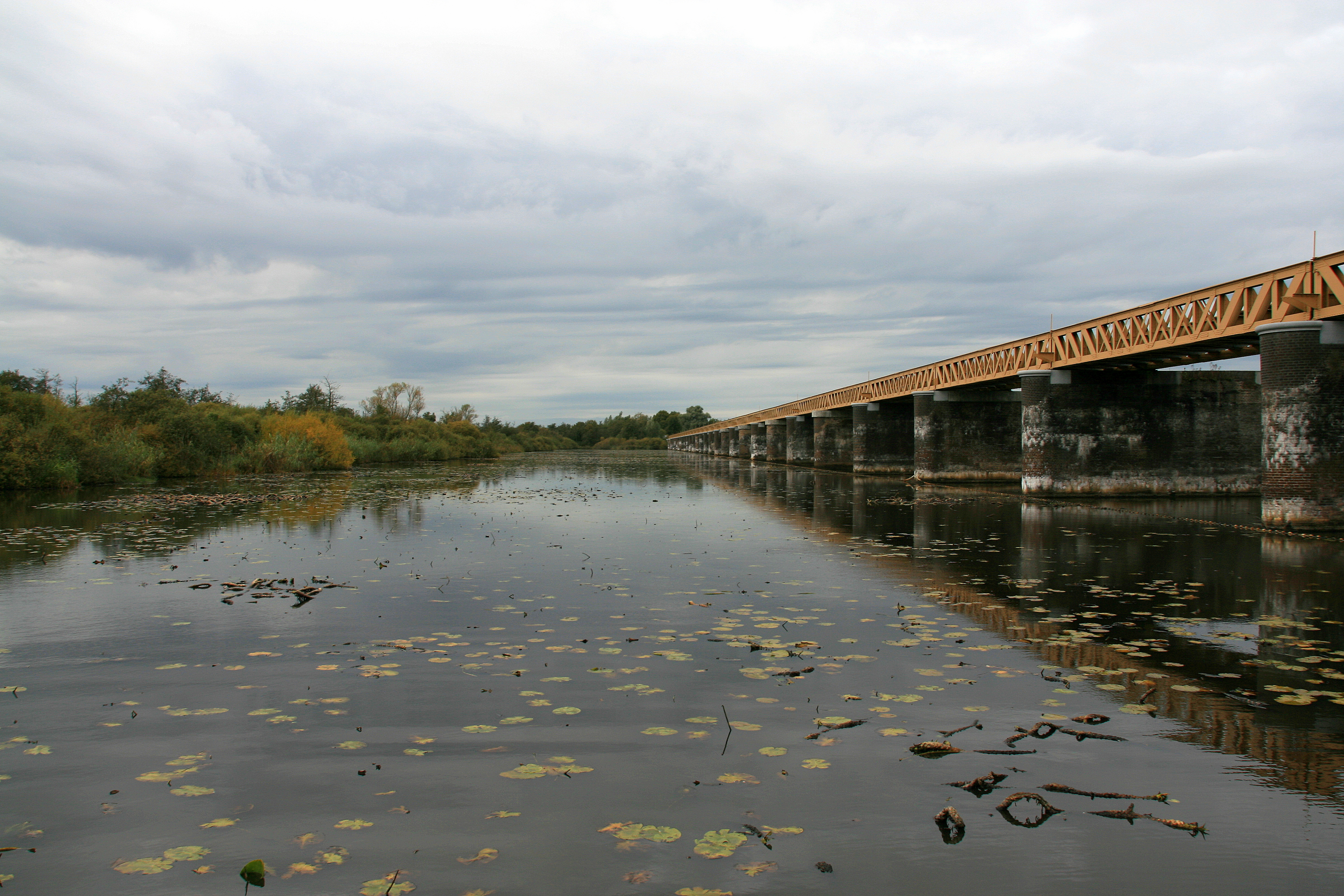
Moerputten Bridge in 2012.

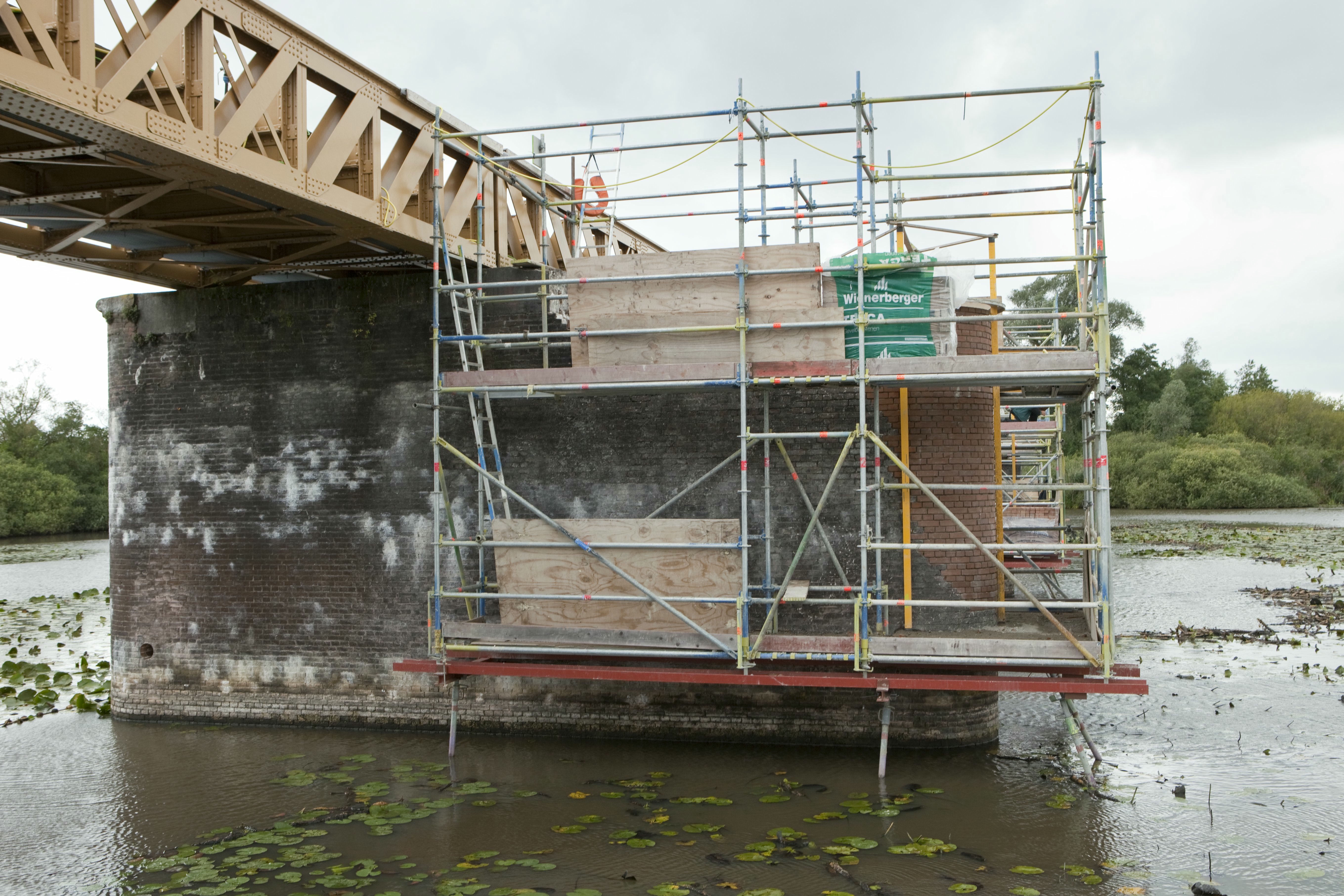
Renovation of the Moerputten Bridge in 2009.

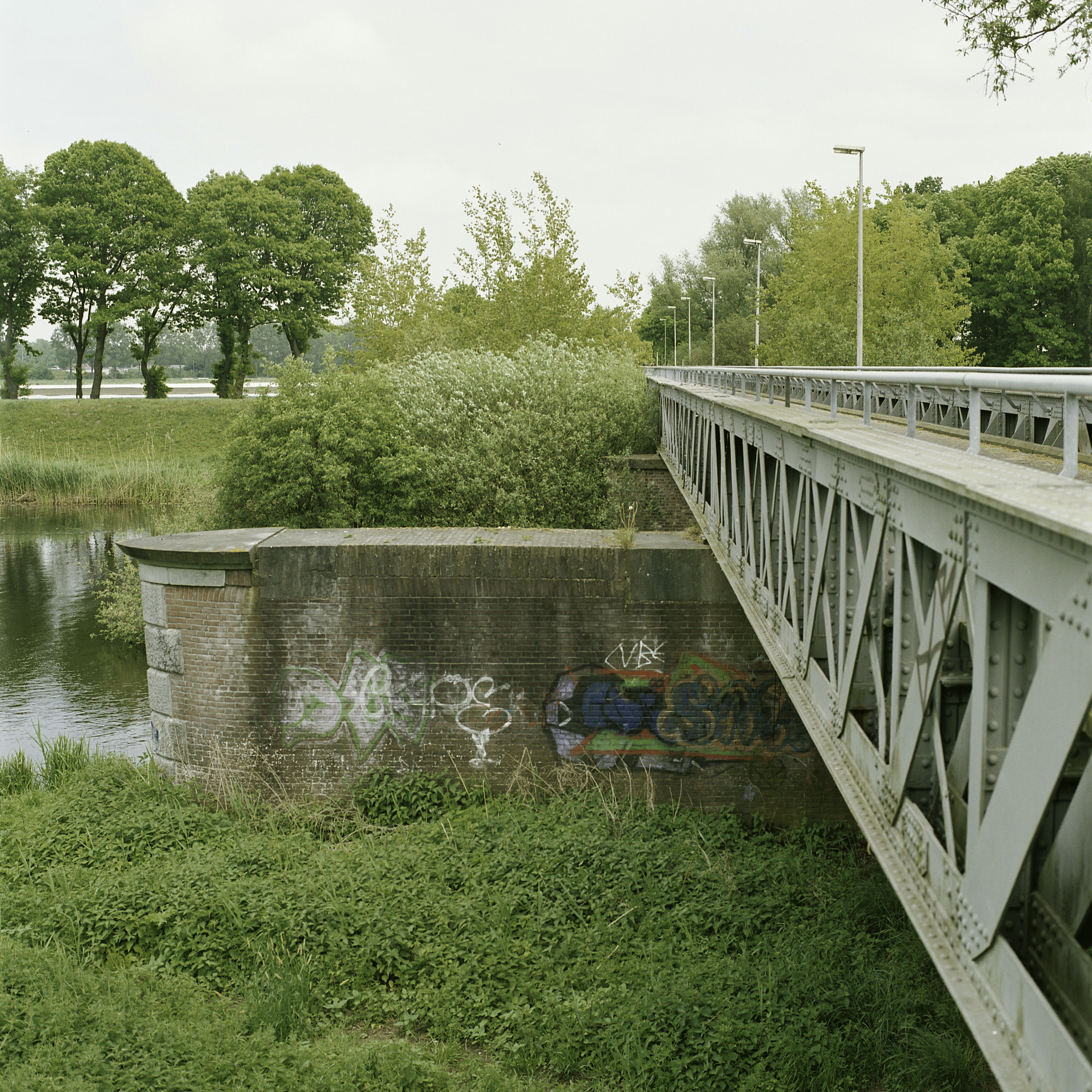
Baardwijk Railroad Bridge in 2006, now a bicycle lane.

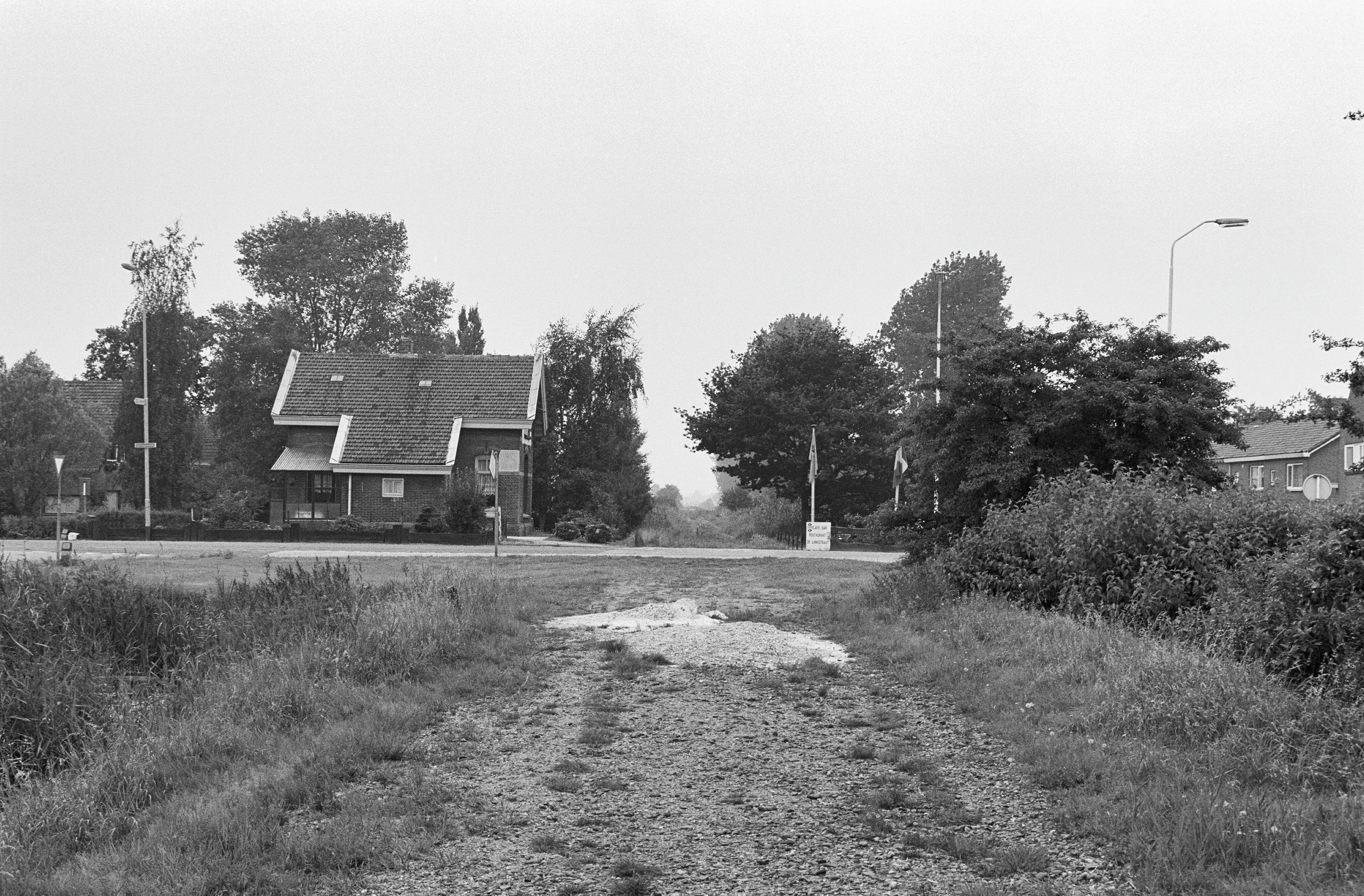
Stop Besoijensche Steeg/Guard House 25 in 1988. By 2020 there was a bicycle lane on the railroad dyke.

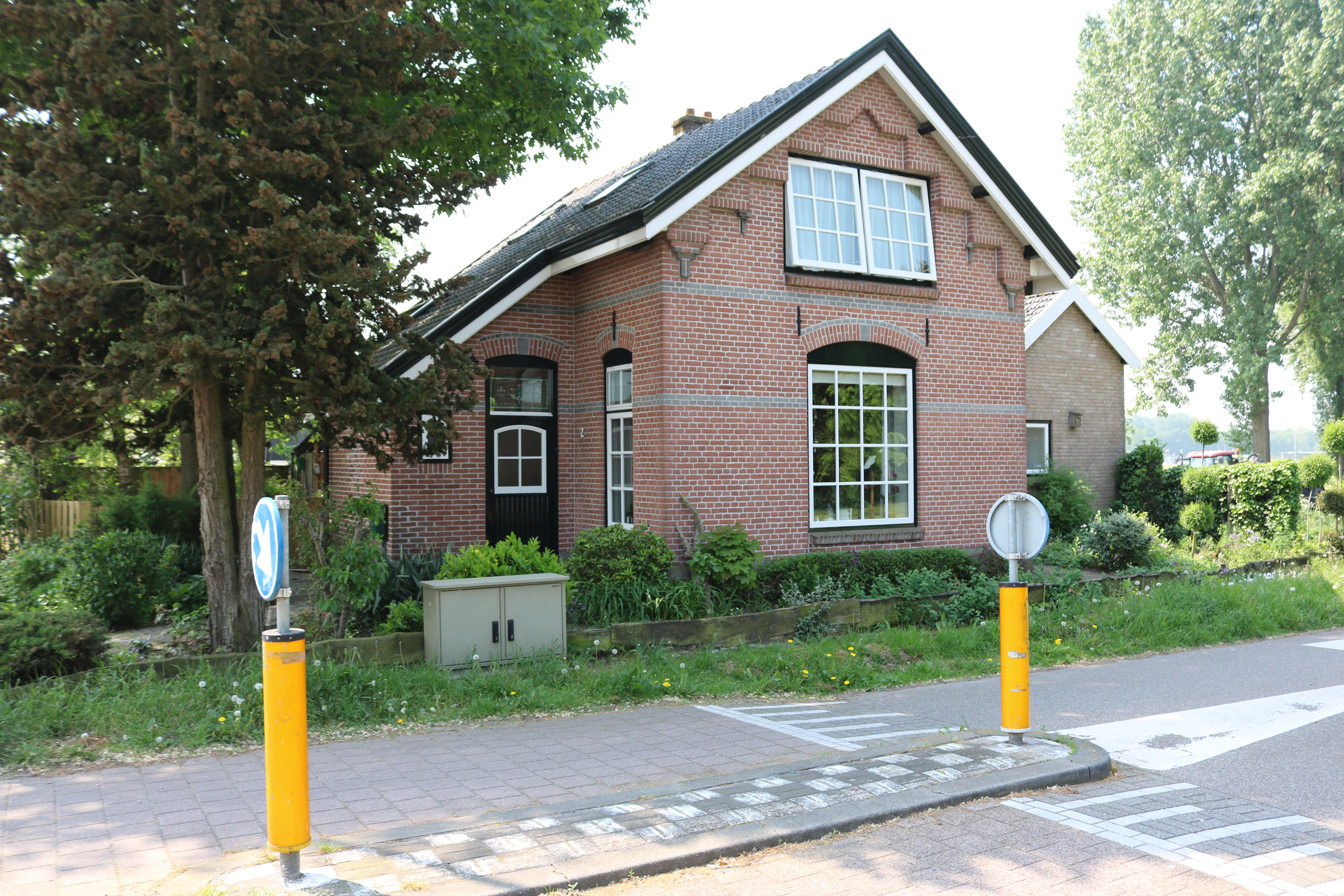
Station Waspik-'s Gravenmoer Railway Station in 2018.

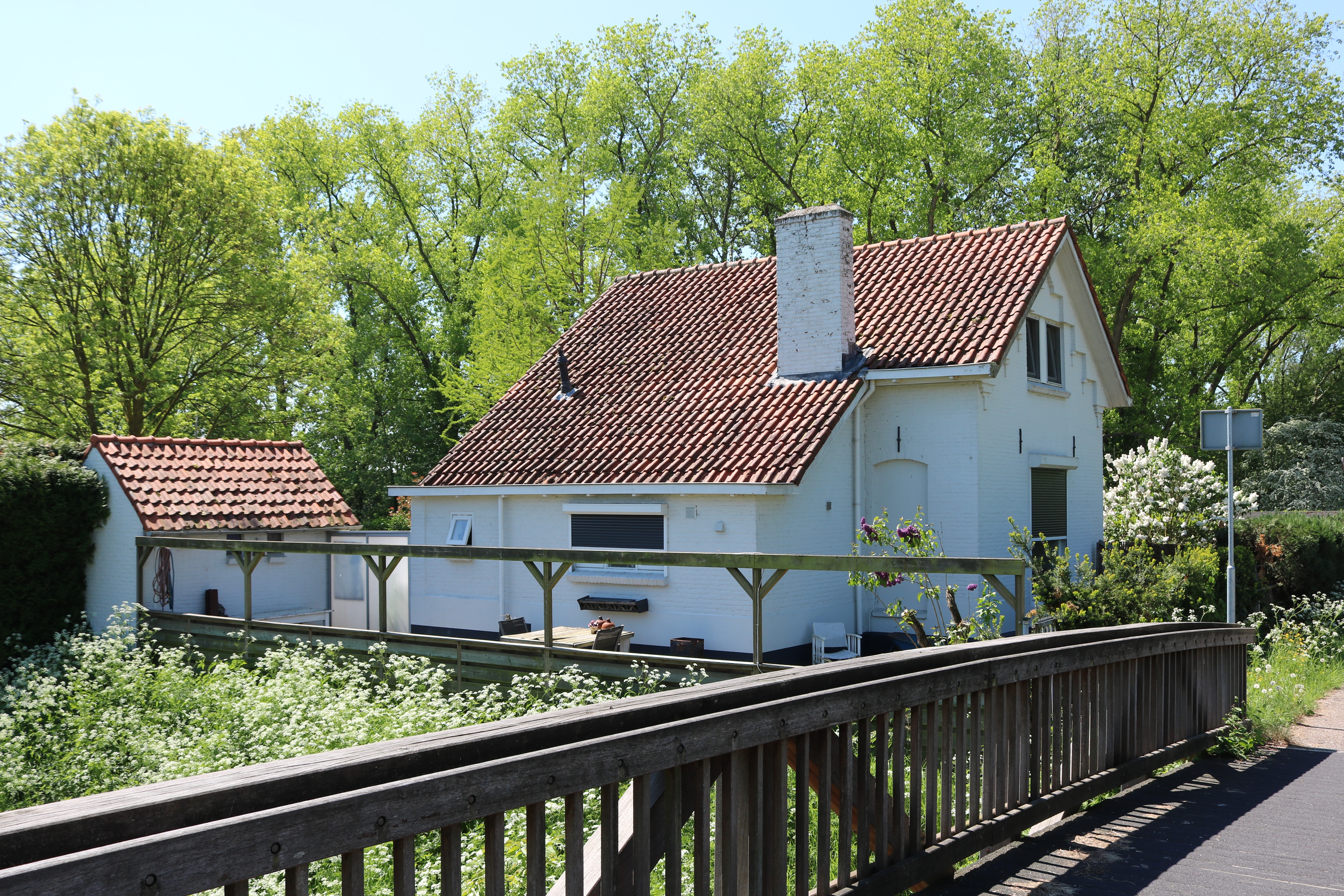
Drunenschedijk Railway Station in 2018.

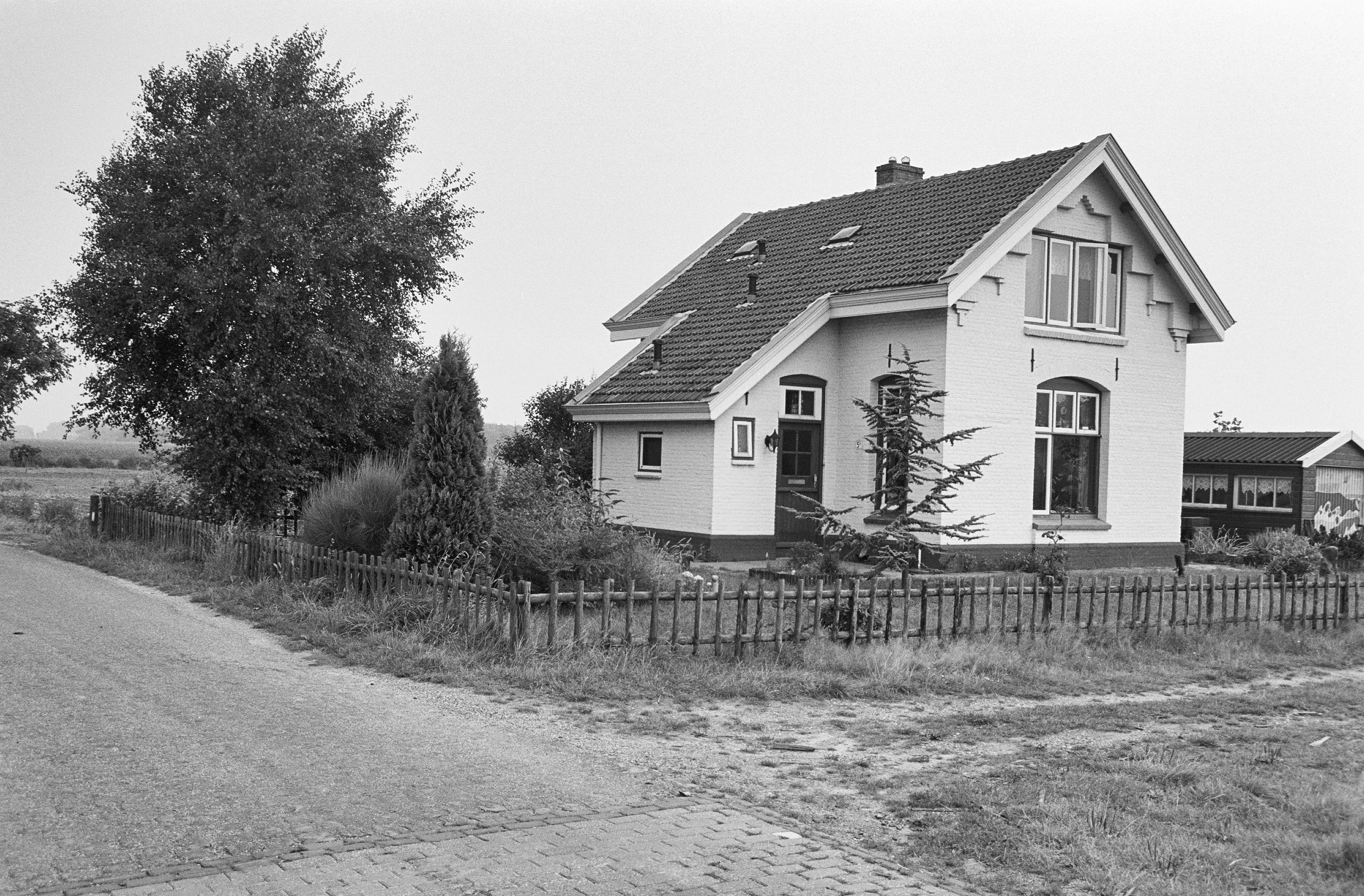
Vrouwkensvaart Railway Station also Guard House 21, in 1988.

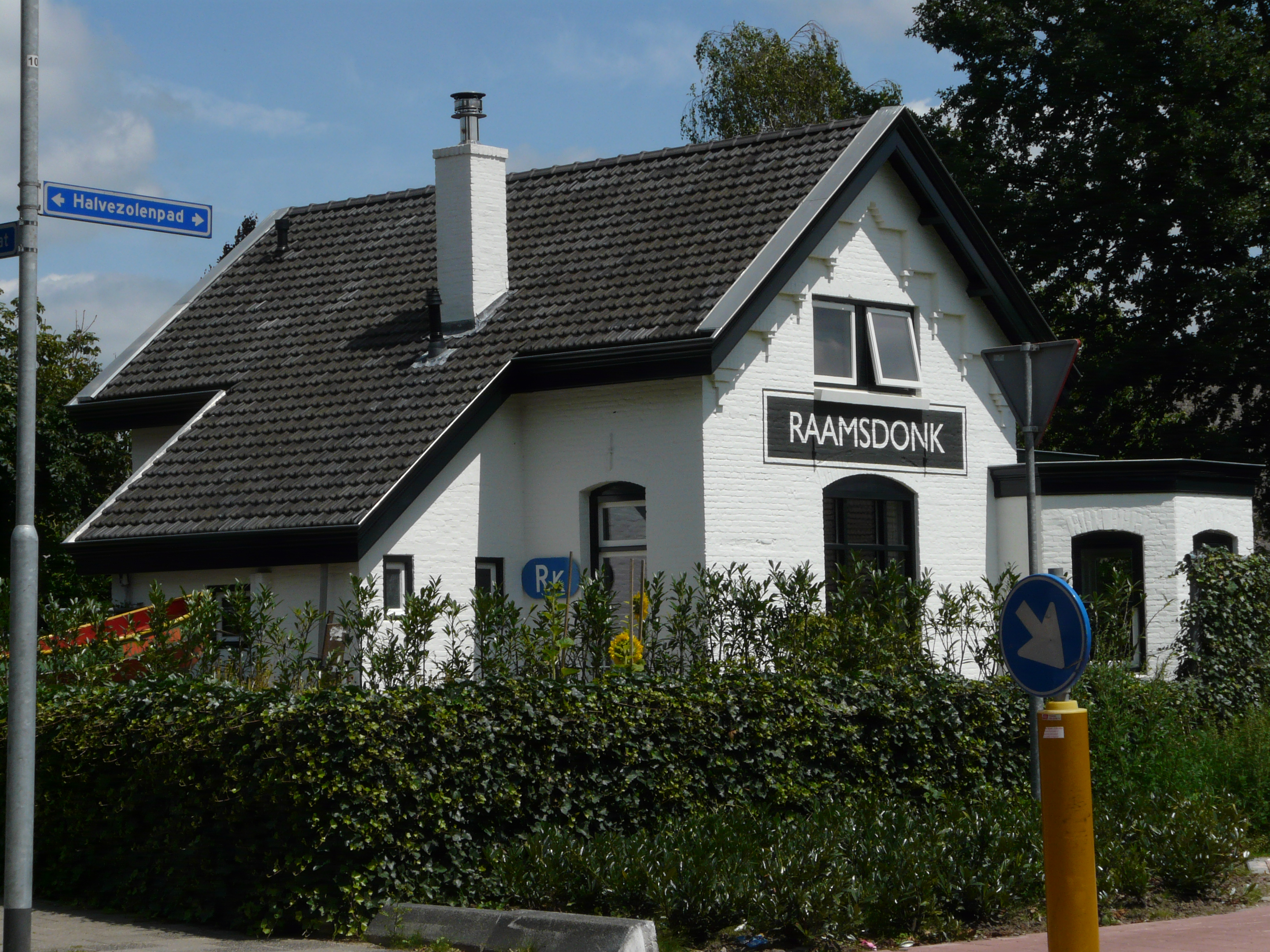
Raamsdonk Railway Station in 2011.

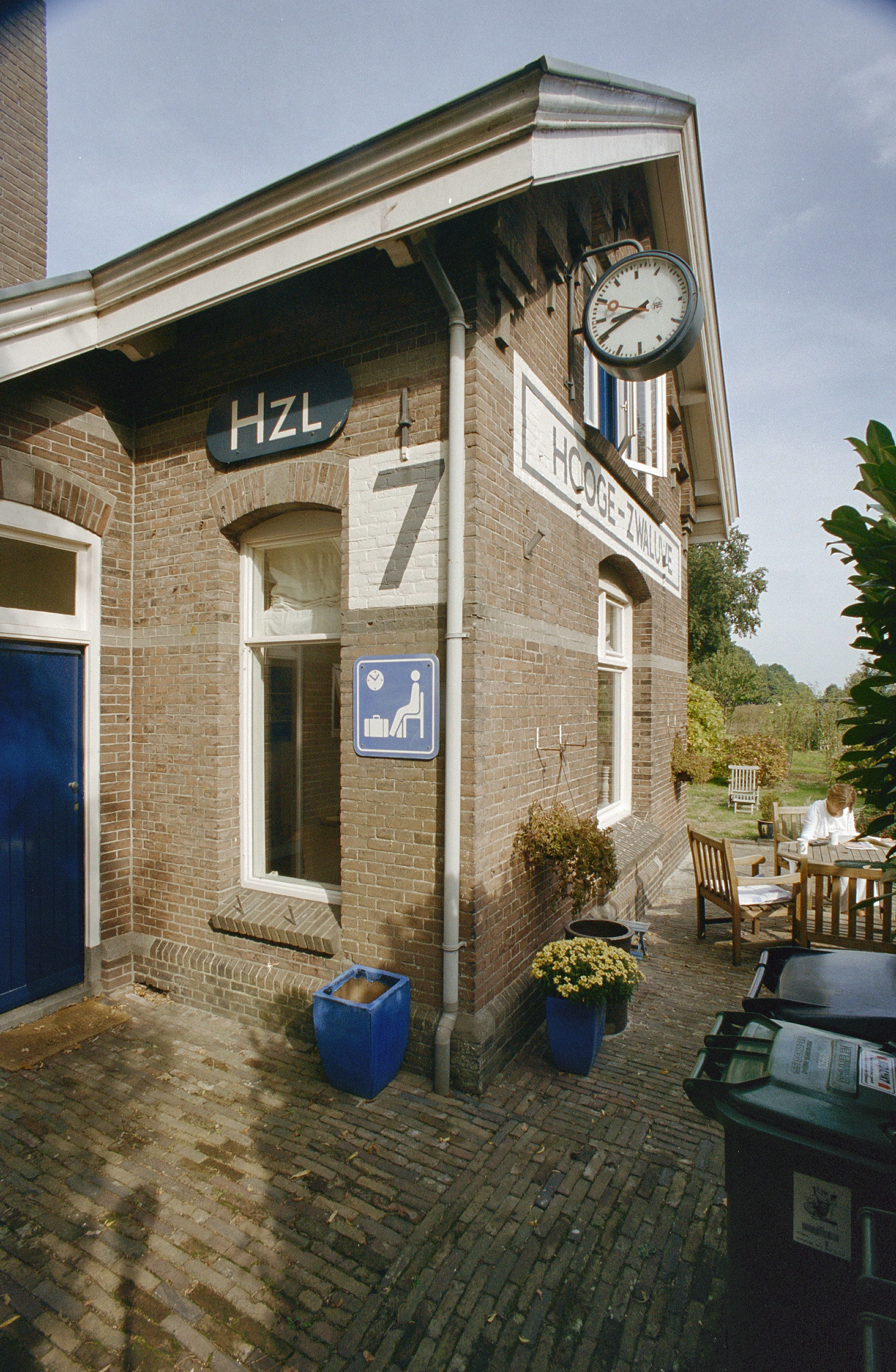
Hooge Zwaluwe Railway Station in 2003

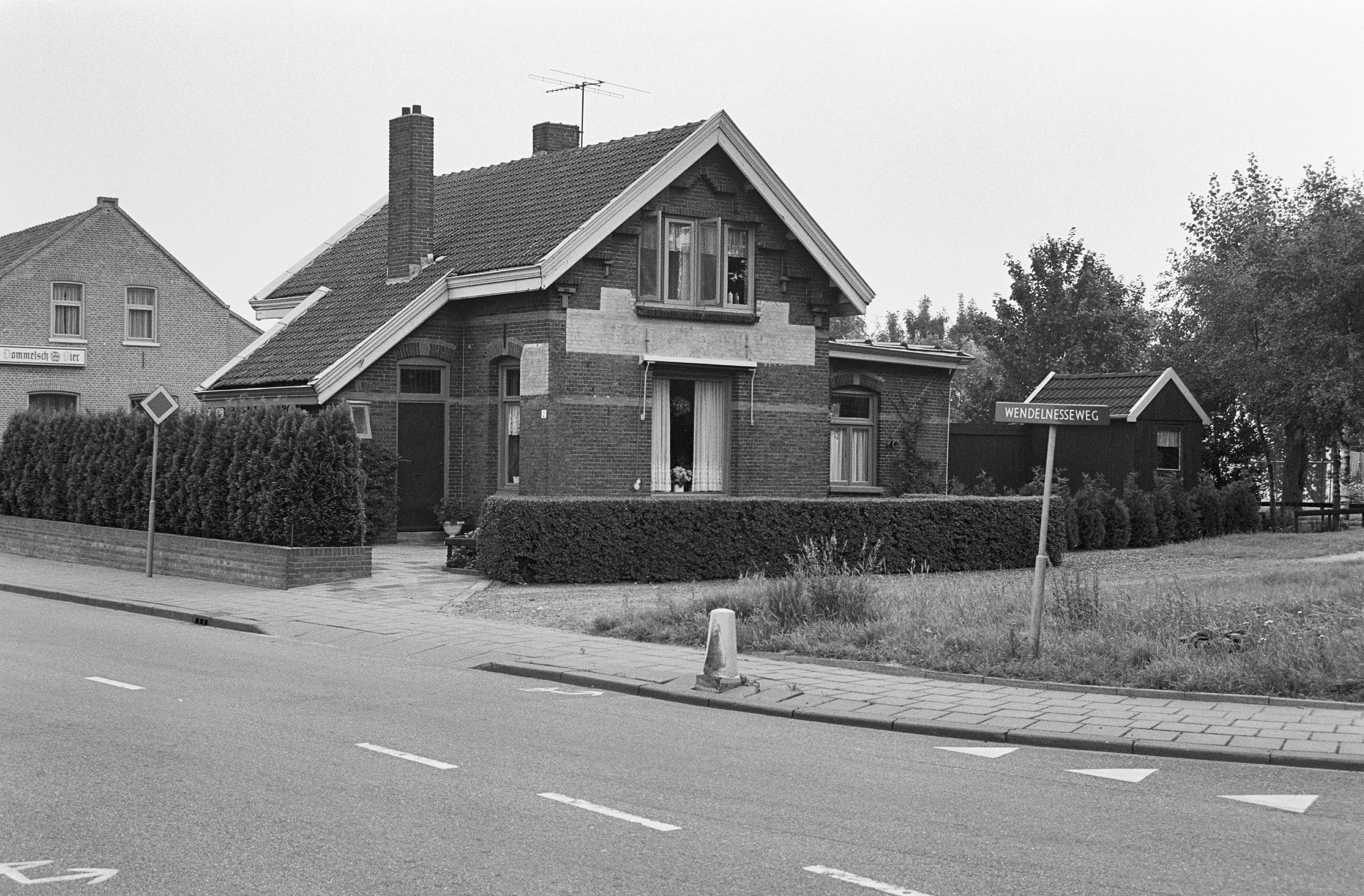
Guard House 22 in 1988.

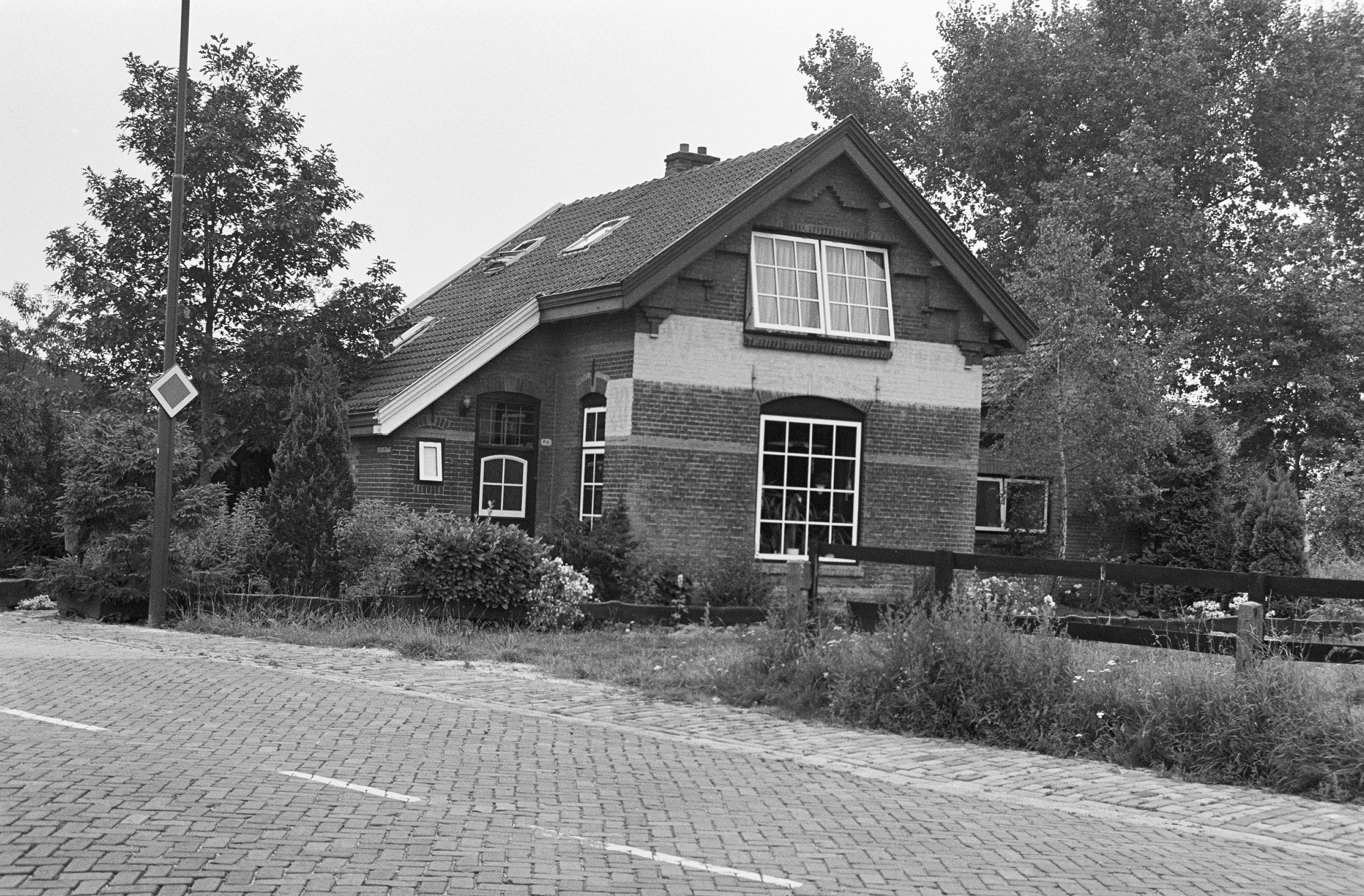
Guard House 20 in 1988.
