= JBZ =

JBZ can refer to:

- Jeroen Bosch Hospital, a hospital in 's-Hertogenbosch, the Netherlands
- Jackson Street Boys, an Asian-American street gang from San Francisco, California, U.S.
- John Ball Zoological Garden, aka "JBZ", a zoo in Grand Rapids, Michigan
