= ZLW =

ZLW is the station code of:

- Lage Zwaluwe railway station, Netherlands
- Whitechapel station, London, England
