= Moerputten Bridge =

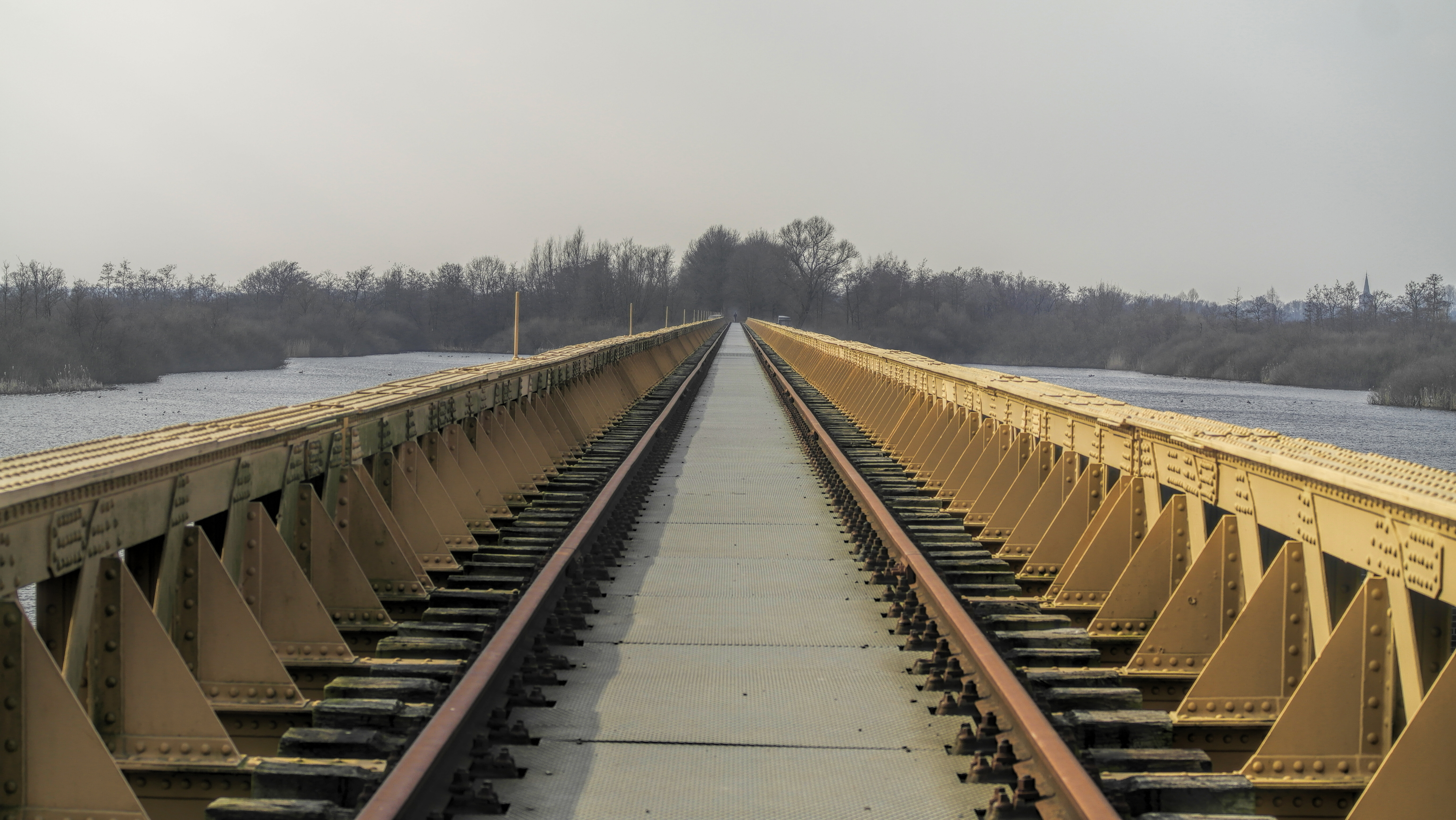
- Coordinates: 51°41′14″N 5°14′52″E

Characteristics
- Total length: 585 m
- Width: 3 m

History
- Construction start: 1881
- Construction end: 1887

The Moerputten Bridge is a former railway bridge near the Dutch city 's-Hertogenbosch. It spans the peat lake 'Lange Putten'.

== Context ==
Moerputten Bridge is located in the area between 's-Hertogenbosch and Vlijmen. Before World War II this was regularly flooded by the overflows in the Meuse dykes. An overflow (overlaat) is a stretch of dyke that is intentionally left lower than other sections. At exceptional or seasonal high water levels, it overflows and relieves the pressure on other dykes, thereby preventing these from breaking.

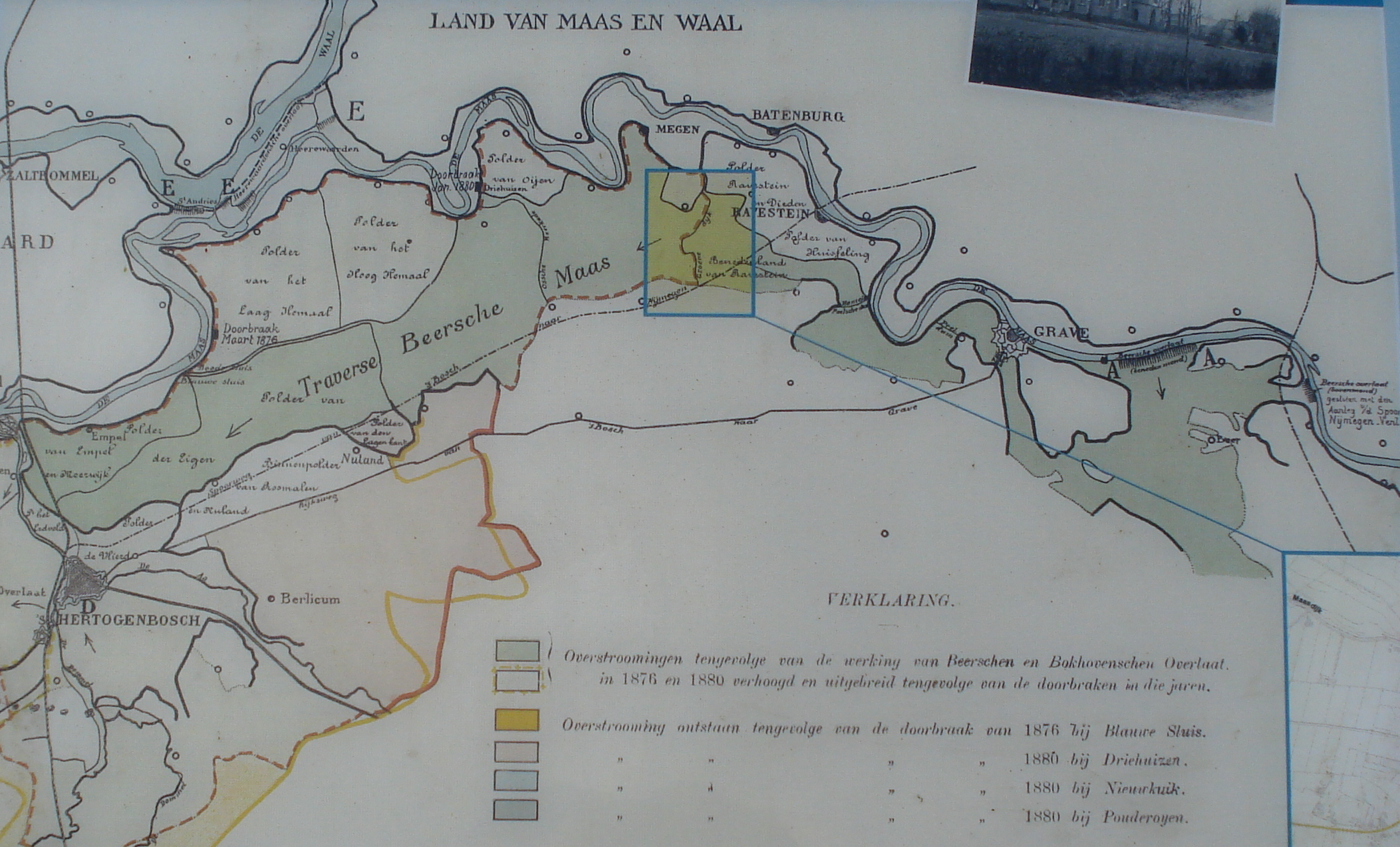
Beerse Maas in green

East of Vlijmen, water would enter the area from the seasonal river Beerse Maas, which was caused by the Beerse Overlaat near Grave (see map). It led to water entering the area from north, and sometimes from south of 's-Hertogenbosch. The second overflow that regularly flooded the area was the Bokhoven Overflow, even though it could also be used as an exit for the Beerse Maas. In January 1880 water from the Bokhoven Overflow entered the area with such force that the big bridge before the Vughterpoort (Vught gate) south of 's-Hertogenbosch was flushed away.

From the first plans for the railroad, it was clear that to cross the area, the railroad would have to be constructed on a high solid dyke. This dyke could not be allowed to block the flood plain of the overflows, because that would necessitate reinforcement of dykes in a very wide area. Therefore, the railroad would need to be constructed with so many openings that the overflows could flood the land without obstruction.

== History ==
In 1875 a law called for the construction of the Lage Zwaluwe-'s-Hertogenbosch railway. Between Vlijmen and 's-Hertogenbosch the railroad would be constructed at 7.5 m above Amsterdam Ordnance Datum. It meant that it would be constructed on a railroad dyke. Two openings were planned in the dyke. The Moerputten Bridge of 510 m long, and the Venkant Bridge of 30 m long.

The bridge was in use as railway bridge on the Lage Zwaluwe-'s-Hertogenbosch railway from 1887 until 1972.

== Current Situation ==
In 1995 Moerputten bridge became a monument. Two years later Staatsbosbeheer bought the bridge and the area around it. They restored the bridge to the original state in 2004.

Moerputten bridge is now part of a footpath which has been constructed on the former railroad dyke. It stretches from the Jeroen Bosch Hospital in 's-Hertogenbosch to Vlijmen.
