= Antwerp–Lage Zwaluwe railway =

Railway line in Belgium and the Netherlands

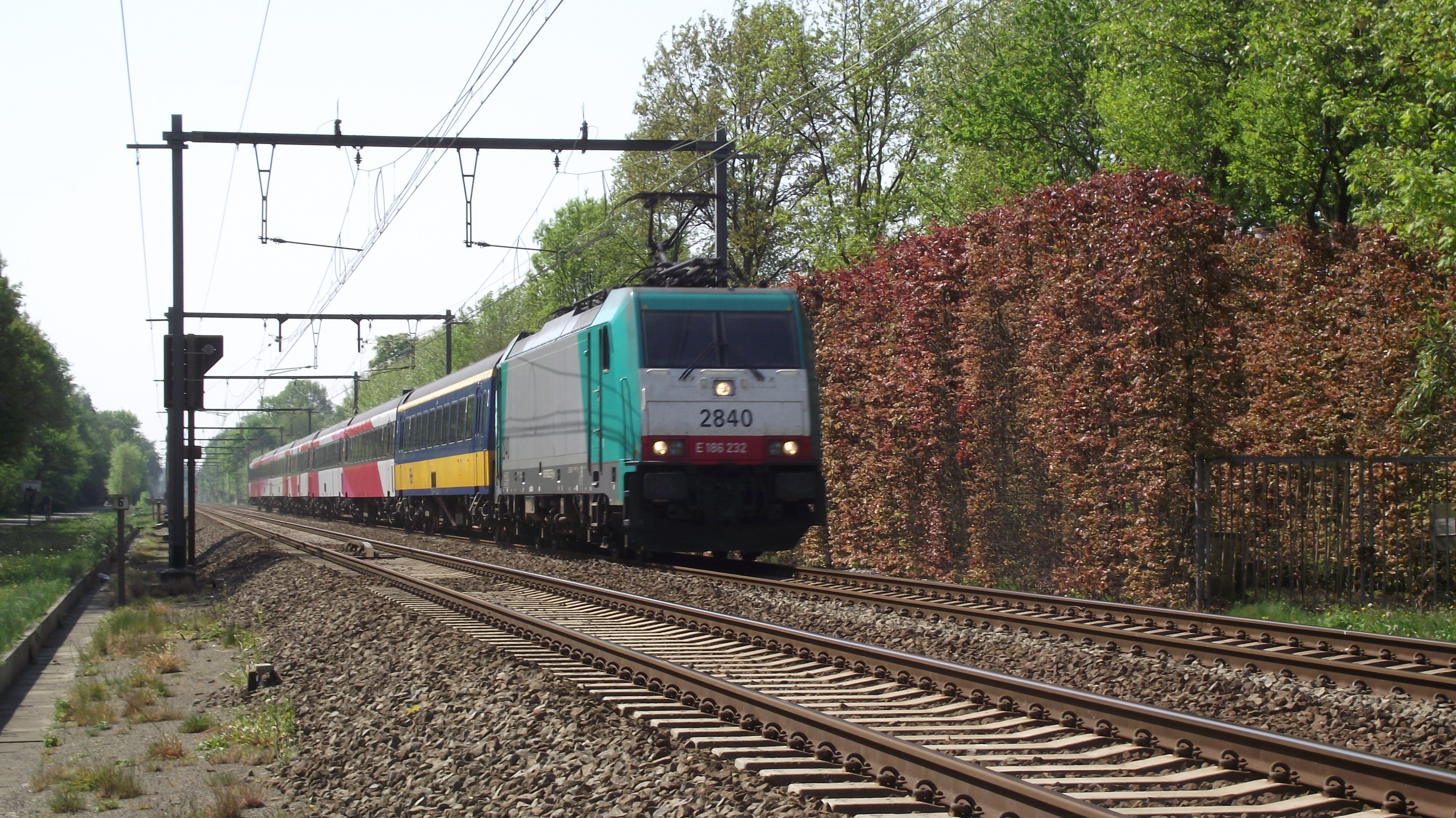
- A Benelux train at Kapellen in 2011

Overview
- Status: Operational
- Locale: Netherlands and Belgium
- Termini: Antwerpen-Centraal railway station; Lage Zwaluwe railway station

Service
- Operator(s): National Railway Company of Belgium, Nederlandse Spoorwegen

History
- Opened: 1854-1876

Technical
- Line length: 64 km (40 mi)
- Number of tracks: double track
- Track gauge: 1,435 mm (4 ft 8 1/2 in) standard gauge
- Electrification: 3 kV DC (Antwerpen–Essen); 1.5 kV DC (Essen–Lage Zwaluwe)
Route map
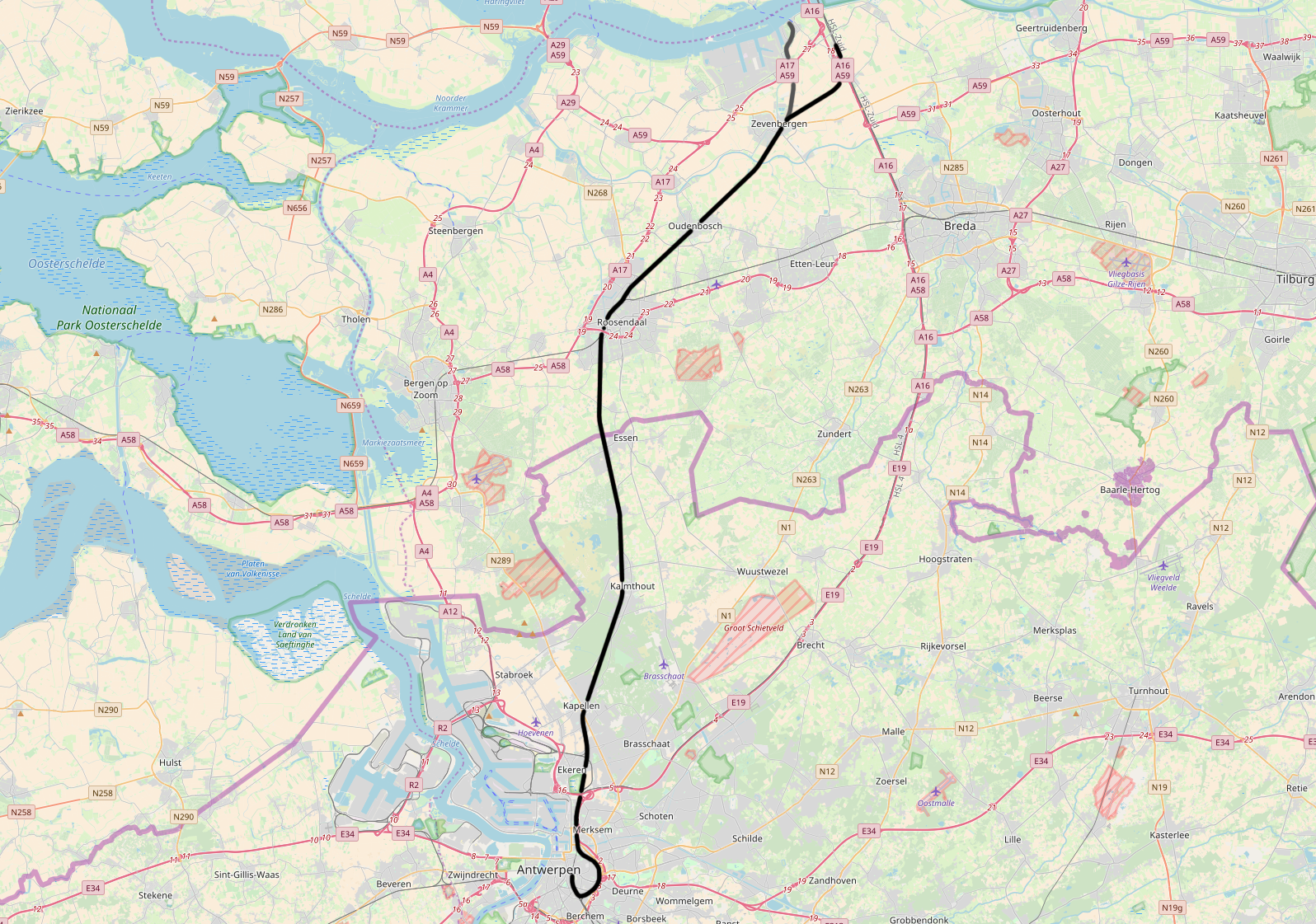

The Antwerp–Lage Zwaluwe railway (railway line 12 in the Belgian numbering plan) is an international railway line running from Antwerp in Belgium to Lage Zwaluwe in the Netherlands. The line was opened between 1854 and 1876. The opening of the high speed lines HSL 4 and HSL-Zuid in 2009 has decreased its importance for international passenger traffic. there is still a local international NMBS S32 train from Roosendaal to Puurs via Antwerp central once an hour along with a few other Belgian domestic IC/ and a second hourly S32 but only as far as Essen station.

== Stations ==
The main interchange stations on the Antwerp–Lage Zwaluwe railway are:

- Antwerpen-Centraal railway station: to Brussels, Ghent, Herentals and Hasselt
- Roosendaal: to Vlissingen and Breda
- Lage Zwaluwe: to Dordrecht, Rotterdam and Breda
