= Lage Zwaluwe railway station =

Railway station in the Netherlands

Lage Zwaluwe
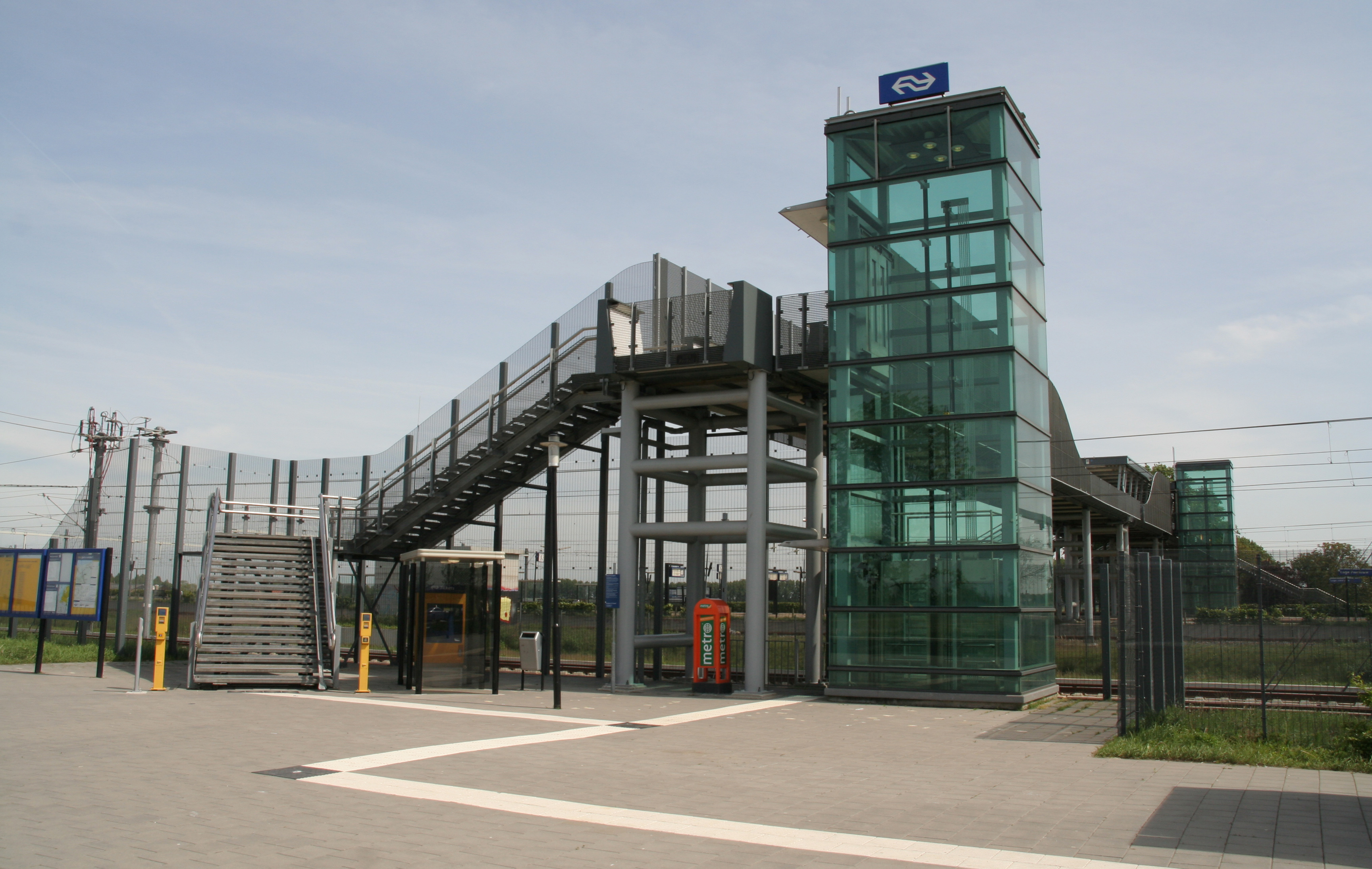

General information
- Location: Netherlands
- Coordinates: 51°41′26″N 4°39′48″E
- Lines: Antwerp–Lage Zwaluwe railway Breda–Rotterdam railway

Other information
- Station code: Zlw

History
- Opened: 1883

Services
| Preceding station | Nederlandse Spoorwegen | Following station |
|---|---|---|
| Dordrecht Zuid towards Dordrecht | NS Sprinter 5900 | Zevenbergen towards Roosendaal |
| Dordrecht Zuid towards Dordrecht | NS Sprinter 6600 Mon-Sat until 19:00 | Breda-Prinsenbeek towards Arnhem Centraal |
| Dordrecht Zuid towards Dordrecht | NS Sprinter 6600 After 19:00 and Sun | Breda-Prinsenbeek towards Nijmegen |
Location
- Location within Netherlands

Lage Zwaluwe is a railway station near Lage Zwaluwe and Moerdijk, Netherlands. The station was opened in 1883 and is located on the Breda–Rotterdam railway between Breda and Dordrecht and the Antwerp–Lage Zwaluwe railway. The services are operated by Nederlandse Spoorwegen.

It is situated in the municipality of Moerdijk.

== Destinations ==
=== Current destinations ===
The following major destinations are directly possible from Lage Zwaluwe: Dordrecht, Breda, 's-Hertogenbosch and Roosendaal (see Train services below).

=== Former destinations ===
Lage Zwaluwe railway station is the start point of the defunct Lage Zwaluwe-'s-Hertogenbosch railway via Waalwijk, which now runs no further than Oosterhout and only for freight.

== Train services ==
The following services currently call at Lage Zwaluwe:

- 2x per hour local service (sprinter) Dordrecht - Breda - Tilburg - 's-Hertogenbosch - Arnhem
- 2x per hour local service (sprinter) Dordrecht - Roosendaal
