= Cromvoirt =

- Village
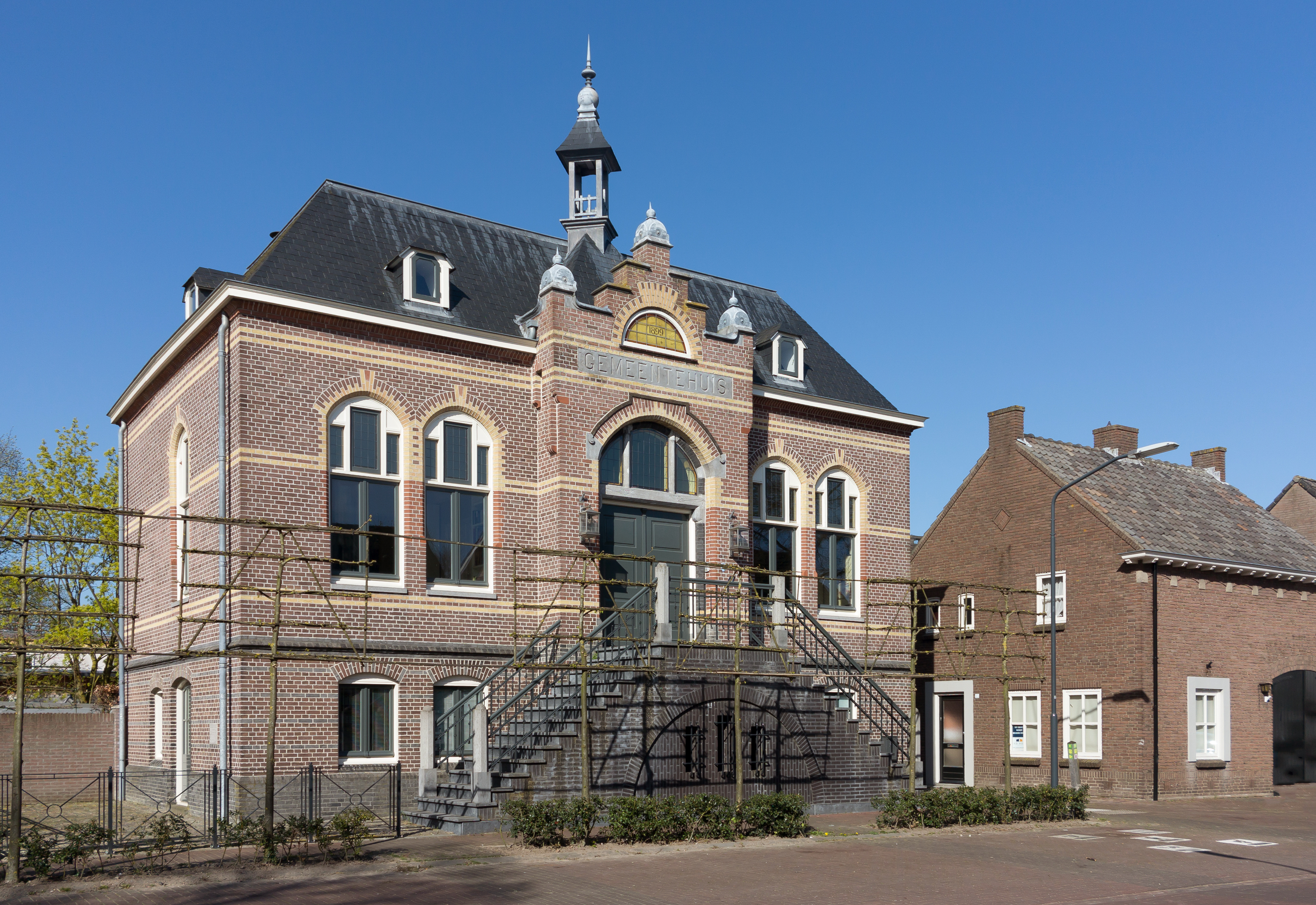
- Former town hall

- Flag Coat of arms

- Location in the province of North Brabant in the Netherlands Cromvoirt (Netherlands)
- Coordinates: 51°40′N 5°14′E
- Country: Netherlands
- Province: North Brabant
- Municipality: Vught

Area
  - Total: 6.41 km^{2} (2.47 sq mi)
- Elevation: 6 m (20 ft)

Population (2021)
  - Total: 875
  - Density: 137/km^{2} (354/sq mi)
- Time zone: UTC+1 (CET)
  - Summer (DST): UTC+2 (CEST)
- Postal code: 5266
- Dialing code: 0411

Cromvoirt is a village in the Dutch province of North Brabant. It is located in the municipality of Vught.

== History ==
The village was first mentioned in 1312 as Crumvoert, and means "crooked fordable place".

The Catholic St Lambertus Church was built in 1888. In 1891, the tower was constructed next to the church. The tower was blown up by the Germans in 1944, and only partially restored.

Cromvoirt was home to 393 people in 1840. Cromvoirt was a separate municipality until 1933, when it was merged with Vught. The northern part of the municipality, containing the hamlet Deuteren, became a part of the municipality of 's-Hertogenbosch.

== Gallery ==
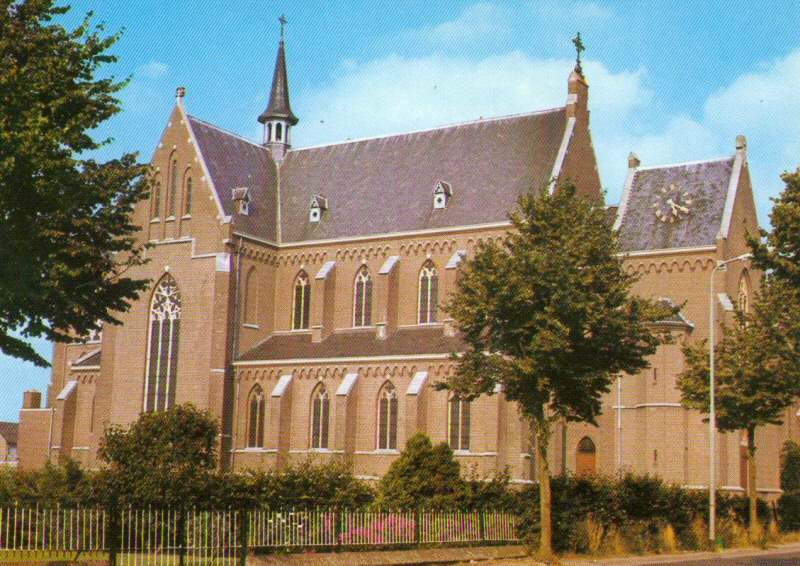
St Lambertus Church

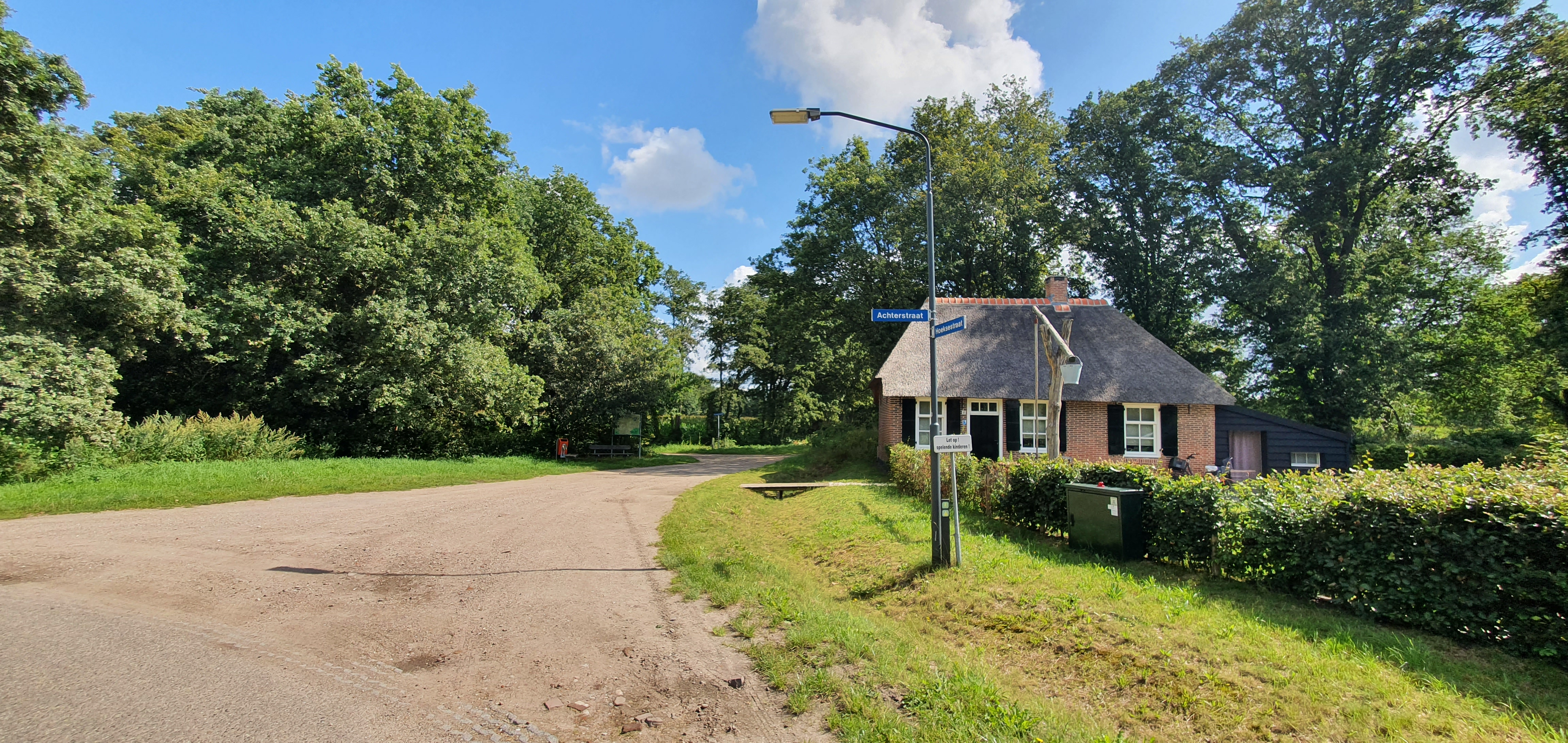
House in Cromvoirt

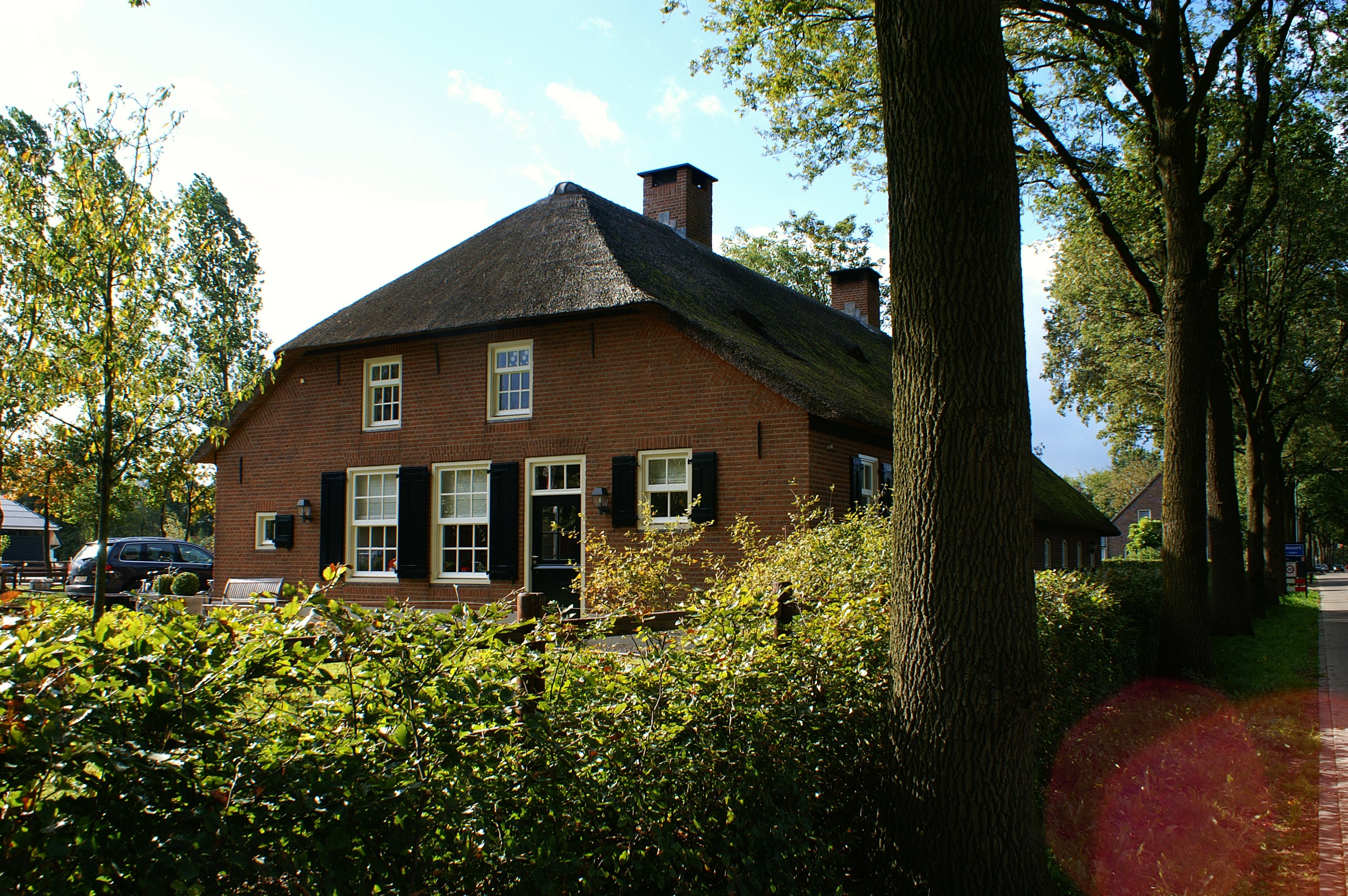
Farm in Cromvoirt
