= Deuteren =

Coordinates: 51°41′12″N 5°16′0″E

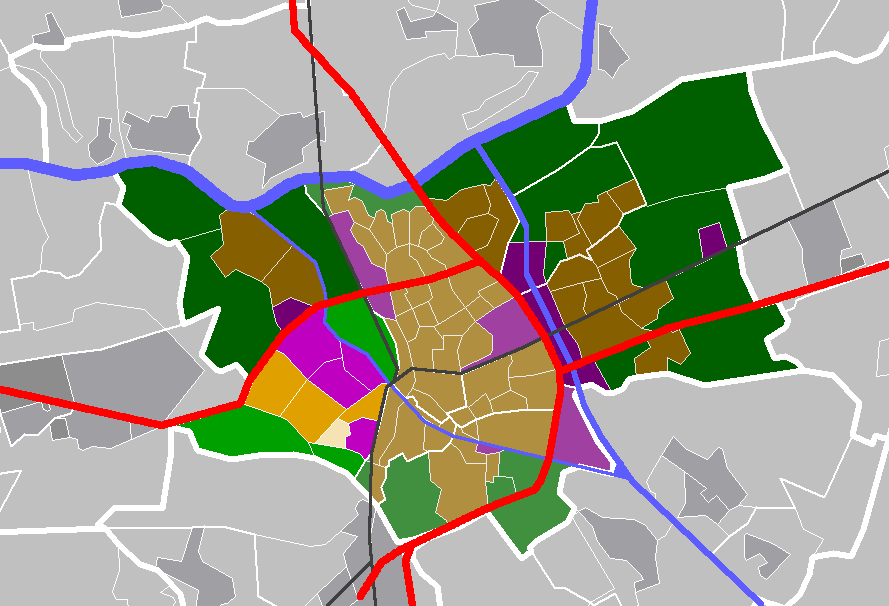
- Country: Netherlands
- Province: North Brabant
- Municipality: 's-Hertogenbosch

Area
  - Total: 0.28 km^{2} (0.11 sq mi)

Population
  - Total: 1,600

Deuteren is a hamlet in the Dutch province of North Brabant. It is located in the municipality of 's-Hertogenbosch, about 2 km west of the city centre.

According to the 19th-century historian A.J. van der Aa, this hamlet was the location of the first Reformed preaching in the area in 1566, by Cornelis van Diest. In the siege of 's-Hertogenbosch in 1629, Deuteren was the location of the headquarters of colonel Pinsen. The hamlet suffered a lot of damage in the year 1757 by high water and ice shelves.

Formerly, the hamlet was divided into two parts: Groot-Deuteren (the current hamlet) and Klein-Deuteren, about 1 km to the northeast. The latter part had shrunk to only one house in the middle of the 19th century; nowadays, a suburb of 's-Hertogenbosch covers the area of Klein-Deuteren.

Deuteren was a part of the municipality of Cromvoirt until that municipality merged with Vught; at that time, Deuteren became a part of 's-Hertogenbosch.
