= Besoijen =

Coordinates: 51°41′N 5°03′E

Besoijen is a former village in the Netherlands. Until 1922, it was a separate municipality, but it is now a neighbourhood of Waalwijk.
