= Jeroen Bosch Hospital =

Jeroen Bosch Ziekenhuis
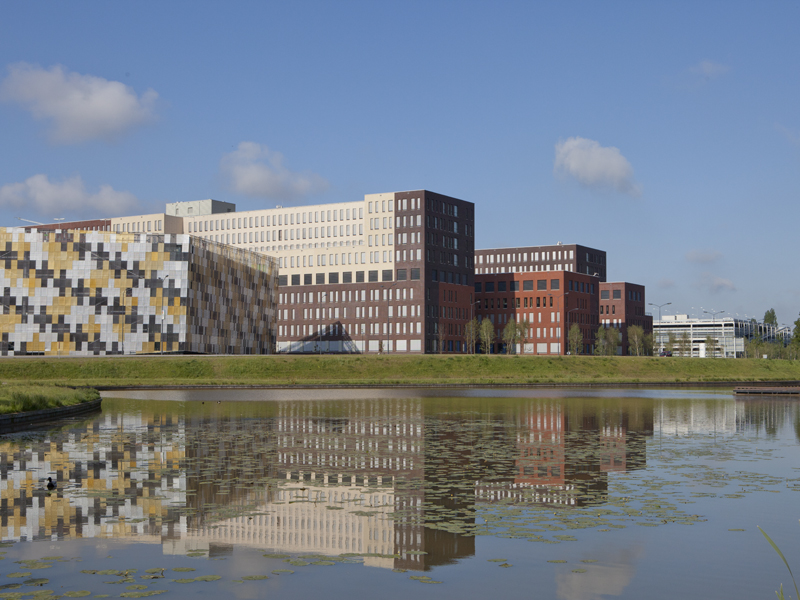

- The Netherlands

Geography
- Location: 's-Hertogenbosch, Boxtel and Zaltbommel, Netherlands
- Coordinates: 51.684555°N 5.277437°E

Organisation
- Type: General

Services
- Emergency department: Yes
- Beds: 1120

Helipads
- Helipad: Yes

History
- Opened: 2011

Links
- Website: https://www.jeroenboschziekenhuis.nl/
- Lists: Hospitals in Netherlands

The Jeroen Bosch Hospital (Dutch: Jeroen Bosch Ziekenhuis, JBZ) is a general hospital in 's-Hertogenbosch. The building at the current location on the Henri Dunantlaan was opened in 2011.

== History ==
=== Created by mergers ===
The Jeroen Bosch Hospital resulted from multiple mergers. First a merger between the originally Protestant Willem-Alexander Hospital and the originally Roman Catholic Groot Ziekengasthuis created the Bosch Medicentrum. Next Bosch Medicentrum merged with the Carolus-Liduina general hospital. The new hospital was named after the most famous citizen of 's-Hertogenbosch, Hieronymus Bosch.

=== Current building ===
At the location of the Willem Alexander hospital construction of a new hospital started in November 2007. It had to be large enough to replace the three former locations in 's-Hertogenbosch. The former Willem-Alexander Hospital was integrated in the new building, and is now used primarily for offices and laboratories. The new building was delivered in December 2010. The hospitals moved in during April and May 2011. The official opening of the new hospital was done by Crown Prince Willem-Alexander on 24 June 2011.

=== Covid-19 / Coronavirus ===
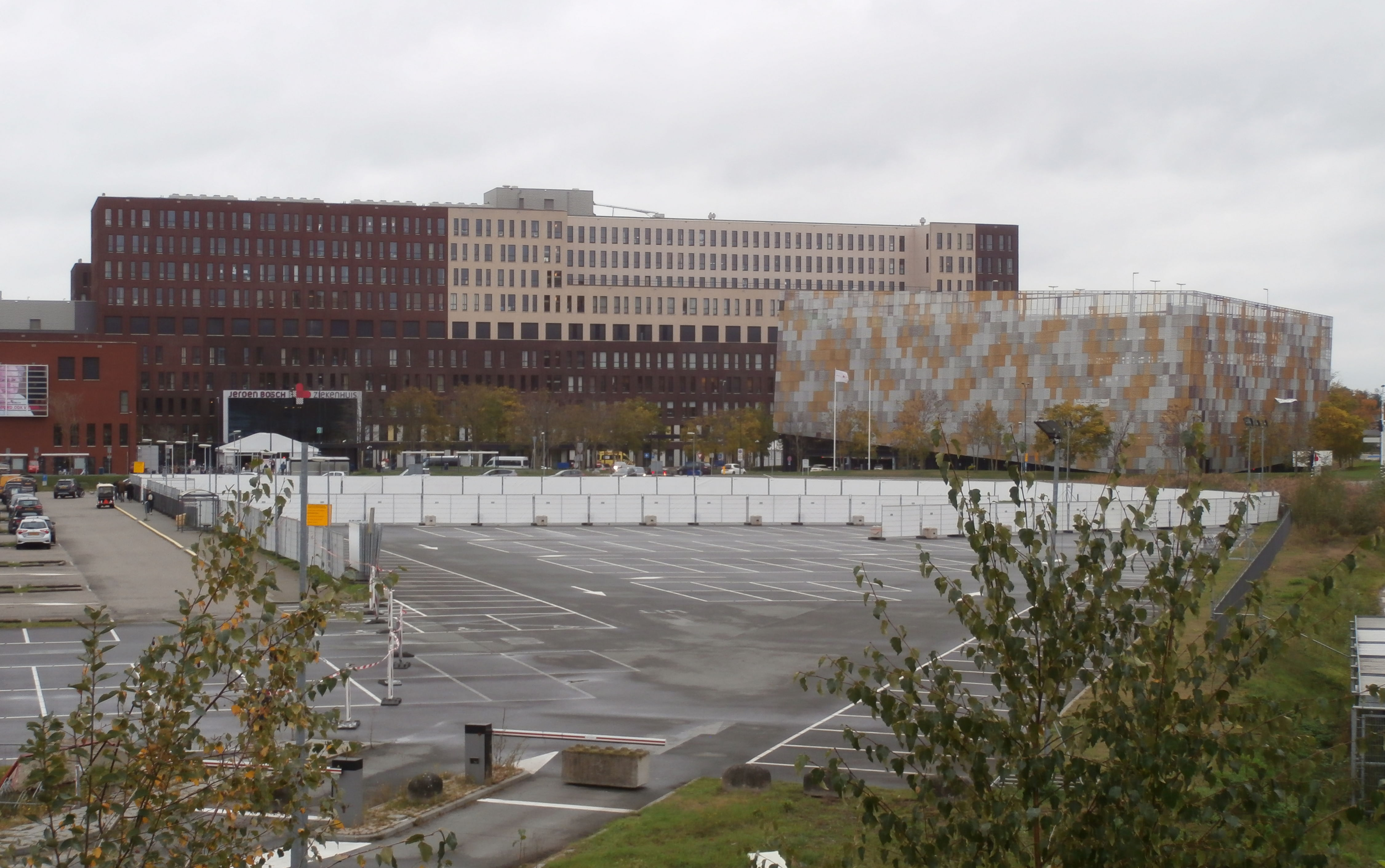
Special Covid-19 heli pad in fall 2020

In the Netherlands the early 2020 outbreak of the coronavirus was especially intense in North Brabant. Many inhabitants had been infected on vacation in Austria and Northern Italy. Next they had spread the virus further during Carnival, which is a feast typical for North Brabant and Limburg. It resulted in a high reproduction rate for the virus in North Brabant, and the Jeroen Bosch Hospital becoming especially busy at the time. The hospital even created a temporary extra helipad to transport patients to other hospitals by helicopter.

One of the reasons the hospital became so busy treating Covid-19 patients, was that inhabitants of North Brabant that got the virus became much more ill than other Dutchmen. This became visible when maps of victims of Q fever and Corona, and the presence of Intensive animal farming were shown side by side. The correlation was clear, but the causality was less clear. Ignas van Bebber, a surgeon of the JBZ was already involved in research of the effects of particulates. He blamed the high amount of ammonia emitted by animal farms for causing permanent damage to the lung tissue of people living close by. People in Breda and Tilburg celebrated carnival just as well as the people east of 's-Hertogenbosch. However, the air pollution east of 's-Hertogenbosch caused that people living there were much more likely to die from an infection.

== Services ==
=== Locations ===
The hospital serves an area of 360.000 inhabitants. Therefore there are multiple auxiliary locations in 's-Hertogenbosch and surroundings. Some of them, like the one in Boxtel offer advanced diagnostics. Most of them are simple posts for blood tests, collection of urine or feces samples, or to investigate for possible thrombosis.

- Location 's-Hertogenbosch (Henri Dunantstraat 1) (primary location)
- Location Boxtel (Liduinahof 35)
- Location Drunen (Tinie de Munnikstraat 17)
- Location Rosmalen (De Hoef 90)
- Location Zaltbommel (Kerkstraat 1 en Gamerschestraat 32a)
- Jeroen Bosch Diagnostics (several locations primarily for blood tests in and near 's-Hertogenbosch)
- Sport Medical Center (Marathonloop 9 in 's-Hertogenbosch)
- Thrombosis services (several posts in and near 's-Hertogenbosch)

=== Specializations, research and education ===
The Jeroen Bosch hospital has 4,000 employees and 240 physicians and surgeons in 29 medical specialisms. These offer almost any medical specialism, leading to a yearly total of 500,000 outpatient treatments, and 60,000 inpatient treatments. It also performs research.

Education and training is part of the mission of Jeroen Bosch Hospital. The hospital trains new doctors. I.e. doctors which have already attended university elsewhere learn a medical specialism in the hospital. For new nurses there is a school that combines theoretical and practical education.

The specialist rehabilitation hospital Tolbrug is connected to the hospital. It helps patients to rejoin society after severe disease or injury. As a rehabilitation hospital it stands at some distance from the organization of regular hospital care. E.g. the negotiations with insurance companies about rehabilitation care are done separately. It makes that Tolbrug reports only to the executive board of the hospital, and that it e.g. has a separate entrance near the main entrance of the hospital.
