= Gembloux railway station =

Railway station in Namur, Belgium

Gembloux
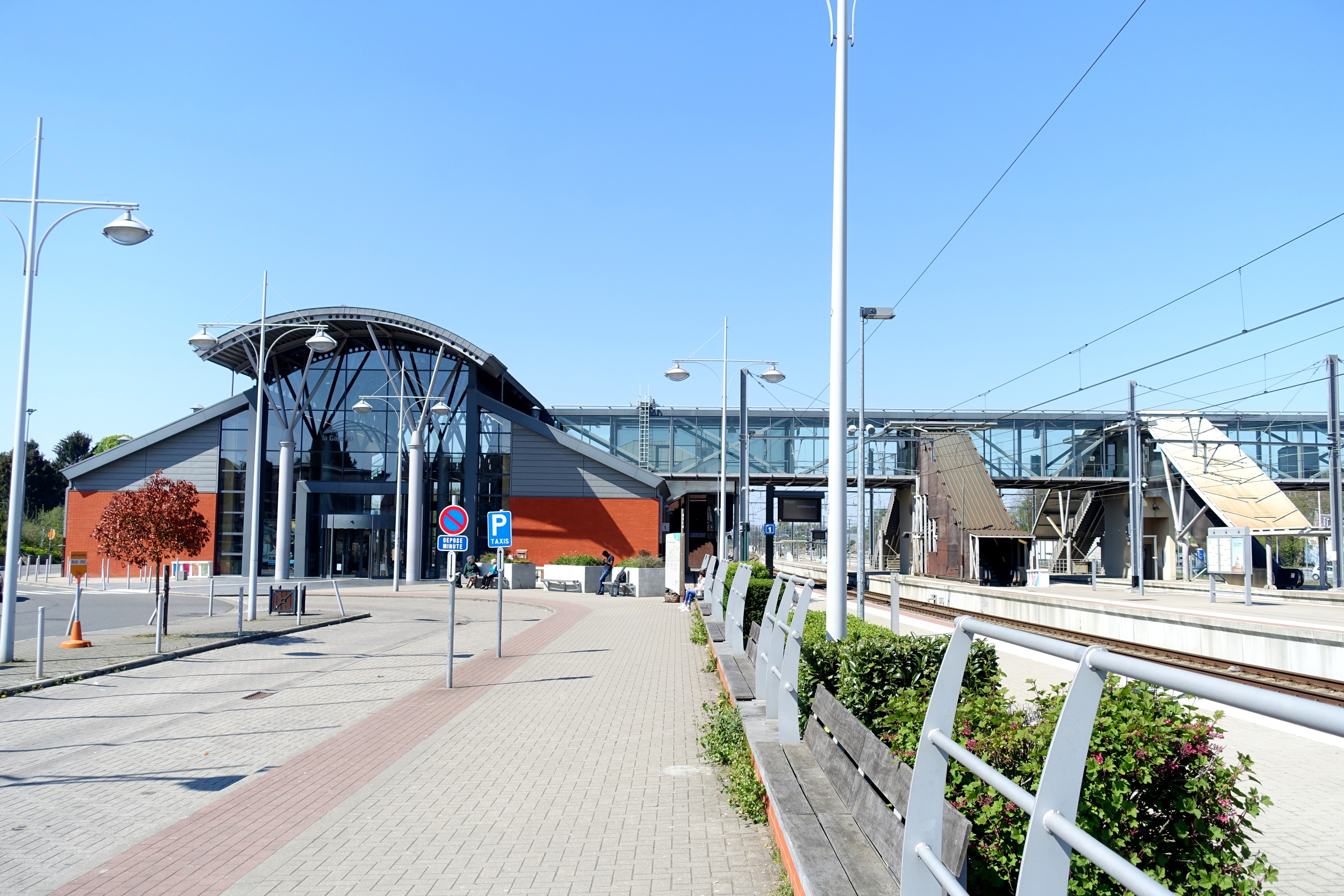
- Gembloux railway station

General information
- Location: Gembloux, Namur; Belgium
- Coordinates: 50°34′14″N 4°41′27″E
- System: Railway Station
- Owner: SNCB/NMBS
- Operator: SNCB/NMBS
- Lines: 144, 147, 161
- Platforms: 5

Other information
- Station code: LGB

History
- Opened: 14 June 1855; 171 years ago
Location
- Location within Belgium Location within Europe

Gembloux railway station (French: Gare de Gembloux; Dutch: Station Gembloers) (Note: Officially Gembloux (French: Gembloux; Dutch: Gembloers)) is a railway station in Gembloux, Namur, Belgium. The station was opened on 14 June 1855 by the Grande Compagnie de Luxembourg on railway lines 144, 147 and 161. It is operated by the National Railway Company of Belgium (SNCB/NMBS).

The station is primarily used by commuters travelling into nearby Brussels (40 minutes away) and Namur (10 minutes away). It has curved platforms allowing for high-speed rail to pass through without problem, allowing for speeds up to 200 km/h. The station itself is currently under expansion due to the high number of users from the growing population of Gembloux.

== Train services ==
The station is served by the following services:

- Intercity services (IC-16) Brussels - Namur - Arlon - Luxembourg
- Intercity services (IC-17) Brussels Airport - Brussels-Luxembourg - Namur - Dinant (weekdays)
- Intercity services (IC-17) Brussels - Namur - Dinant (weekends)
- Intercity services (IC-18) Brussels - Namur - Liege (weekdays)
- Local services (L-08) Ottignies - Gembloux - Namur

| Preceding station | NMBS/SNCB | Following station |
|---|---|---|
| Ottignies towards Bruxelles-Midi / Brussel-Zuid | IC 16 | Namur towards Luxembourg |
| Ottignies towards Brussels National Airport | IC 17 weekdays | Namur towards Dinant |
| Ottignies towards Bruxelles-Midi / Brussel-Zuid | IC 17 weekends | Namur towards Dinant |
| Ottignies towards Bruxelles-Midi / Brussel-Zuid | IC 18 weekdays | Namur towards Liège-Saint-Lambert |
| Ernage towards Ottignies | L 08 | Lonzée towards Namur |

== Gallery ==
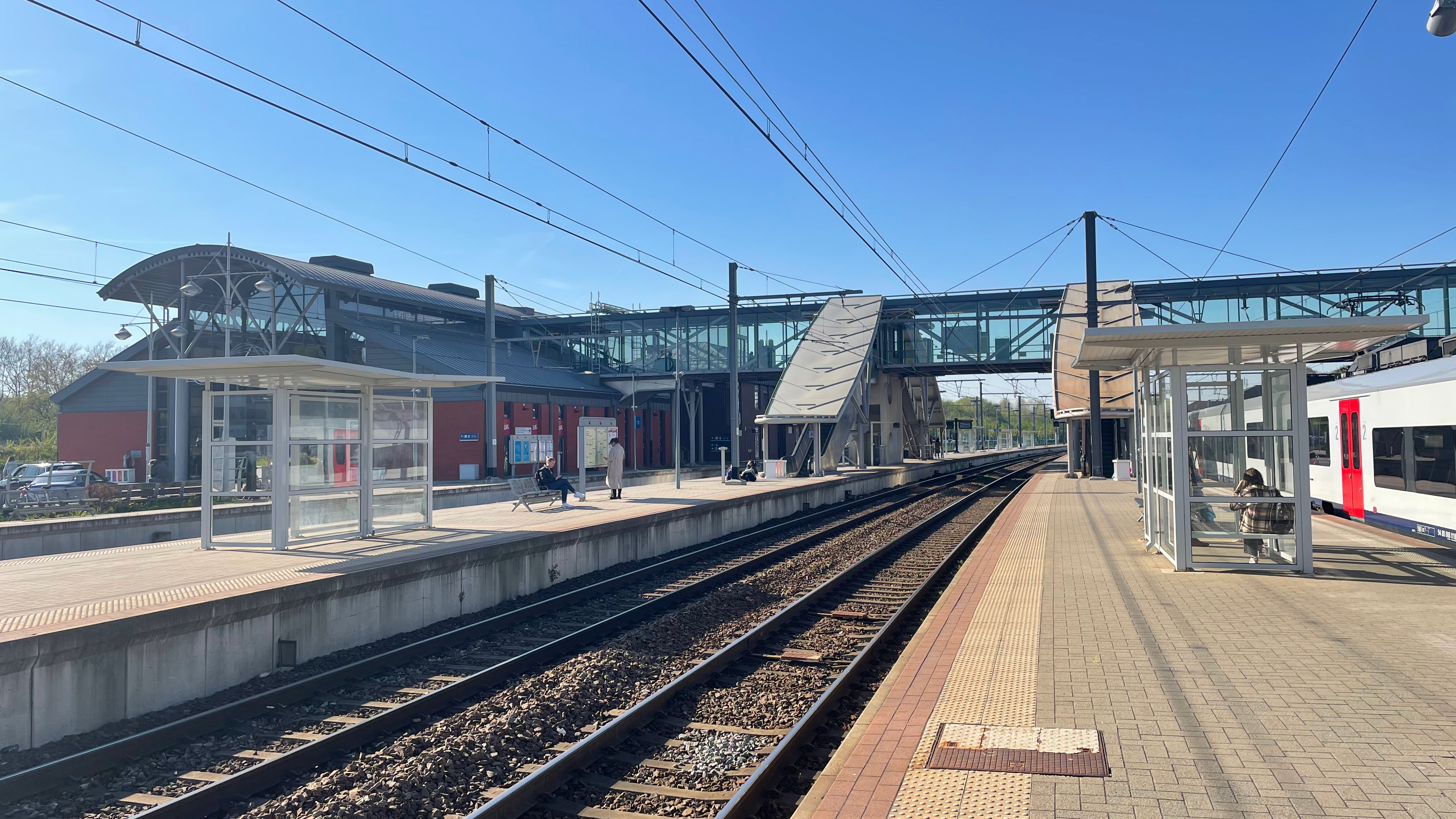
View of the platforms and tracks

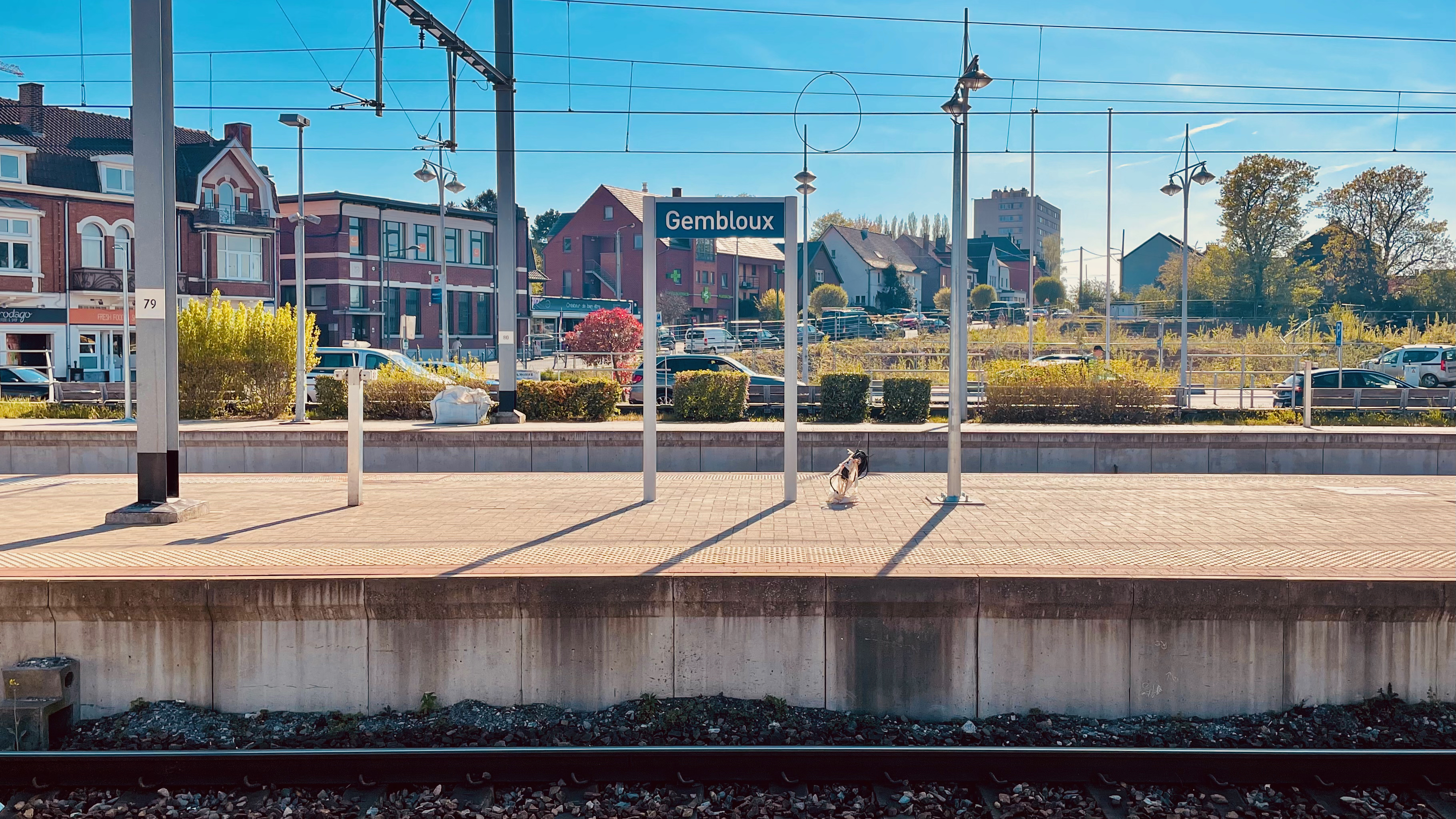
Place name sign on a platform

== See also ==
- List of railway stations in Belgium
- Rail transport in Belgium
