= Faux railway station =

Railway station in Walloon Brabant, Belgium

Faux
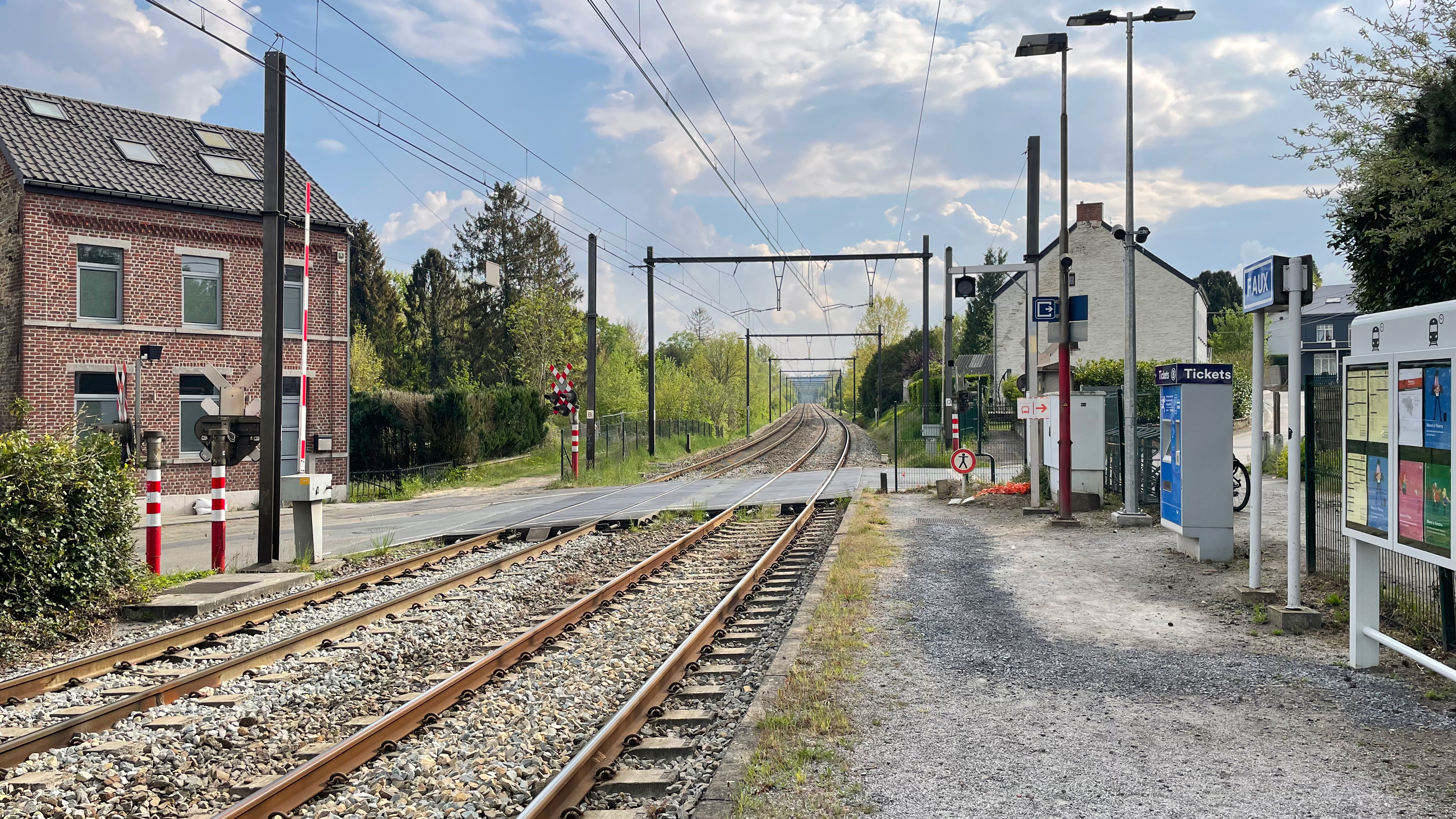
- Faux railway station

General information
- Location: Faux, Walloon Brabant, Belgium
- Coordinates: 50°37′17″N 4°32′55″E
- System: Railway Station
- Owner: National Railway Company of Belgium
- Line: 140
- Platforms: 2
- Tracks: 2

History
- Opened: 1 August 1901
Location

Faux is a railway station in Faux, Court-Saint-Étienne, Walloon Brabant, Belgium. It opened in 1901 on the Line 140 (Ottignies - Fleurus - Charleroi).

== Location ==
The railway station is located in Faux, Court-Saint-Étienne, Walloon Brabant, Belgium. Faux station is located at kilometric point 7.30 on line 140, from Ottignies to Marcinelle (Charleroi), between the stations of Court-Saint-Étienne and La Roche.

== History ==
The Belgian State Railways Administration put the stopping point of Faux into service on 1 August 1901. It was originally a simple stopping point depending on the station of La Roche.

In 1909, this stopping point became a full stop; a building, equipped with a counter and facilities for unloading parcels and goods, was built at this time.

Faux became an unstaffed stopping point again in 1964. The station building has since been demolished.

== Service ==
Faux is served by SNCB Suburban (S61) (Réseau express régional de Charleroi), Heure de pointe ("Rush Hour") (P) and Tourist ("Touristiques") (ICT) trains moving on line 140 (Charleroi-Sud - Ottignies).

During the week, the service includes:

- S61 trains between Namur or Jambes and Ottignies via Charleroi-Sud (every hour); every day, three trains are extended toward Wavre or Basse-Wavre;
- Three additional S61 trains between Charleroi-Sud and Ottignies (in the morning);
- Three additional S61 trains between Ottignies and Charleroi-Sud (late afternoon).
- On weekends and public holidays, the service consists of S61 trains between Namur and Ottignies via Charleroi-Sud (every two hours).

During holidays, a single ICT train connects Charleroi-Sud to Bierges-Walibi and Wavre, in the morning, with a return trip in the evening.

Preceding station	NMBS/SNCB	Following station
Court-Saint-Etienne towards Ottignies	L 14	Charleroi-Sud towards Jambes
