= Jambes railway station =

Railway station in Namur, Belgium

Jambes
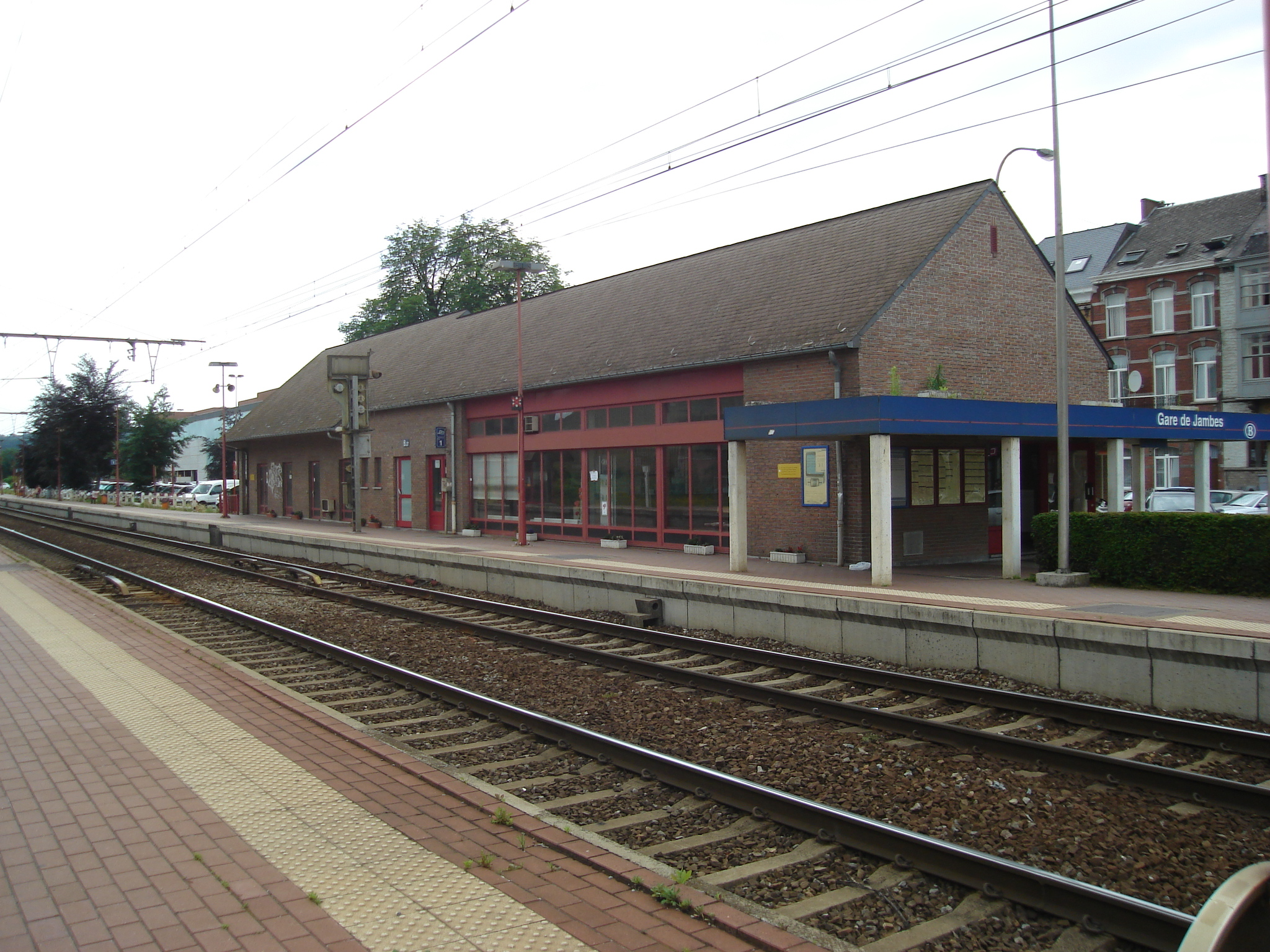
- Jambes railway station

General information
- Location: Jambes, Namur; Belgium
- Coordinates: 50°27′17″N 4°52′33″E
- System: Railway Station
- Owner: SNCB/NMBS
- Operator: SNCB/NMBS
- Line: 154
- Platforms: 3

Other information
- Station code: NJ

History
- Opened: 5 February 1862; 164 years ago

Passengers
- 980
Location
- Location within Belgium Location within Europe

Jambes railway station (French: Gare de Jambes; Dutch: Station Jambes) (Note: Officially Jambes) is a railway station in Jambes, Namur, Belgium. The station is operated by the National Railway Company of Belgium (SNCB/NMBS). It should not be confused with Jambes-East railway station, just a few minutes' walk to the east, which is on railway line 162.

== Train services ==
The station is served by the following services:

- Intercity services (IC 17) Dinant - Jambes - Namur - Schaarbeek
- Local services Jambes - Ottignies

== Gallery ==
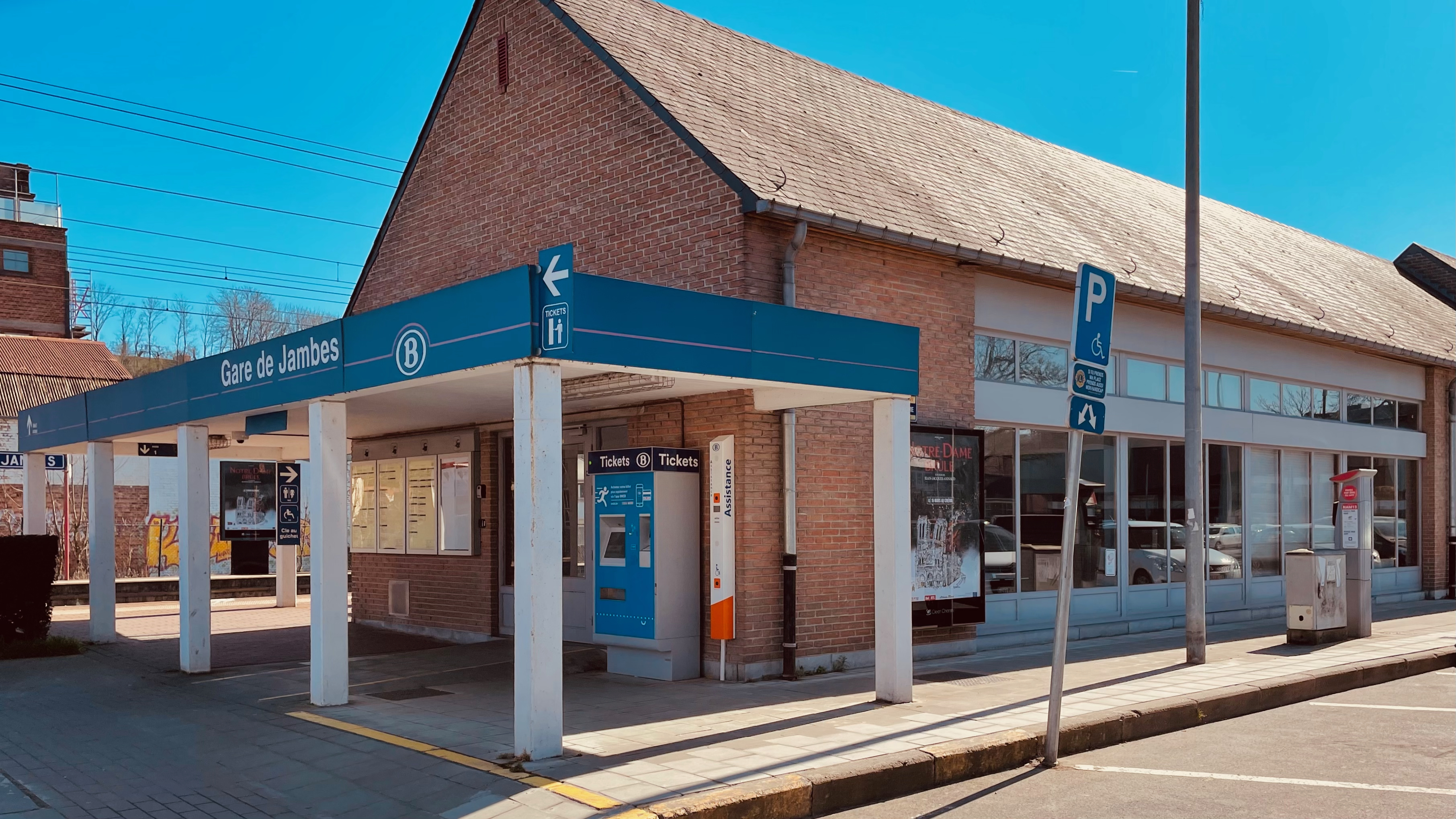
Frontal view

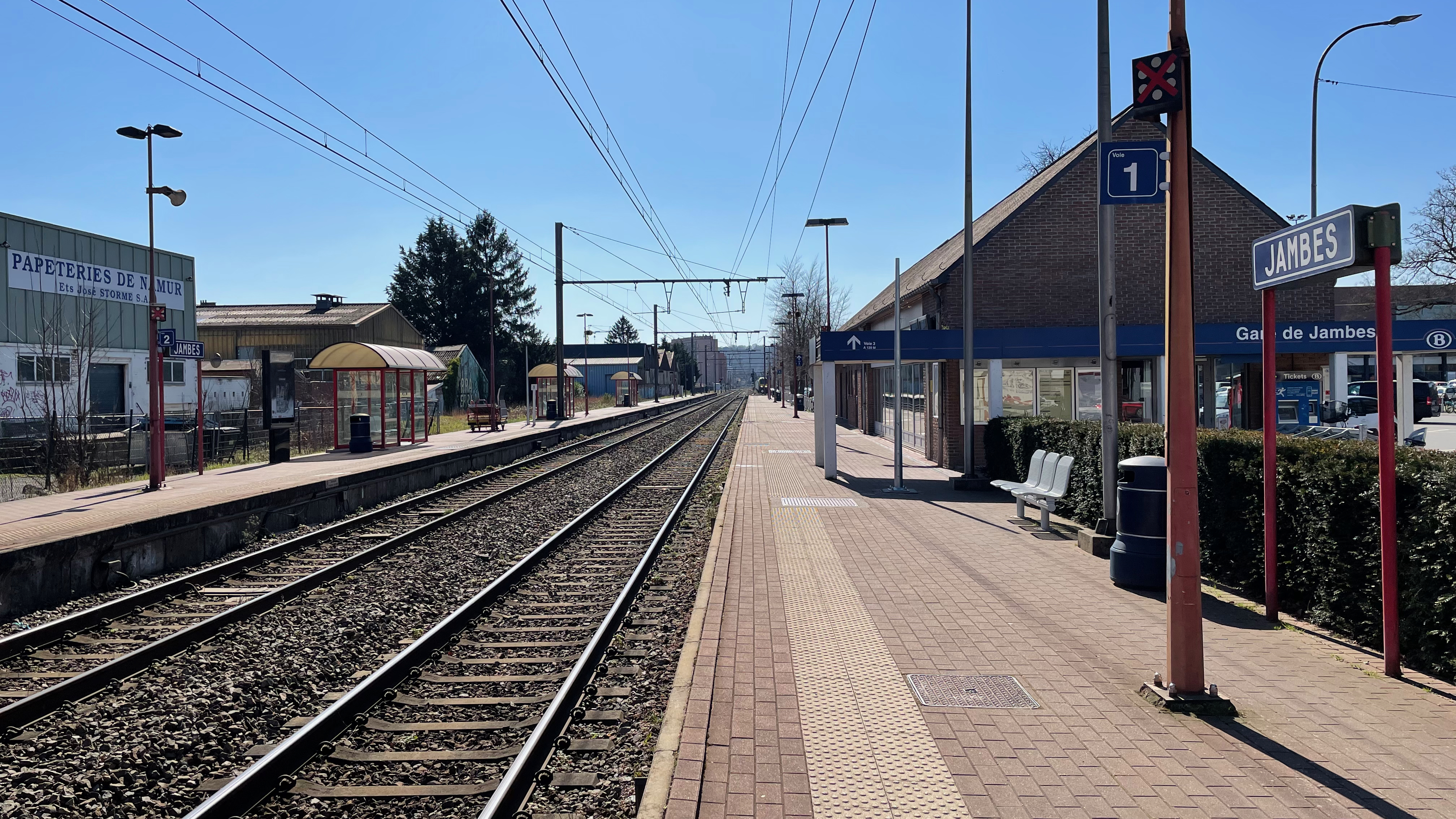
View of the platforms and tracks

== See also ==
- List of railway stations in Belgium
- Rail transport in Belgium
