= Genval railway station =

Railway station in Walloon Brabant, Belgium

Genval
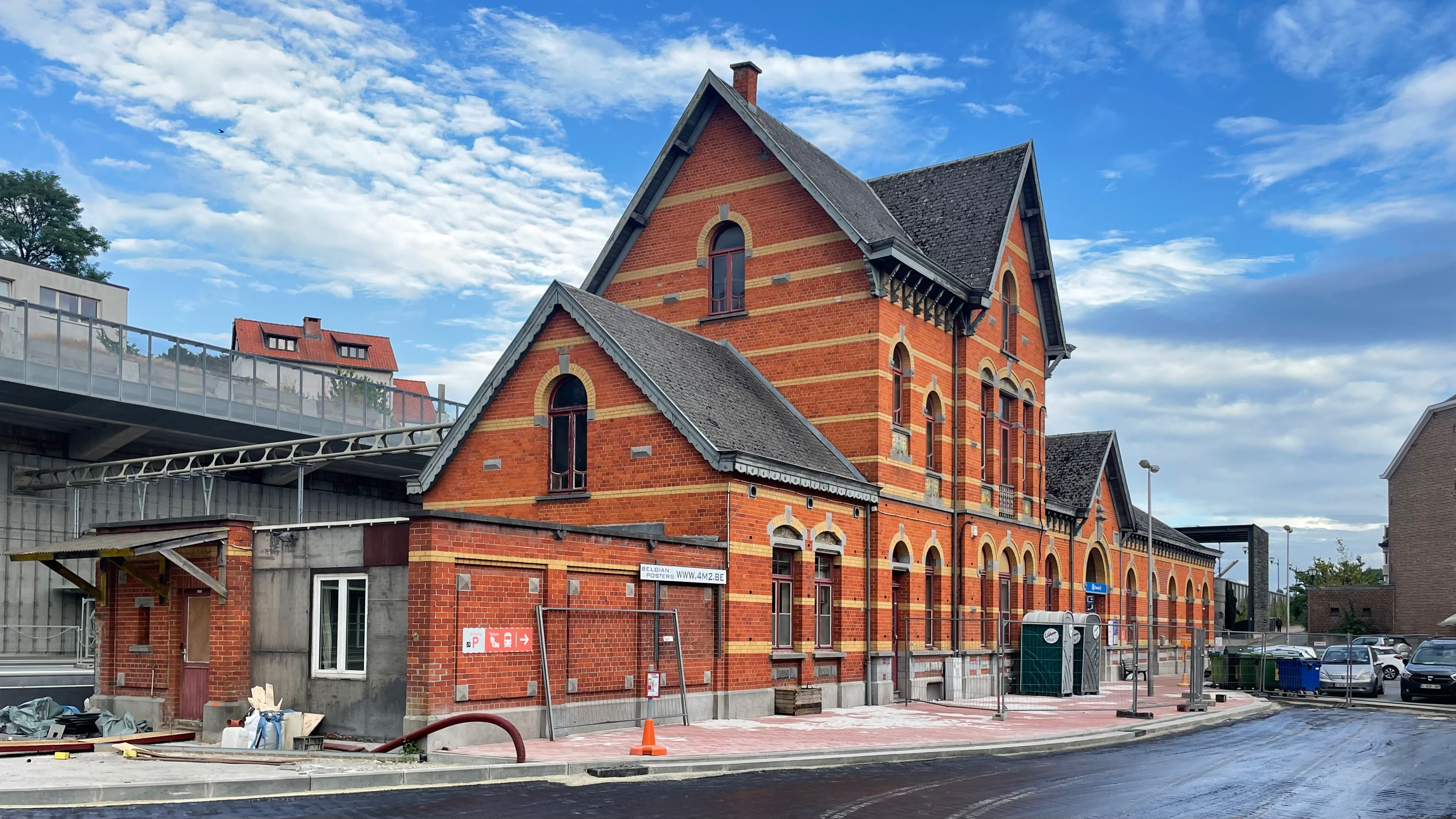
- Genval railway station

General information
- Location: Genval, Walloon Brabant; Belgium
- Coordinates: 50°43′32″N 4°30′55″E
- System: Railway Station
- Owner: SNCB/NMBS
- Operator: SNCB/NMBS
- Line: 161
- Platforms: 3
- Tracks: 3

History
- Opened: 2 June 1889; 137 years ago
Location
- Location within Belgium Location within Europe

Genval railway station (French: Gare de Genval; Dutch: Station Genval) (Note: Officially Genval) is a railway station in Genval, Walloon Brabant, Belgium. The station opened in 1889 on railway line 161 between Brussels and Namur. It is operated by the National Railway Company of Belgium (SNCB/NMBS).

== History ==
=== Early history ===
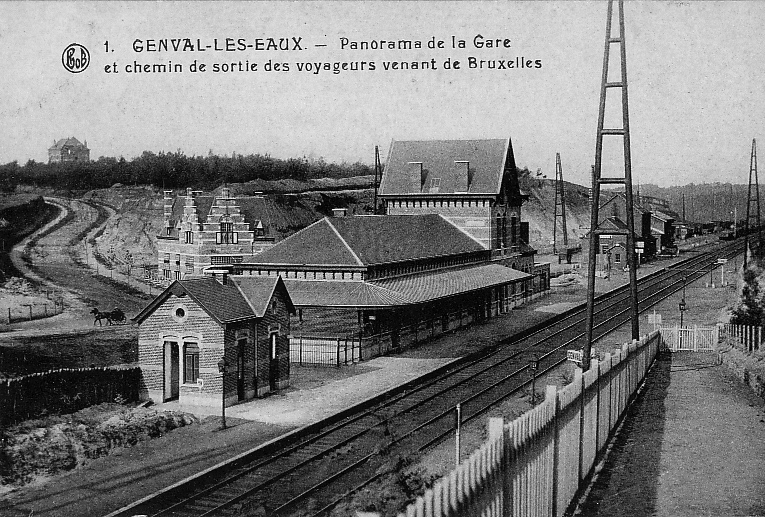
The first and second Genval railway stations, pictured c. 1920

The first railway station, probably built around 1900, was of the "Belgian State Halt Plan 1893" type, with a central body with four openings framed by two small asymmetrical wings, very similar to the one that had been built at the village of Profondsart. It later became the goods station building. The second (current) eclectic-style railway station was erected near the first around 1910, as attested by the inscription "Anno 1910" above the main entrance. It was designed by the architect G. De Lulle, who adapted the characteristics of the bourgeois villa to railway use. It has a number of similarities with Jurbise railway station.

=== 21st century ===
At the beginning of the 21st century, the construction of the four-track line between Watermael-Boitsfort and Ottignies required major redevelopment work at the station. The project included a large multi-storey car park with 570 spaces, built partly above the tracks. The car park allows direct access to the platforms via stairs or lifts. A bus station was then built on the site of the old car park. The development is complemented by bicycles facilities and short-term parking spaces. The civil engineering work on this site was carried out between 2009 and 2013. During this work, the first station building and the goods halls were demolished.

== Architecture ==
The station's architectural style is eclectic with Art Nouveau decorative elements. The building, made of orange and yellow bricks, consists of a high central building with a low-rise extension on each side. The station's rear façade presents a wrought iron canopy with a porch roof (or glass porch) typical of the Belle Époque.

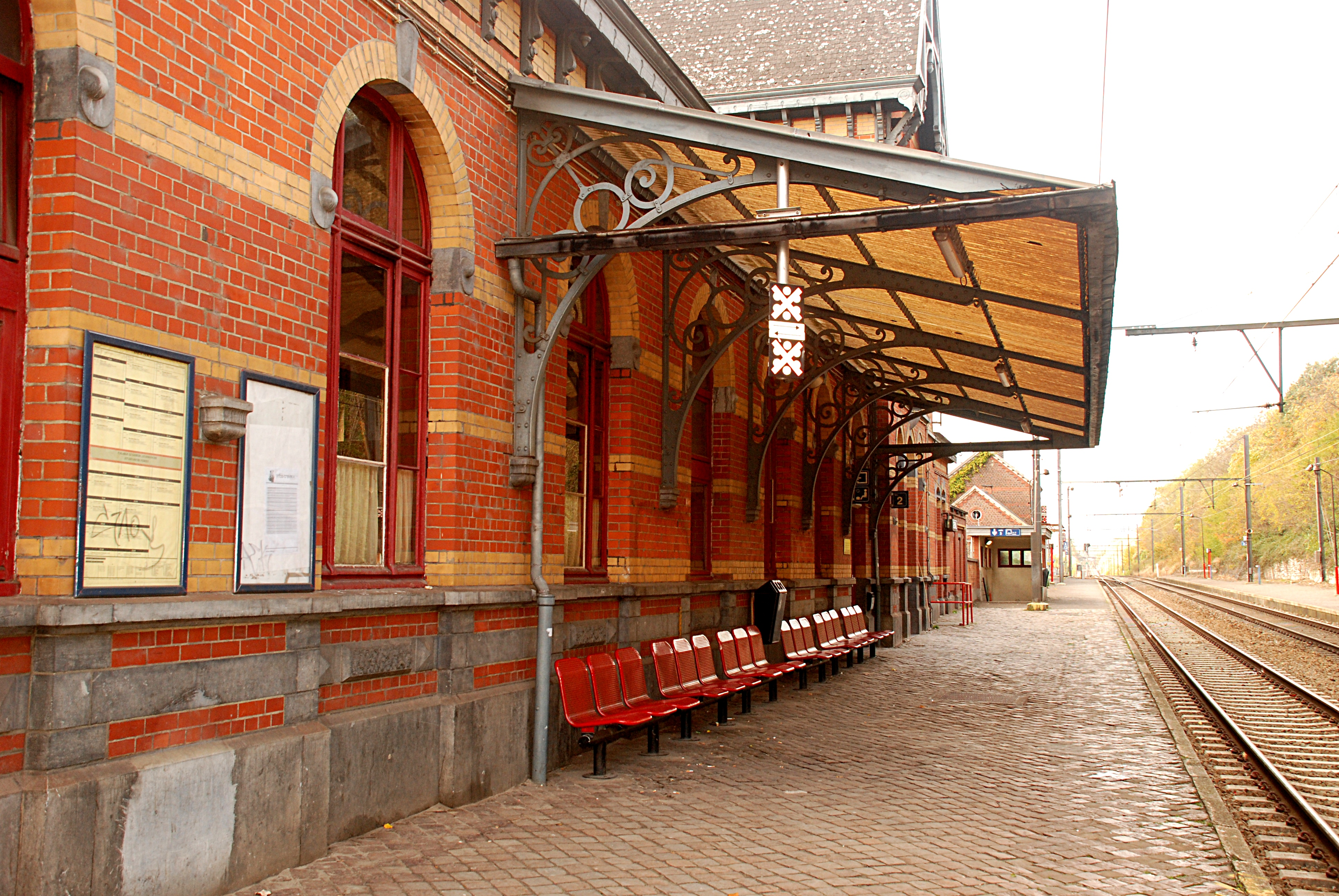
Porch roof

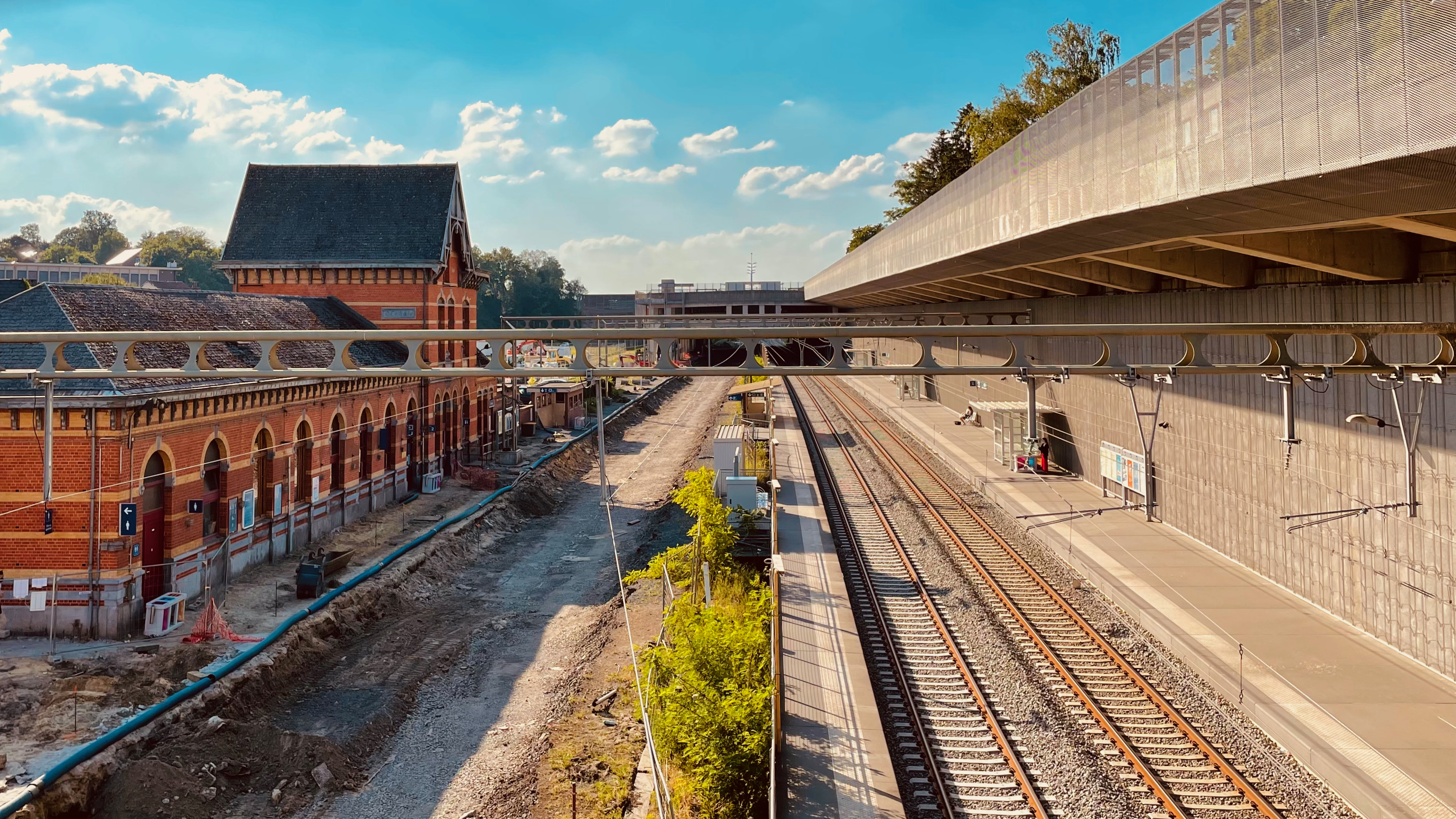
Looking down at the tracks

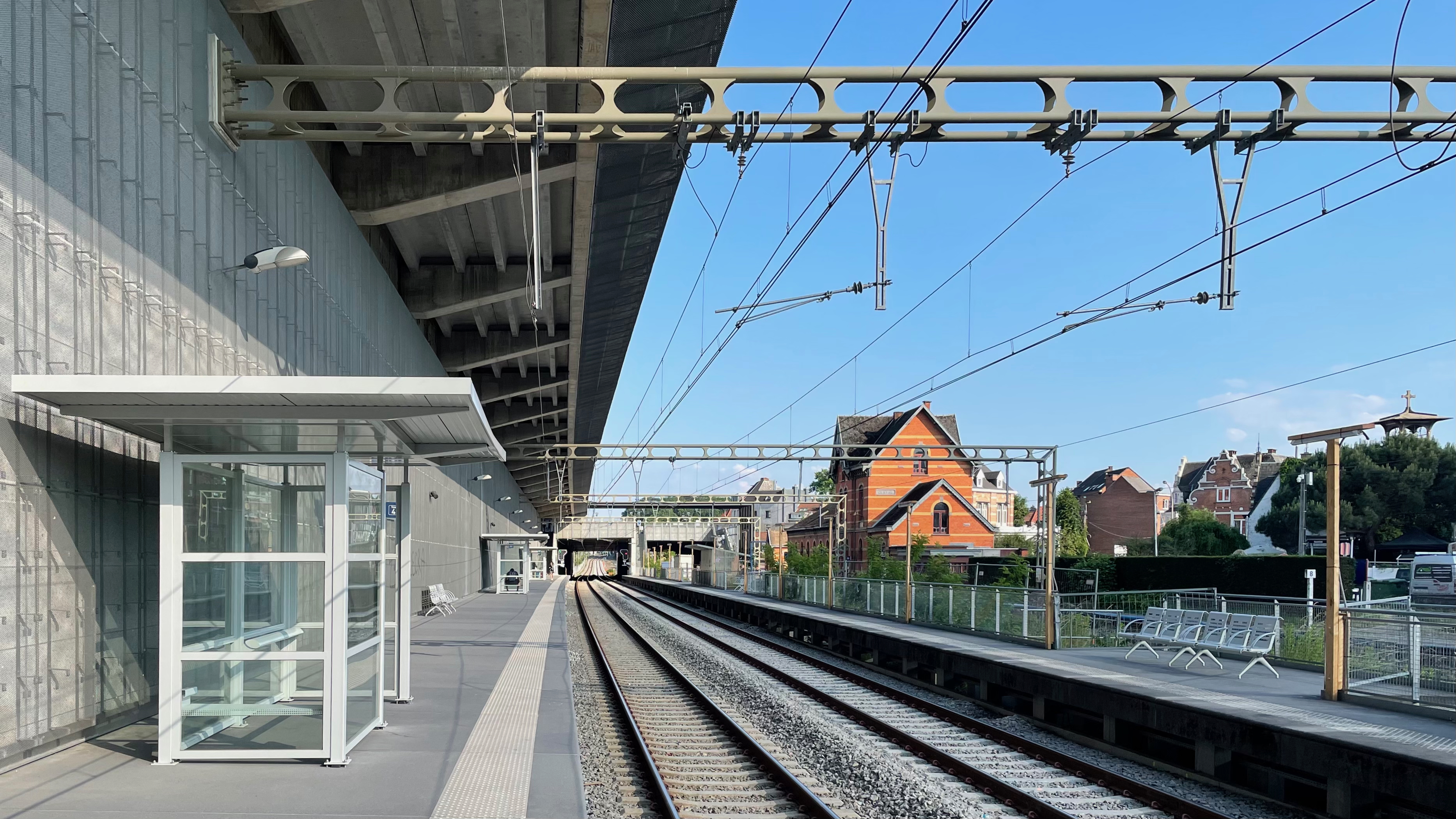
View of the platforms and tracks

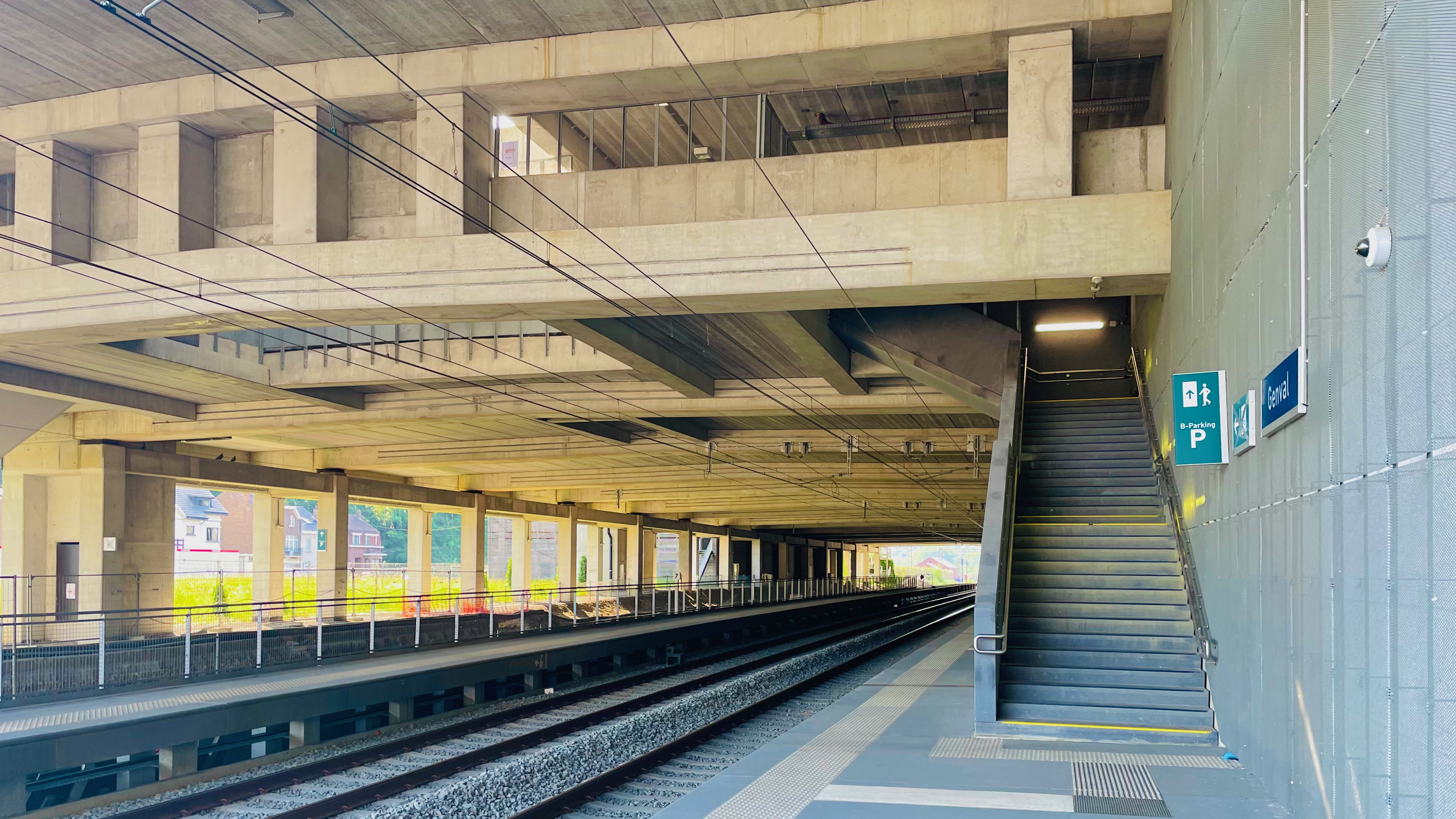
Tracks under the car park

=== Art Nouveau decoration ===
The Art Nouveau decoration of the frontage consists of four beautiful ceramic panels and four sgraffiti, depicting red poppy flowers, plus one sgraffito depicting the "winged wheel", symbol of the railway since the 19th century. This "winged wheel" refers to Hermes, the ancient Greek god of travellers.

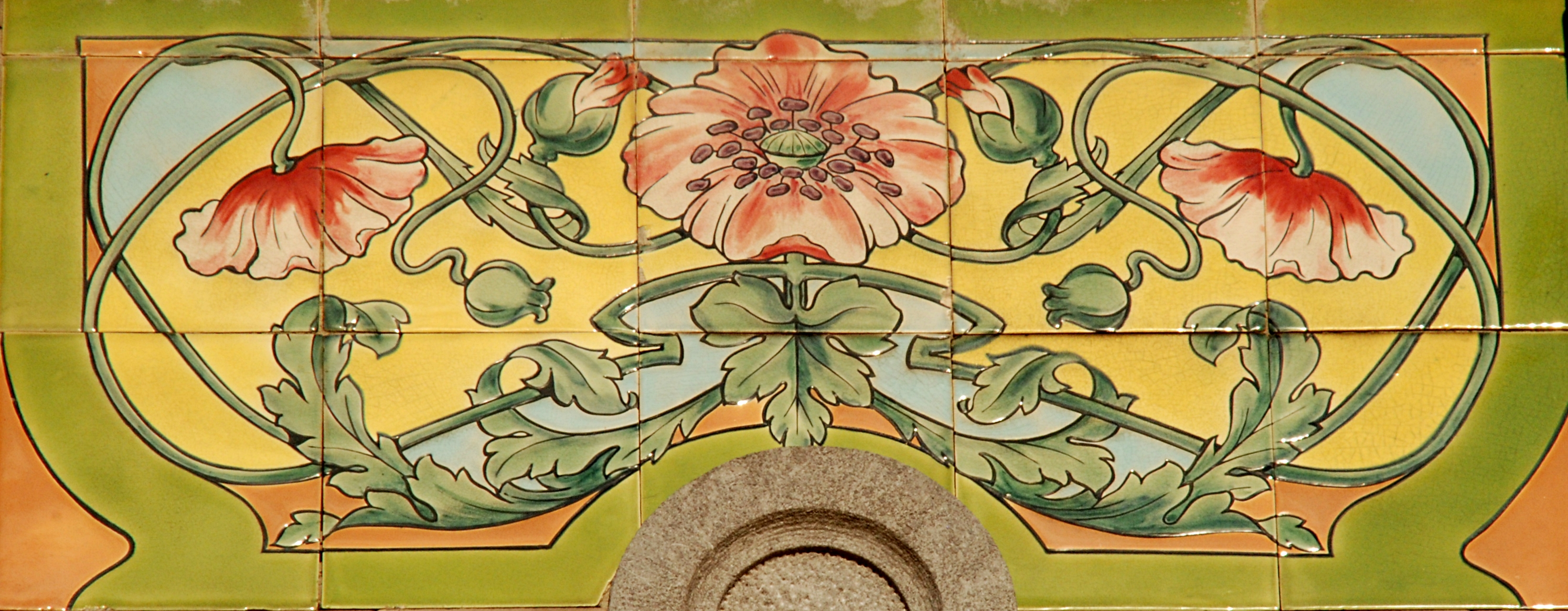
Ceramic panel depicting red poppy flowers

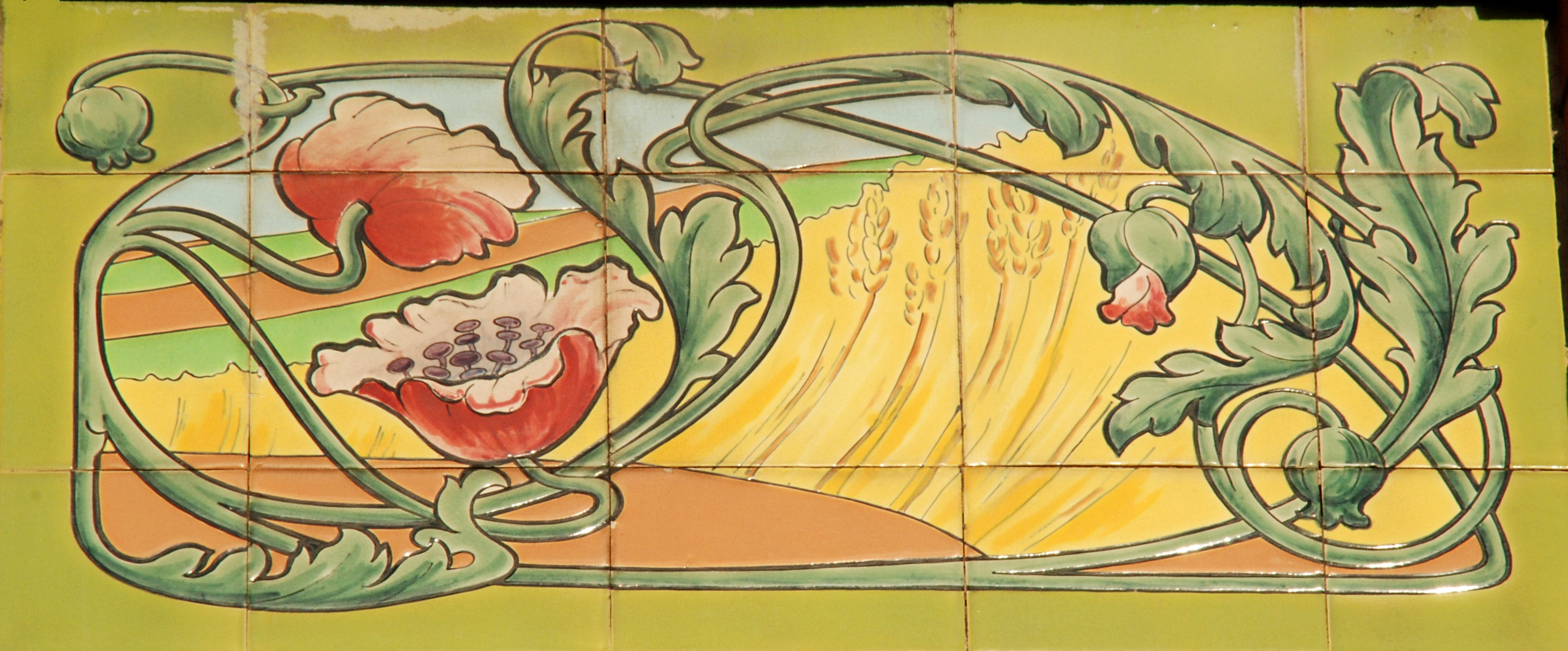
Ceramic panel depicting red poppy flowers

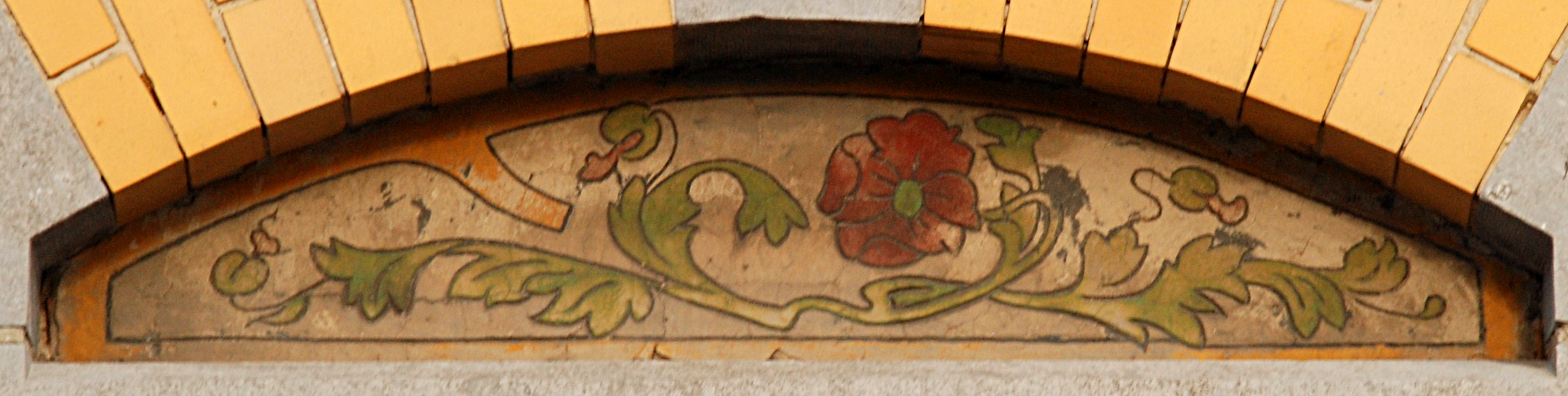
Sgraffito depicting red poppy flowers

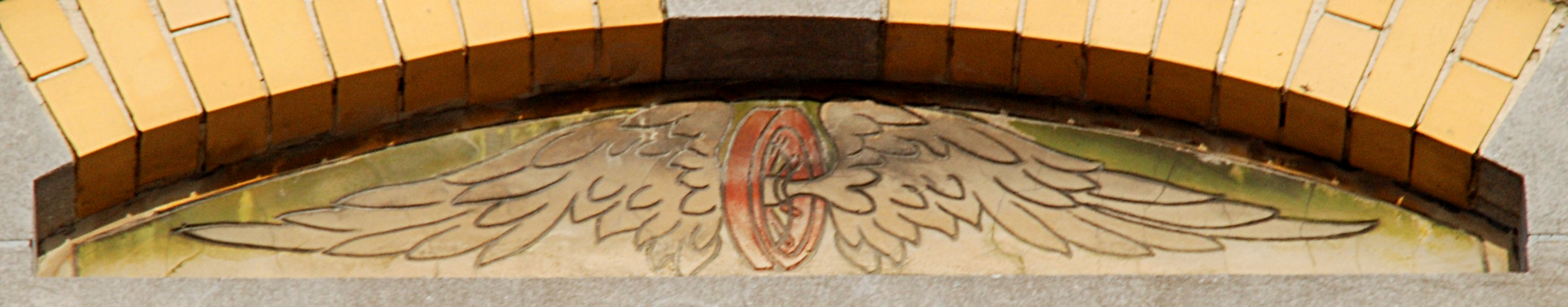
Sgraffito with the "winged wheel"

== Train services ==
The following services currently the serve the station:

- Brussels RER services (S8) Brussels - Etterbeek - Ottignies - Louvain-le-Neuve
- Brussels RER services (S81) Schaarbeek - Brussels-Luxembourg - Etterbeek - Ottignies (weekdays, peak hours only)

Preceding station	NMBS/SNCB	Following station
La Hulpe towards Bruxelles-Midi / Brussel-Zuid	S 8	Rixensart towards Louvain-la-Neuve
La Hulpe towards Schaarbeek	S 81 weekdays	Rixensart towards Ottignies

== Bus services ==
The following service(s) serve the station, operated by TEC.

- 366 (Ixelles - Court-Saint-Etienne)

== See also ==
- List of railway stations in Belgium
- Rail transport in Belgium
