= Misonne =

Misonne is a surname. Notable people with the surname include:

- Jacques Misonne (1892–1968), Belgian equestrian
- Léonard Misonne (1870–1943), Belgian photographer
