= Namur railway station =

Railway station in Namur, Belgium

Namur
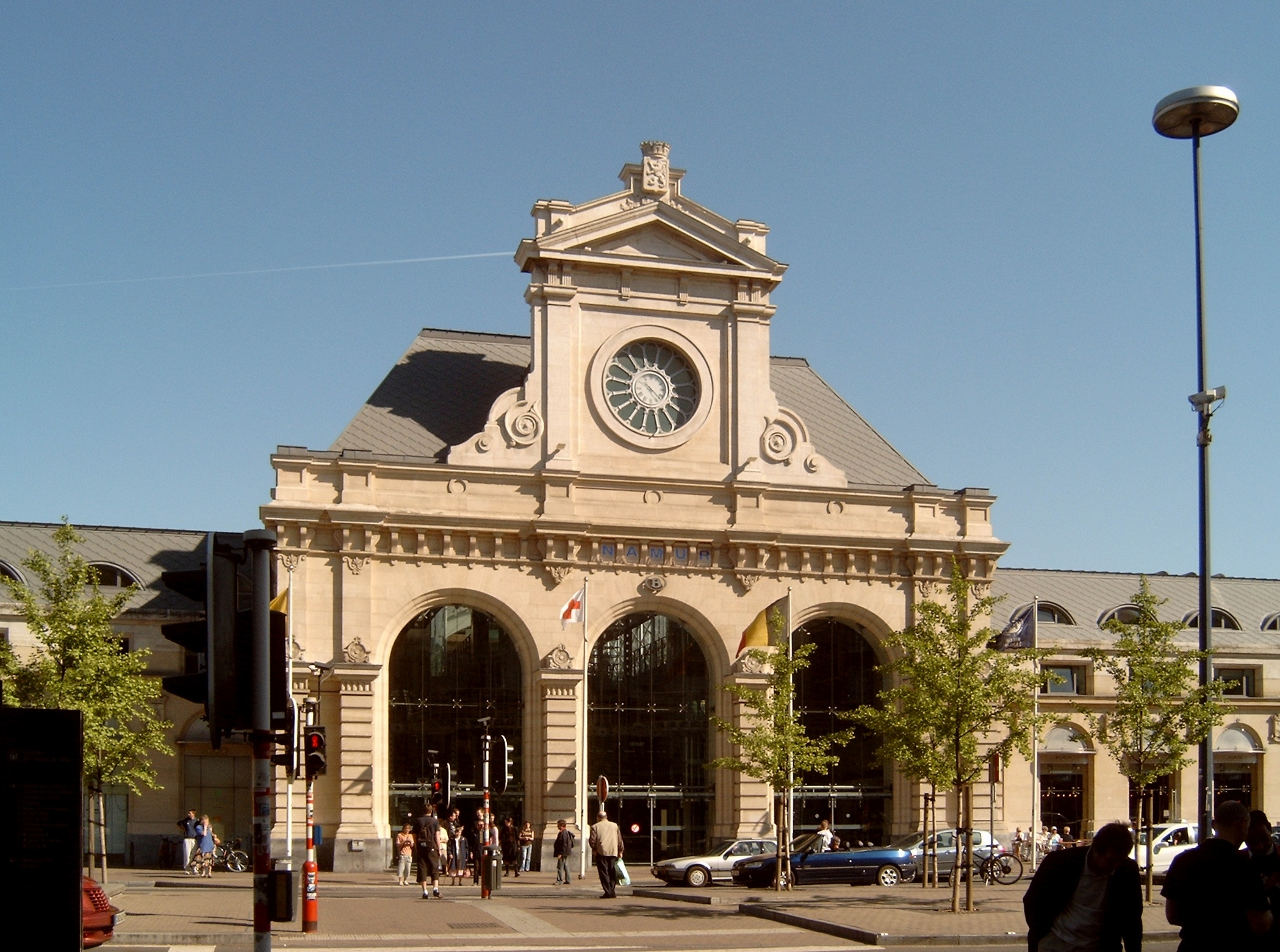
- Namur railway station

General information
- Location: Place de la Station, 5000 Namur; Belgium
- Coordinates: 50.46913°N 4.86247°E
- Elevation: 90 m (300 ft)
- System: Railway Station
- Owner: SNCB/NMBS
- Operator: SNCB/NMBS
- Lines: 125, 130, 154, 161, 162
- Platforms: 6
- Tracks: 11

Other information
- Station code: FNR

History
- Opened: 23 October 1843; 182 years ago

Passengers
- 2009: 7.11 million
Location
- Location within Belgium Location within Europe

Namur railway station (French: Gare de Namur; Dutch: Station Namen) (Note: Officially Namur (French: Namur; Dutch: Namen)) is the main railway station serving Namur, Belgium. The station is used by 18,600 people every day, making it the eighth-busiest station in Belgium and the busiest in Wallonia. It is operated by the National Railway Company of Belgium (SNCB/NMBS).

== History ==
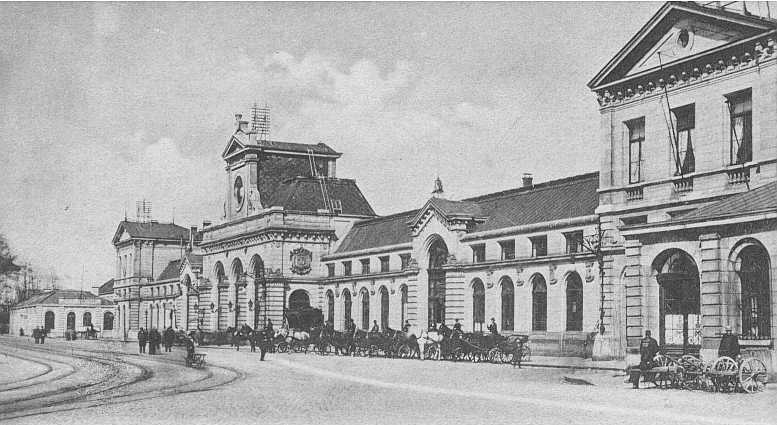
Namur railway station in 1904

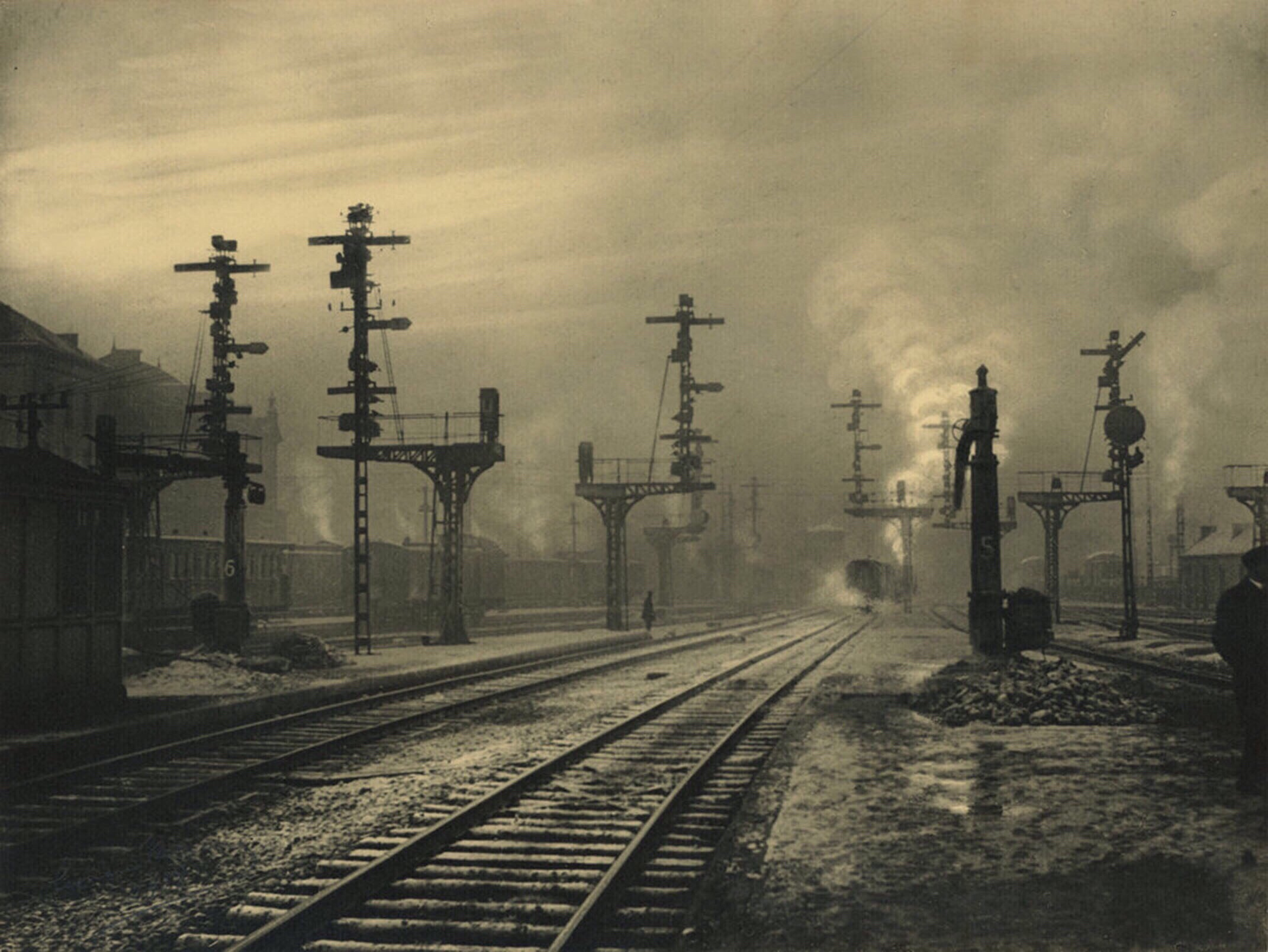
Sortie de la gare, Namur, 1938 photograph by Léonard Misonne

The first railway connection to Namur was inaugurated in 1843, when the Belgian State Railways (Chemins de fer de l'État Belge) opened an indirect line from Brussels to Charleroi (via Braine-le-Comte), continuing to Namur. In 1850, the Compagnie du Nord-Belge inaugurated line 125, connecting Namur to Liège. In 1856, a third company reached Namur (Grande compagnie du Luxembourg) with a direct link to Brussels with line 161. Two years later, the company opened line 162 Namur–Arlon–Luxembourg. In 1862, the Nord-Belge created line 154 Namur–Dinant. The current station building was inaugurated in 1864. In 1869, the Belgian State Railways put into service a sixth line (142) connecting Namur to Tienen; line 142 was completely closed in 1988.

At the end of the 1990s, the passenger building was restored and enlarged by a slab covering the tracks. The station was served by a daily Thalys high-speed rail service to Paris between 1998 and 31 March 2015. With the commissioning of the Schuman-Josaphat tunnel in Brussels on 3 April 2016, Namur obtained a direct link with Brussels Airport.

== Train services ==
The station is served by the following services:

- Intercity services (IC-16) Brussels – Namur – Arlon – Luxembourg
- Intercity services (IC-17) Brussels Airport – Brussels-Luxembourg – Namur – Dinant (weekdays)
- Intercity services (IC-17) Brussels – Namur – Dinant (weekends)
- Intercity services (IC-18) Brussels – Namur – Liege (weekdays)
- Intercity services (IC-19) Lille – Tournai – Saint-Ghislain – Mons – Charleroi – Namur
- Intercity services (IC-25) Mons – Charleroi – Namur – Huy – Liege (weekdays)
- Intercity services (IC-25) Mouscron – Tournai – Saint-Ghislain – Mons – Charleroi – Namur – Huy – Liege – Liers (weekends)
- Intercity services (K82) Maubeuge – Charleroi – Namur
- Local services (L-01) Namur – Huy – Liège
- Local services (L-08) Ottignies – Gembloux – Namur
- Local services (L-11) Namur – Dinant – Bertrix – Libramont
- Local services (L-14) Ottignies – Fleurus – Charleroi – Tamines – Namur – Jambes
- Local services (L-16) Namur – Assesse (- Ciney)

Preceding station	NMBS/SNCB	Following station
Gembloux towards Bruxelles-Midi / Brussel-Zuid	IC 16	Ciney towards Luxembourg
Gembloux towards Brussels National Airport	IC 17 weekdays	Jambes towards Dinant
Gembloux towards Bruxelles-Midi / Brussel-Zuid	IC 17 weekends	Jambes towards Dinant
Gembloux towards Bruxelles-Midi / Brussel-Zuid	IC 18 weekdays	Andenne towards Liège-Saint-Lambert
Tamines towards Lille-Flandres	IC 19	Terminus
Jemeppe-sur-Sambre towards Mons	IC 25 weekdays, except holidays	Andenne towards Herstal
Jemeppe-sur-Sambre towards Mouscron	IC 25 weekends	Andenne towards Liers
Terminus	L 01	Marche-les-Dames towards Liège-Guillemins
Rhisnes towards Ottignies	L 08	Terminus
Terminus	L 11	Jambes towards Libramont
Ronet towards Ottignies	L 14 weekdays, except holidays	Jambes Terminus
Ronet towards Ottignies	L 14 weekends	Terminus
Terminus	L 16 weekdays, except holidays	Jambes-Est towards Assesse
Terminus	L 16 weekends	Jambes-Est towards Ciney
Preceding station	TER Hauts-de-France	Following station
Charleroi-South towards Maubeuge	Krono K82	Terminus

In addition to the above services, additional peak time trains are scheduled on weekdays (mornings and end of afternoons).

== Gallery ==
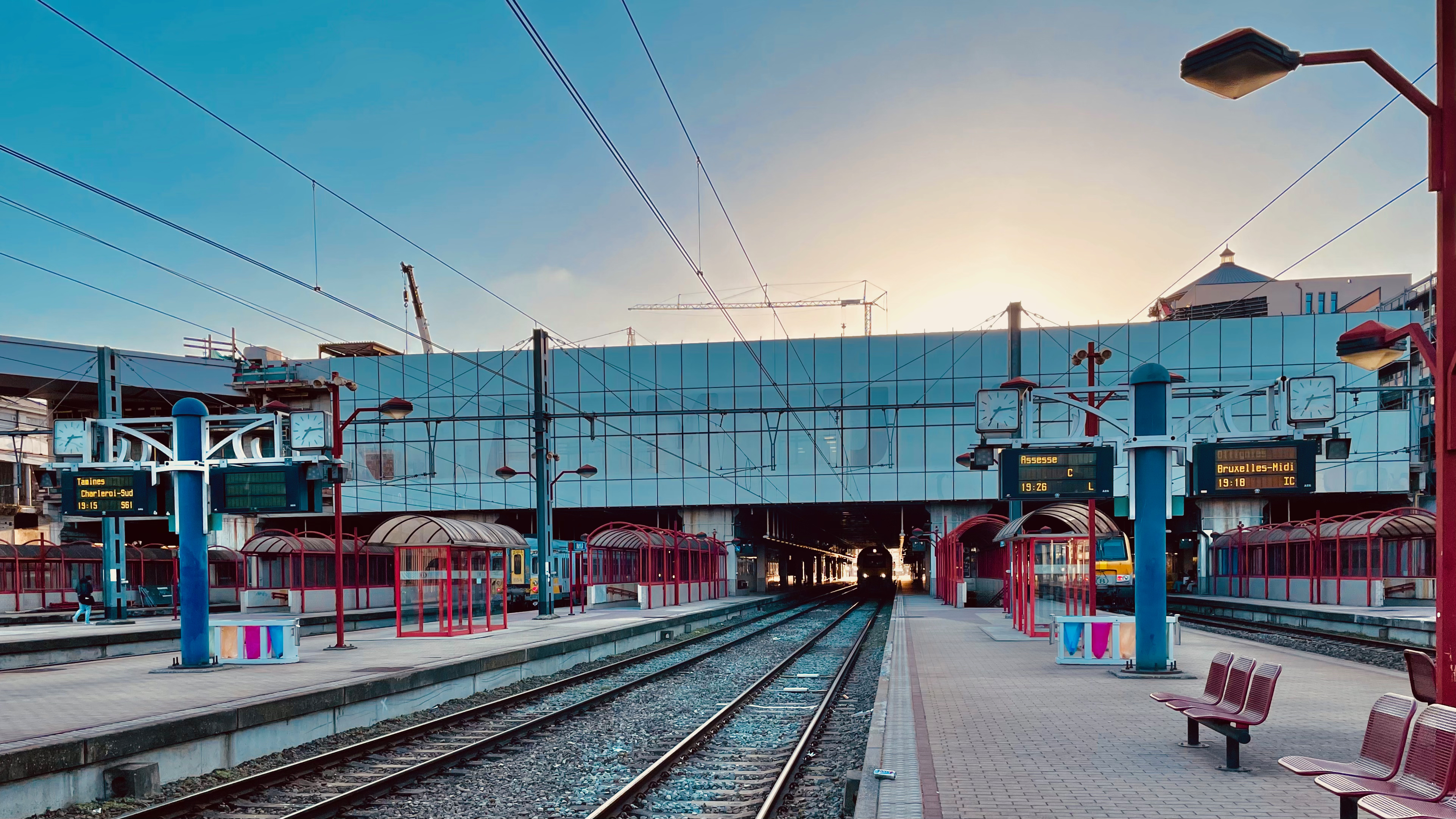
View of the platforms and tracks

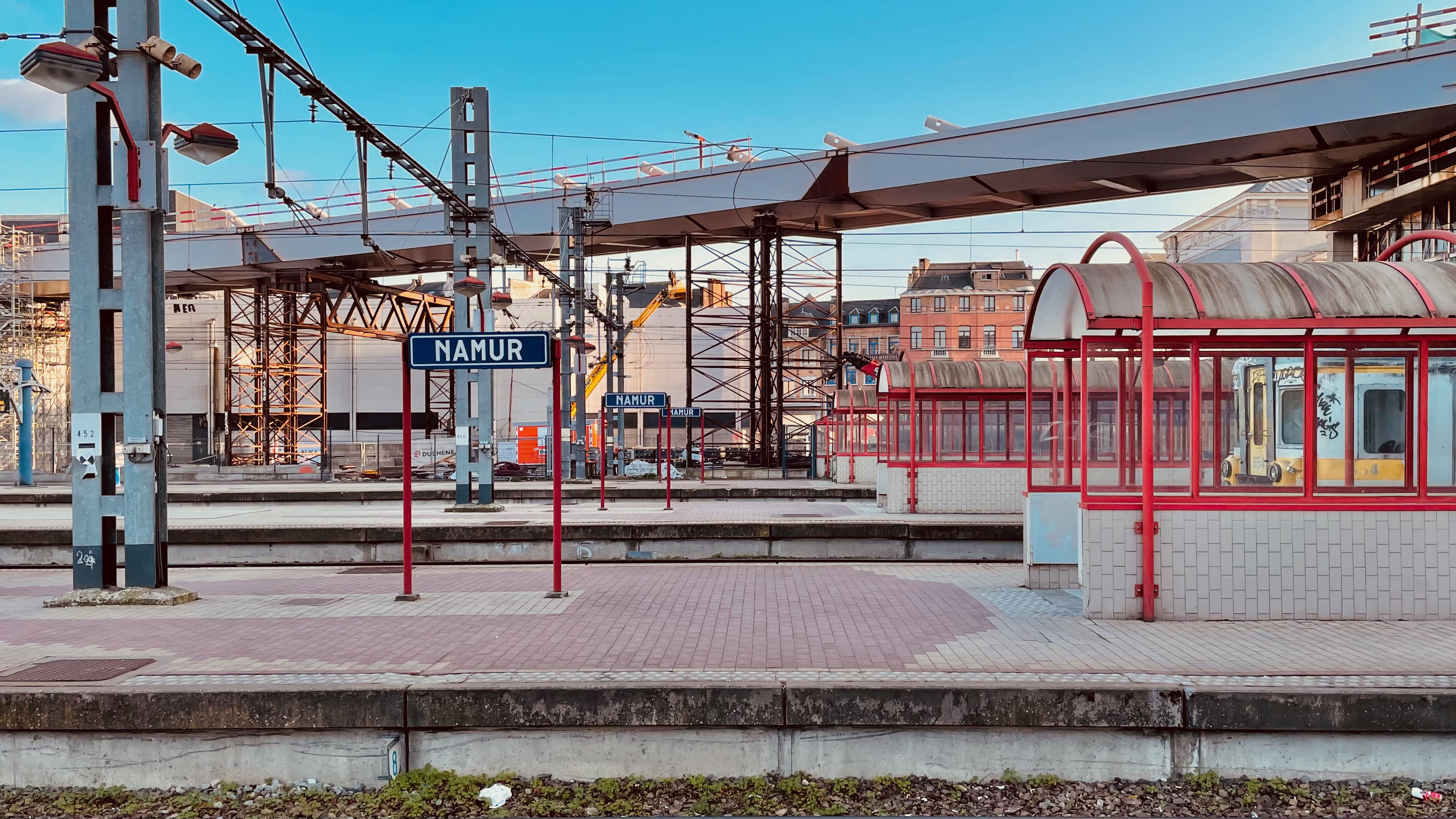
Place name sign on a platform

== See also ==
- List of railway stations in Belgium
- Rail transport in Belgium
- Site of the Walloon regional archives. Namur station and future headquarters of the Ministry of Equipment and Works (MET). Progress of the works. Pictures from 1997
