= Belgian railway line 161 =

Railway line between Brussels and Namur, Belgium

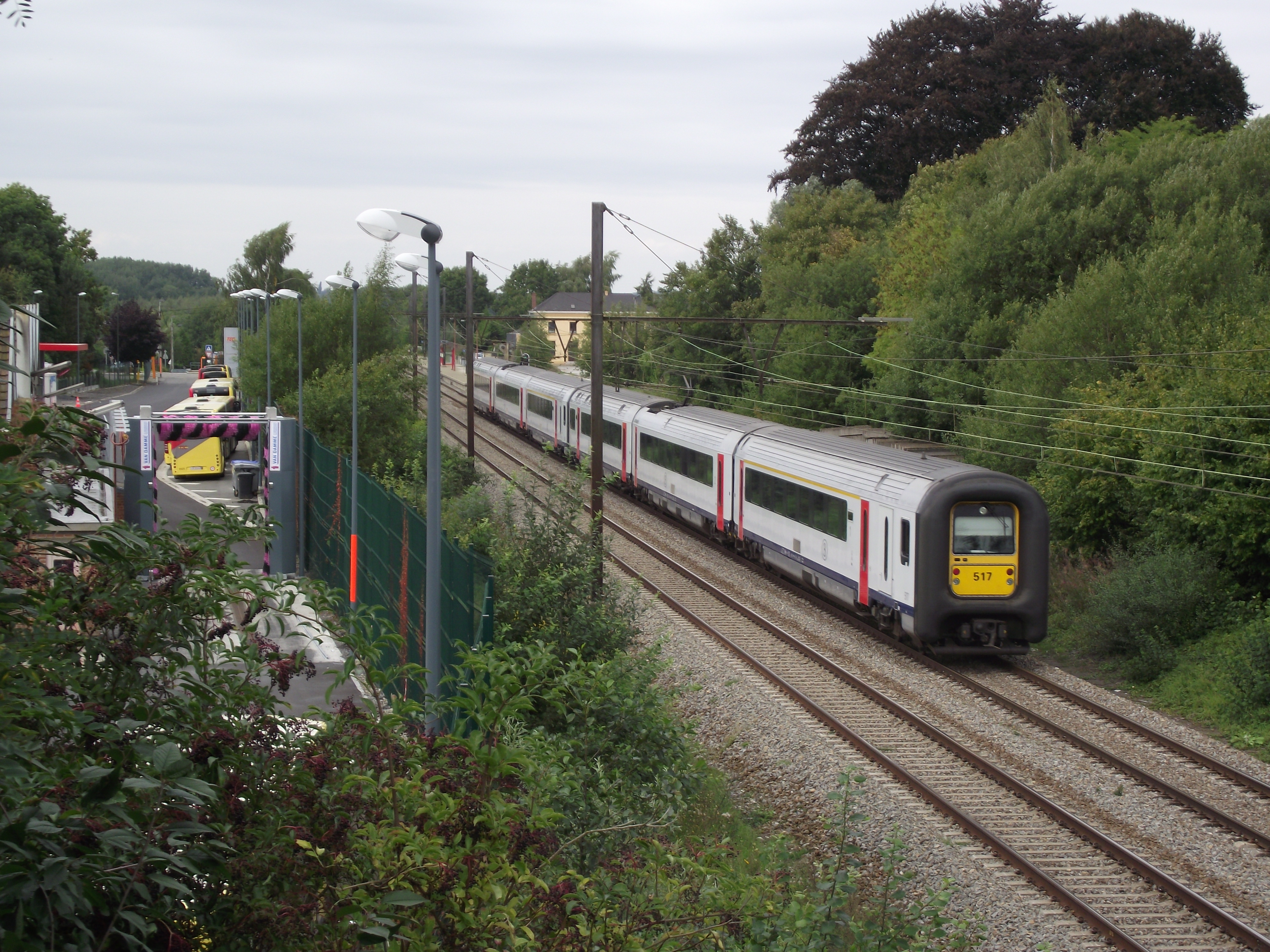
- A passenger train on line 161 in 2010

Overview
- Status: Operational
- Locale: Belgium
- Termini: Brussels-North railway station; Namur railway station

Service
- Operator(s): National Railway Company of Belgium

History
- Opened: 1854-1856

Technical
- Line length: 62 km (39 mi)
- Number of tracks: double track
- Track gauge: 1,435 mm (4 ft 8 1/2 in) standard gauge
- Electrification: 3 kV DC
Route map
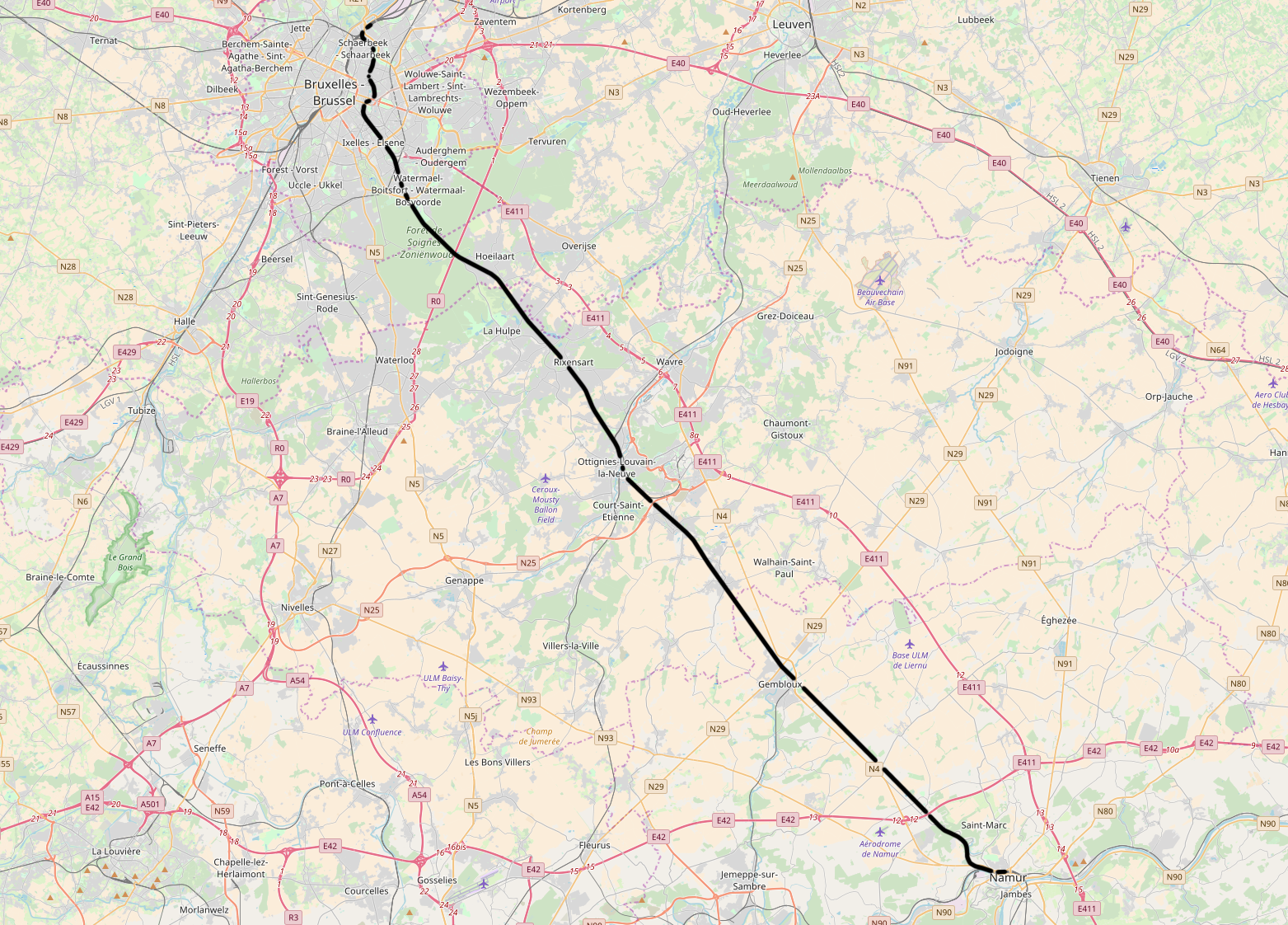

The Belgian railway line 161 is the railway line in Belgium connecting Brussels to Namur. The line first opened on 12 August 1854 between Brussels-Luxembourg and La Hulpe railway stations, and was completed on 23 October 1856.

The line goes through the following stations:

- Brussels-North
- Brussels-Schuman
- Brussels-Luxembourg
- Etterbeek
- Watermael
- Boitsfort
- Groenendaal
- Hoeilaart
- La Hulpe
- Genval
- Rixensart
- Profondsart
- Ottignies
- Mont-Saint-Guibert
- Blanmont
- Chastre
- Ernage
- Gembloux
- Lonzée
- Beuzet
- Saint-Denis-Bovesse
- Rhisnes
- Namur
