= Léonard Misonne =

Belgian photographer

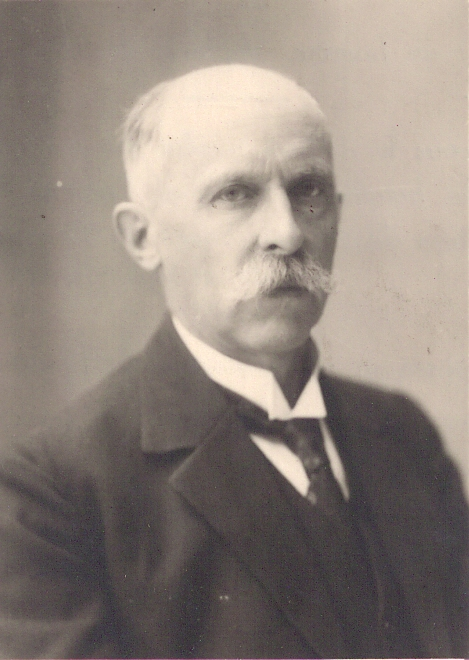
- Born: 1 July 1870; Gilly, Belgium
- Died: 14 September 1943 (aged 73); Gilly, Belgium
- Known for: Photography
- Movement: Pictorialism
- Spouse: Valentine Lambin (m. 1906)

Léonard Misonne (French: [leɔnaʁ mizɔn]; 1 July 1870 – 14 September 1943) was a Belgian pictorialist photographer. He is known for his landscapes and street scenes with atmospheric skies.

== Early life ==
Born to a wealthy family in Gilly, Belgium in 1870, Léonard Misonne was one of many children of Adèle Pirmez and lawyer and industrialist Louis Misonne. He studied Greek and humanities in Charleroi before going to the Université catholique de Louvain where he got a degree in mining engineering. However, he did not become a mining engineer in the long term. (Note: Sources differ on whether he actually worked as a mining engineer at all)

== Photography ==
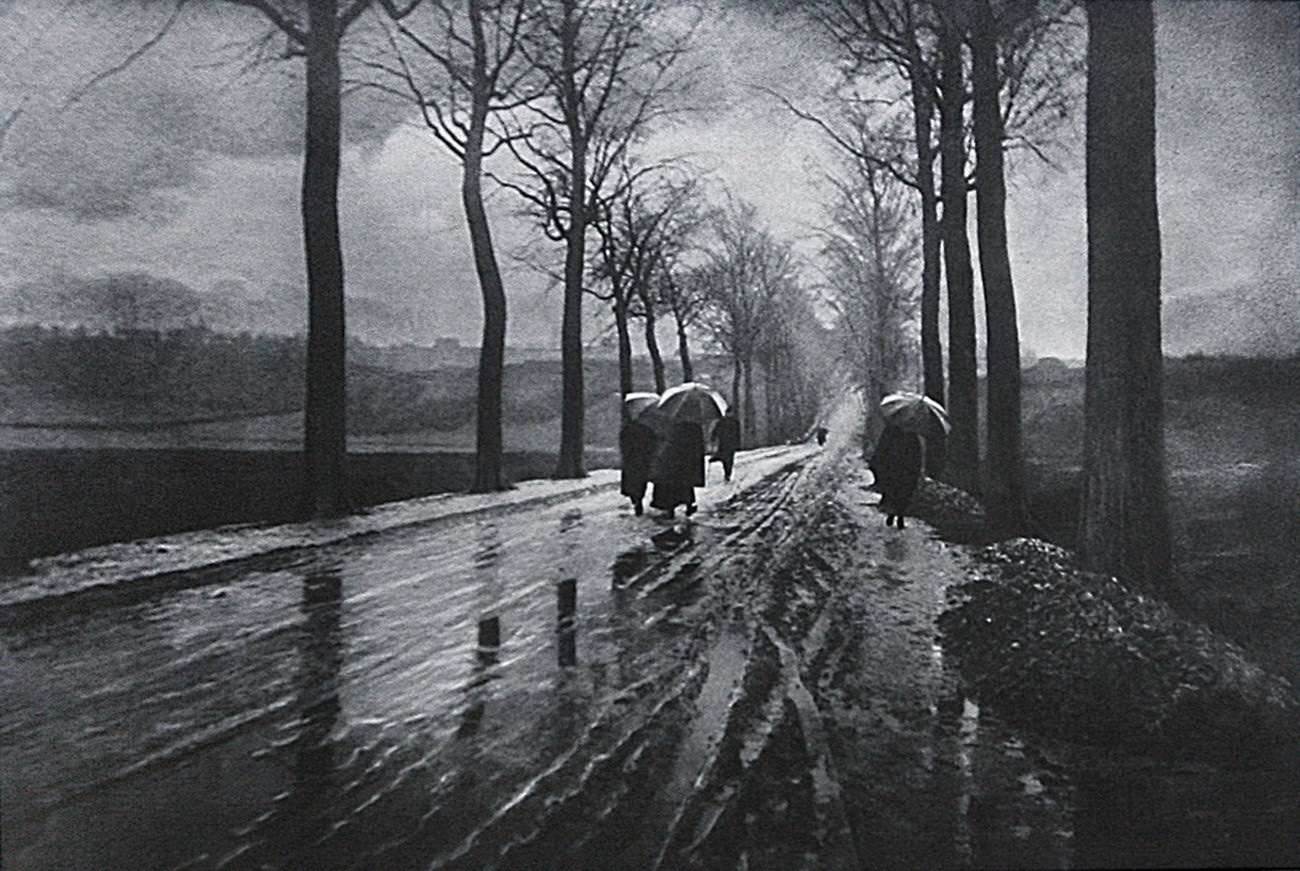
Returning from the market, 1910s

Misonne is best known for his atmospheric photographs of landscapes and street scenes, with light as a key feature, and as a pioneer of pictorialism. According to the Directory of Belgian Photographers, "Misonne’s work is characterised by a masterly treatment of light and atmospheric conditions. His images express poetic qualities, but sometimes slip into an anecdotal sentimentality." He was nicknamed "the Corot of photography".

Misonne devoted himself to photography from 1896, joining the Belgian Photography Association in 1897. He became a leading light in pictorialism, frequently exhibiting his photographs at exhibitions. He also did slide shows. Much of his photography was in Belgium and the Netherlands, but he also visited London, France, Germany and Switzerland. The German occupation of Belgium during World War II greatly restricted his photography.

=== Techniques ===
Misonne would often photograph things that were strongly illuminated from behind, producing a halo effect. He would also retouch the lighting effects in his photographs, experimenting with and using many techniques, such as the Fresson process and later the bromoil and mediobrome processes. He also invented the "flou-net" and "photo-dessin" processes.

=== Quotes ===
The subject is nothing, light is everything

The sky is the key to the landscape

== Personal life ==
Misonne married Louise Valentine Lambin in 1906, and they had several children. (Note: Some sources spell his wife's name as Labin, but this article assumes that the spelling in the genealogy site is correct) He supported himself with the family fortune.

Misonne was a keen cyclist, winning some races.

Misonne suffered severely from asthma throughout his life, and died in Gilly in 1943.

== Bibliography ==
- Tableaux photographiques, by Léonard Misonne, 1927

== Gallery ==
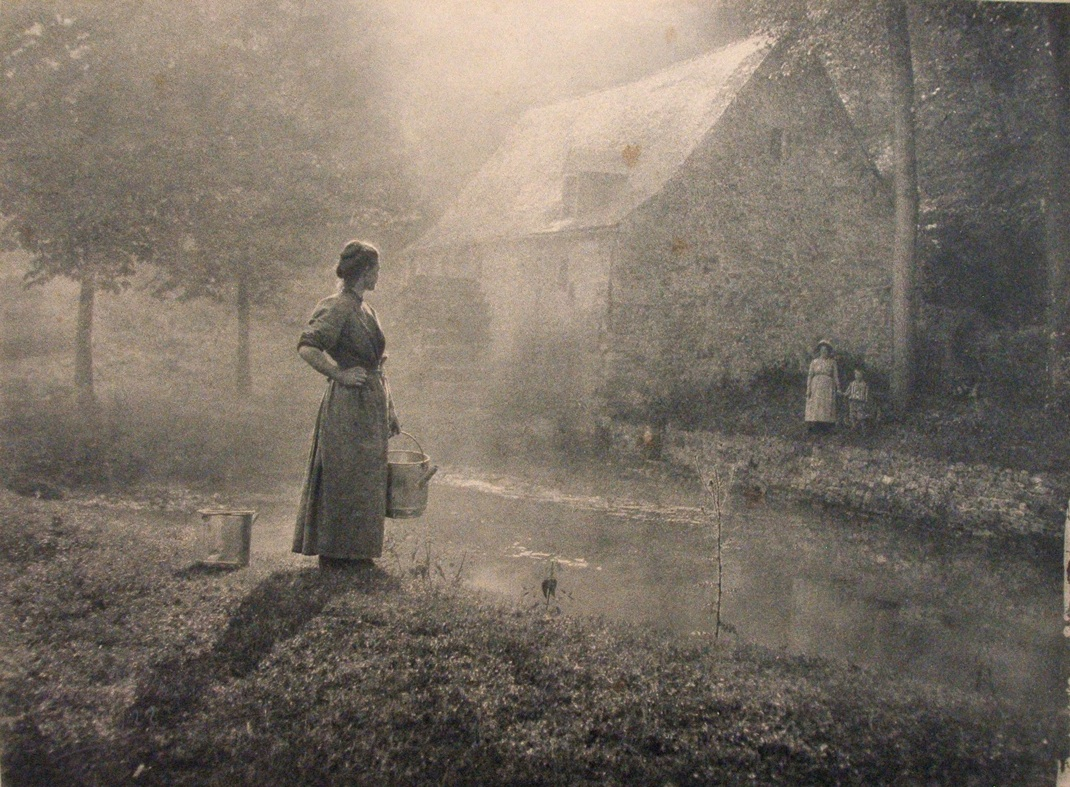
By the mill, 1910s

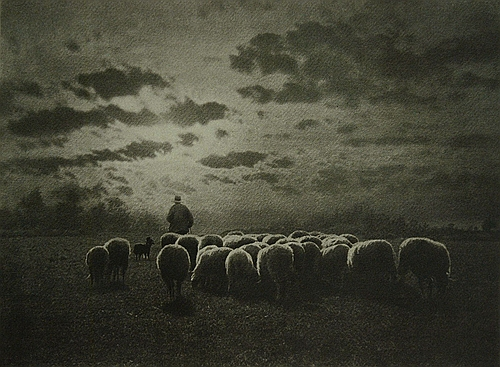
At sunset

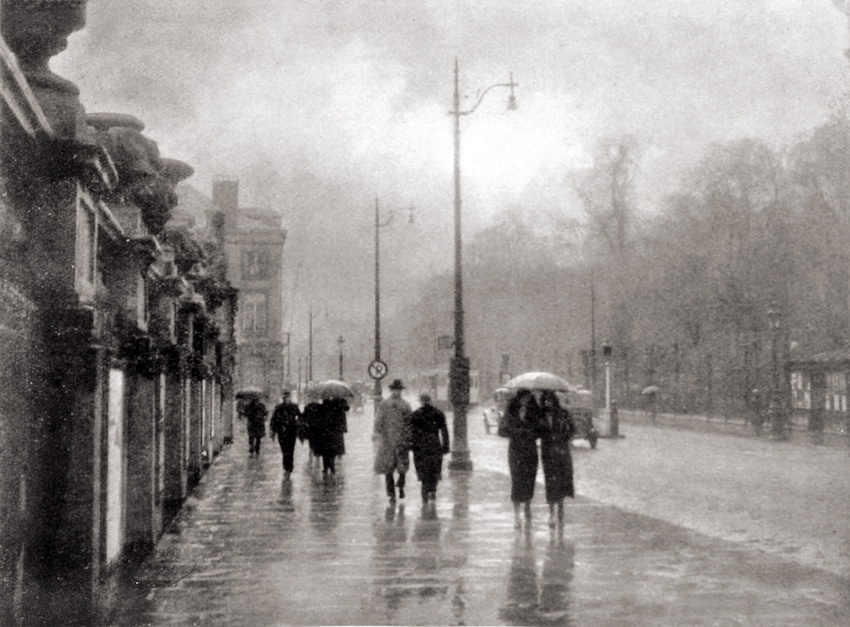
Rainy day, 1930s

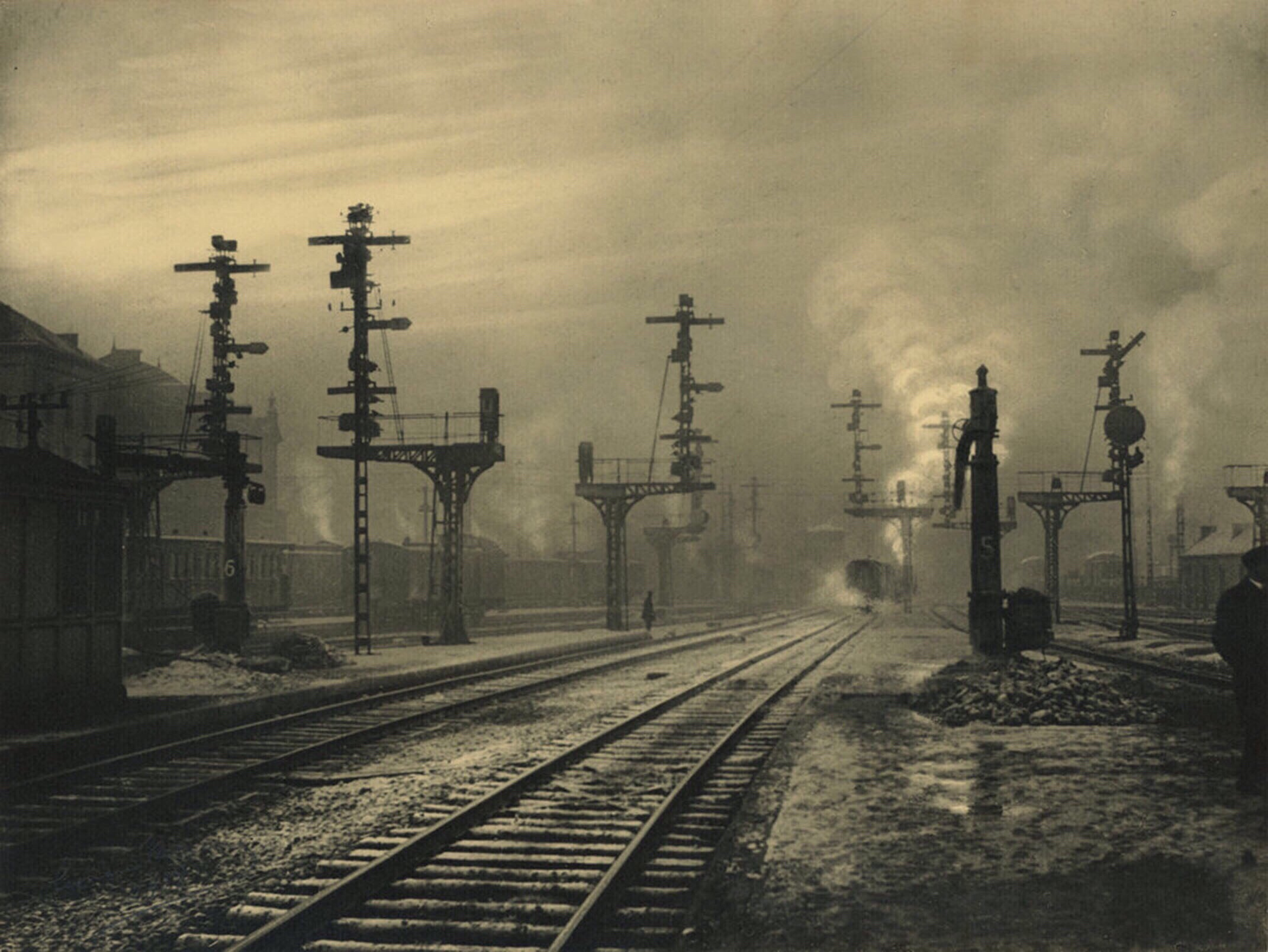
Exit from Namur station

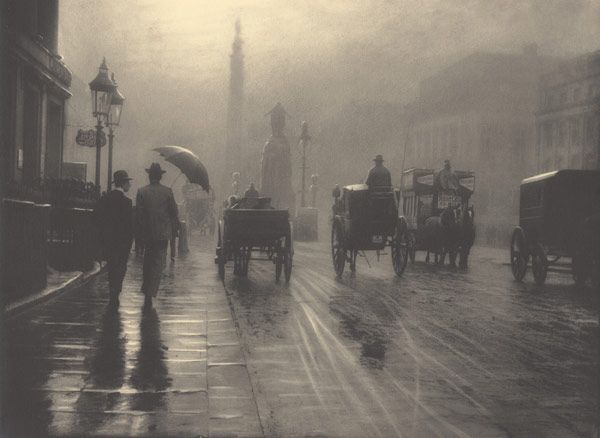
Waterloo Place, London, 1899

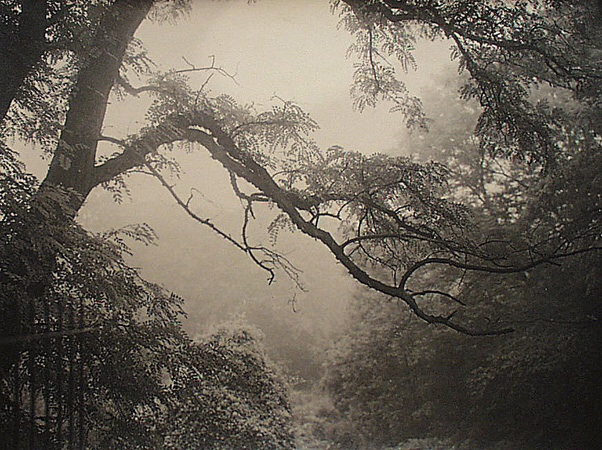
Tree in the mist, 1910s

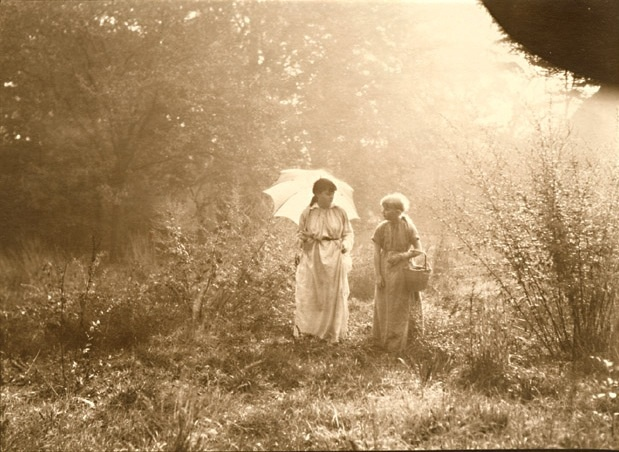
Strolling with a parasol, 1910s

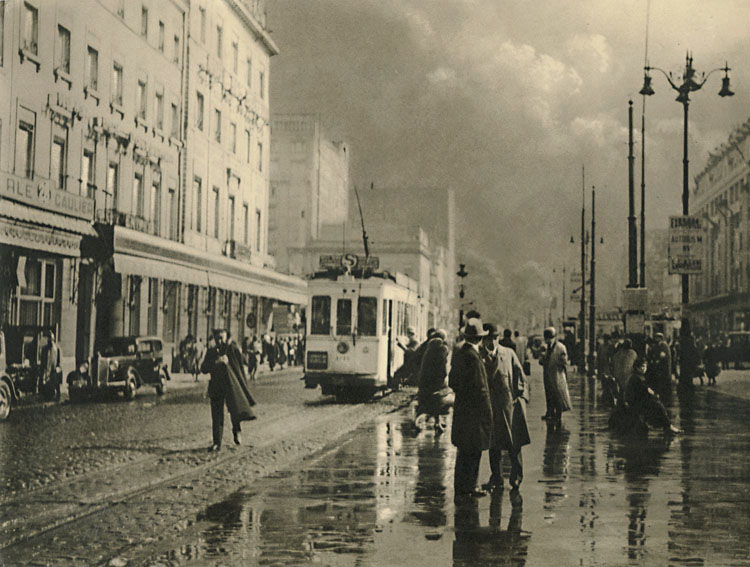
Rainy street with tram in Brussels, 1937
