= Ottignies railway station =

Railway station in Walloon Brabant, Belgium

Ottignies
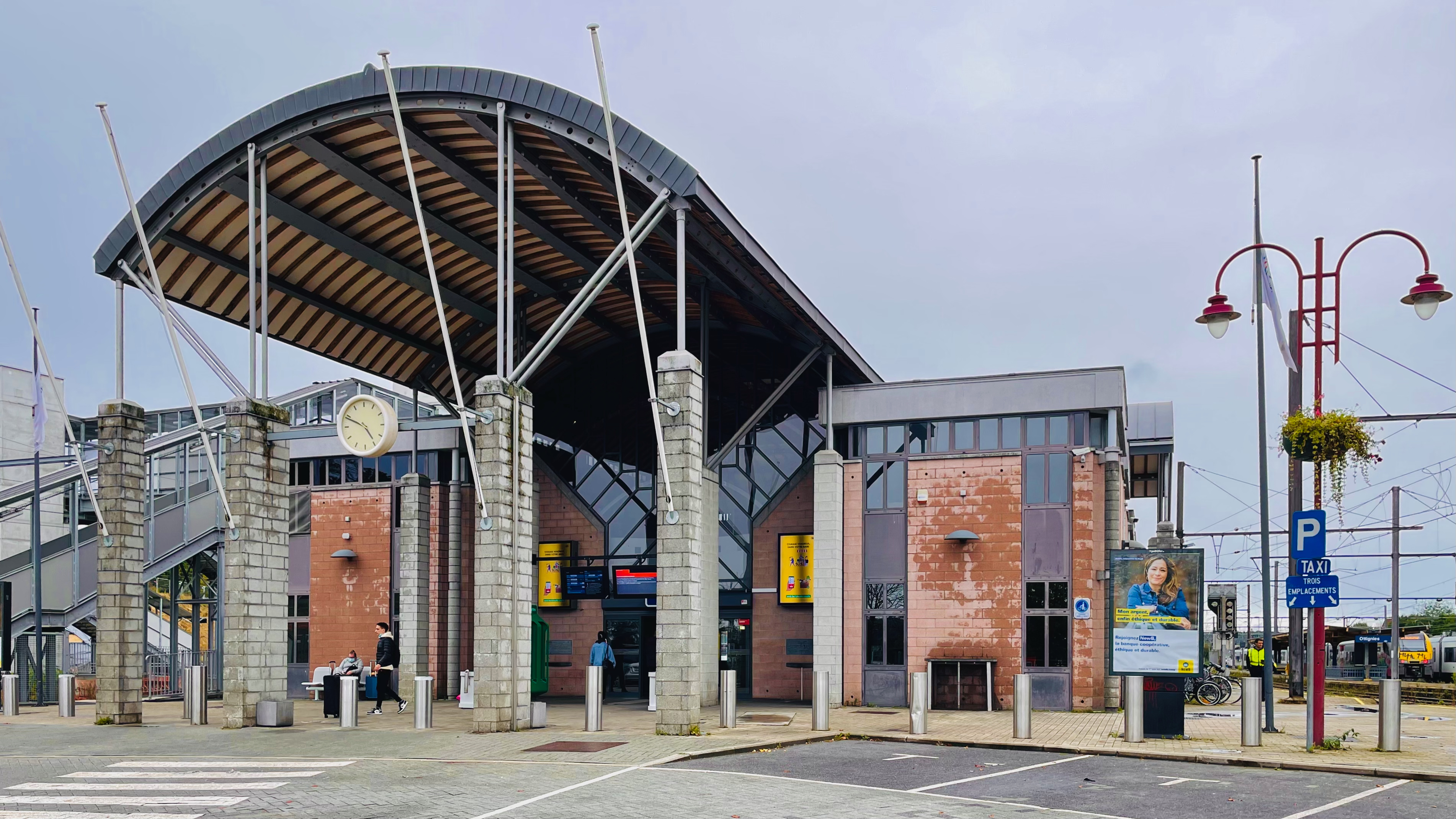
- Ottignies railway station

General information
- Location: Ottignies, Walloon Brabant; Belgium
- Coordinates: 50°40′27″N 4°34′08″E
- System: Railway Station
- Owner: SNCB/NMBS
- Operator: SNCB/NMBS
- Lines: 139, 140, 161
- Platforms: 5
- Tracks: 10

Other information
- Station code: LT

History
- Opened: 14 June 1855; 171 years ago
Location
- Location within Belgium Location within Europe

Ottignies railway station (French: Gare d'Ottignies; Dutch: Station Ottignies) (Note: Officially Ottignies) is a railway station in Ottignies-Louvain-la-Neuve, Walloon Brabant, Belgium.

The station was opened in 1855 by the Grande Compagnie de Luxembourg, and from 1884, had a station building designed by the architect Charles Licot. This building was destroyed in 1996 and replaced by a new, modern and functional building inaugurated in 1999. In 2024, it was the third busiest station in Wallonia after Liège-Guillemins and Namur (serving a similar number of passengers), and the ninth-busiest in Belgium.

Ottignies is an important station on the National Railway Company of Belgium (SNCB/NMBS) network. It is served by InterCity (IC), suburban (S), local (L), rush hour (P) and touristic (ICT) trains. The station is a keilbahnhof: it lies along railway line 161 (Brussels to Namur) and at the ends of railway lines 139 (Leuven to Ottignies) and 140 (Ottignies to Marcinelle). South of Ottignies, stroke line 161D goes to Louvain-la-Neuve.

== History ==
=== The 1855 station ===
The first station in Ottignies was opened on 14 June 1855 by the Grande Compagnie de Luxembourg, a few days after the opening of the section of track between La Hulpe and Gembloux of its railway from Brussels to Luxembourg. From August 1855, it became an important railway hub with the opening of the line from Charleroi to Leuven.

=== The 1884 station ===
In 1884, the temporary structures were replaced by a neoclassical building designed by the architect Charles Licot. Over the years, Licot's building was extensively modified.

=== The 1999 station ===
A project for a new station was considered in the 1980s. It was approved in 1991, with plans to demolish the existing station building and build a new one. Construction started in 1996 and the station opened in 1999. It is a postmodern concrete bicolour cross-shaped building with large windows.

== Location ==
Lying at an altitude of 67 metres, Ottignies is a junction-point located at the kilometric point (PK) 28.484 of the railway line 161 (Brussels to Namur) between the stations of Profondsart and Mont-Saint-Guibert; at the PK 0.000 of the railway line 140 (Ottignies to Marcinelle), the next station on that line being Céroux-Mousty, and at the PK 28.935 of the railway line 139 (Leuven to Ottignies), the previous station being Limal.

Arranged in an X shape, Ottignies railway station has the particularity of having its passenger building located in the centre of the tracks. The first five tracks, used by trains operating on line 161 (and 161D) are located on the western side of the building. Tracks 6 and 8, generally used by trains operating on line 139, come to a dead-end right behind the station building. Track 7 is a siding. Tracks 9, 10 and 11 are located on the eastern side of the building and are used by the trains operating on line 140. Track 11 can only be used by trains operating on line 139 or 140. The tracks are numbered from the west.

== Train services ==
The station is served by the following services:

- Intercity services (IC-16) Brussels - Namur - Arlon - Luxembourg
- Intercity services (IC-17) Brussels Airport - Brussels-Luxembourg - Namur - Dinant (weekdays)
- Intercity services (IC-17) Brussels - Namur - Dinant (weekends)
- Intercity services (IC-18) Brussels - Namur - Liège (weekdays)
- Local services (L-08) Ottignies - Gembloux - Namur
- Local services (L-14) Ottignies - Fleurus - Charleroi - Tamines - Namur - Jambes
- Brussels RER services (S8) Brussels - Etterbeek - Ottignies - Louvain-la-Neuve
- Brussels RER services (S20) Leuven - Wavre - Ottignies
- Brussels RER services (S81) Schaarbeek - Brussels-Luxembourg - Etterbeek - Ottignies (weekdays, peak hours only)

Preceding station	NMBS/SNCB	Following station
Brussels-Luxembourg towards Bruxelles-Midi / Brussel-Zuid	IC 16	Gembloux towards Luxembourg
Etterbeek towards Brussels National Airport	IC 17 weekdays	Gembloux towards Dinant
Etterbeek towards Bruxelles-Midi / Brussel-Zuid	IC 17 weekends	Gembloux towards Dinant
Etterbeek towards Bruxelles-Midi / Brussel-Zuid	IC 18 weekdays	Gembloux towards Liège-Saint-Lambert
Terminus	L 08	Mont-Saint-Guibert towards Namur
Terminus	L 08	Céroux-Mousty towards Namur
Profondsart towards Bruxelles-Midi / Brussel-Zuid	S 8	Louvain-la-Neuve Terminus
Limal towards Leuven	S 20	Terminus
Profondsart towards Schaarbeek	S 81 weekdays	Terminus

== Gallery ==
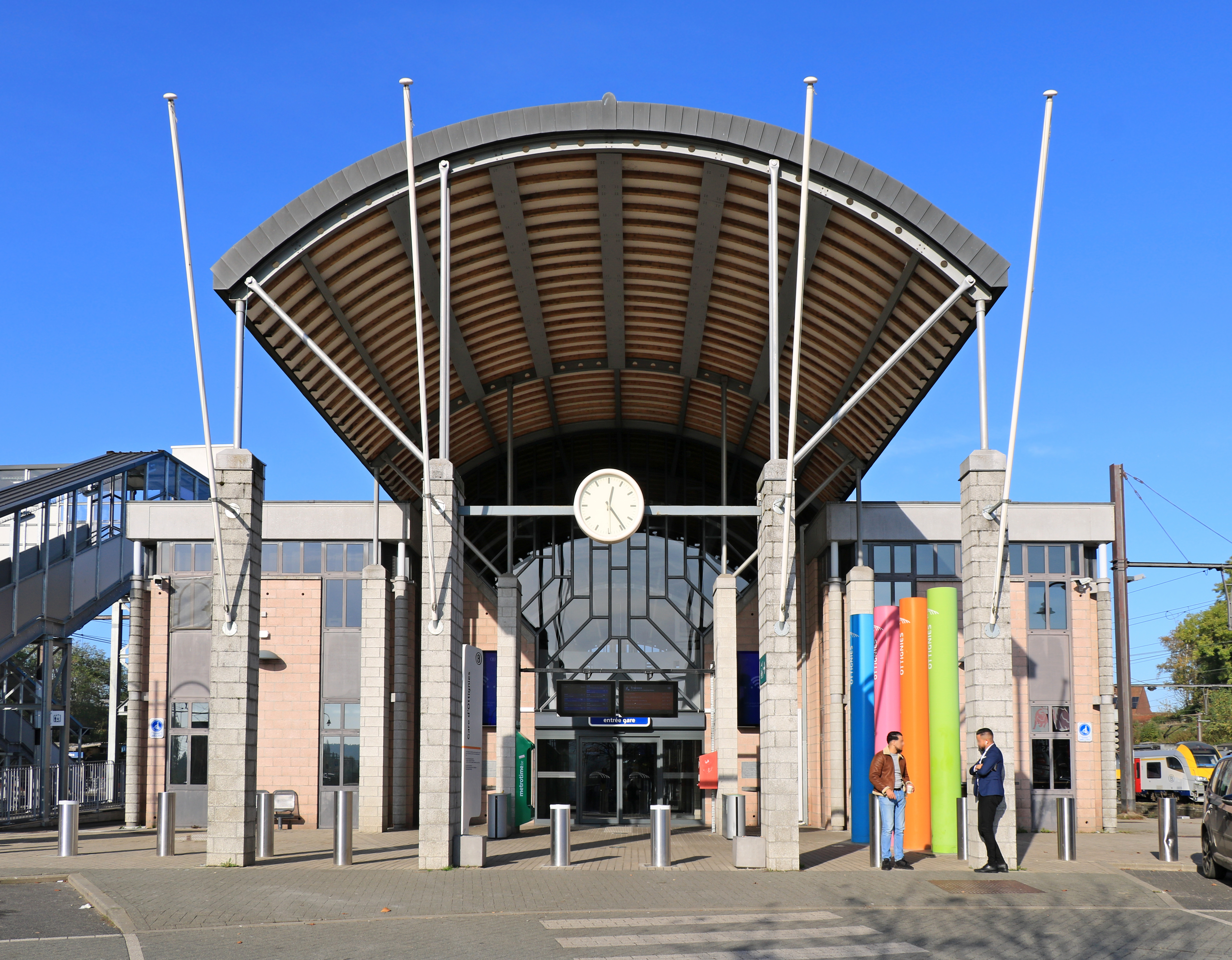
Frontal view

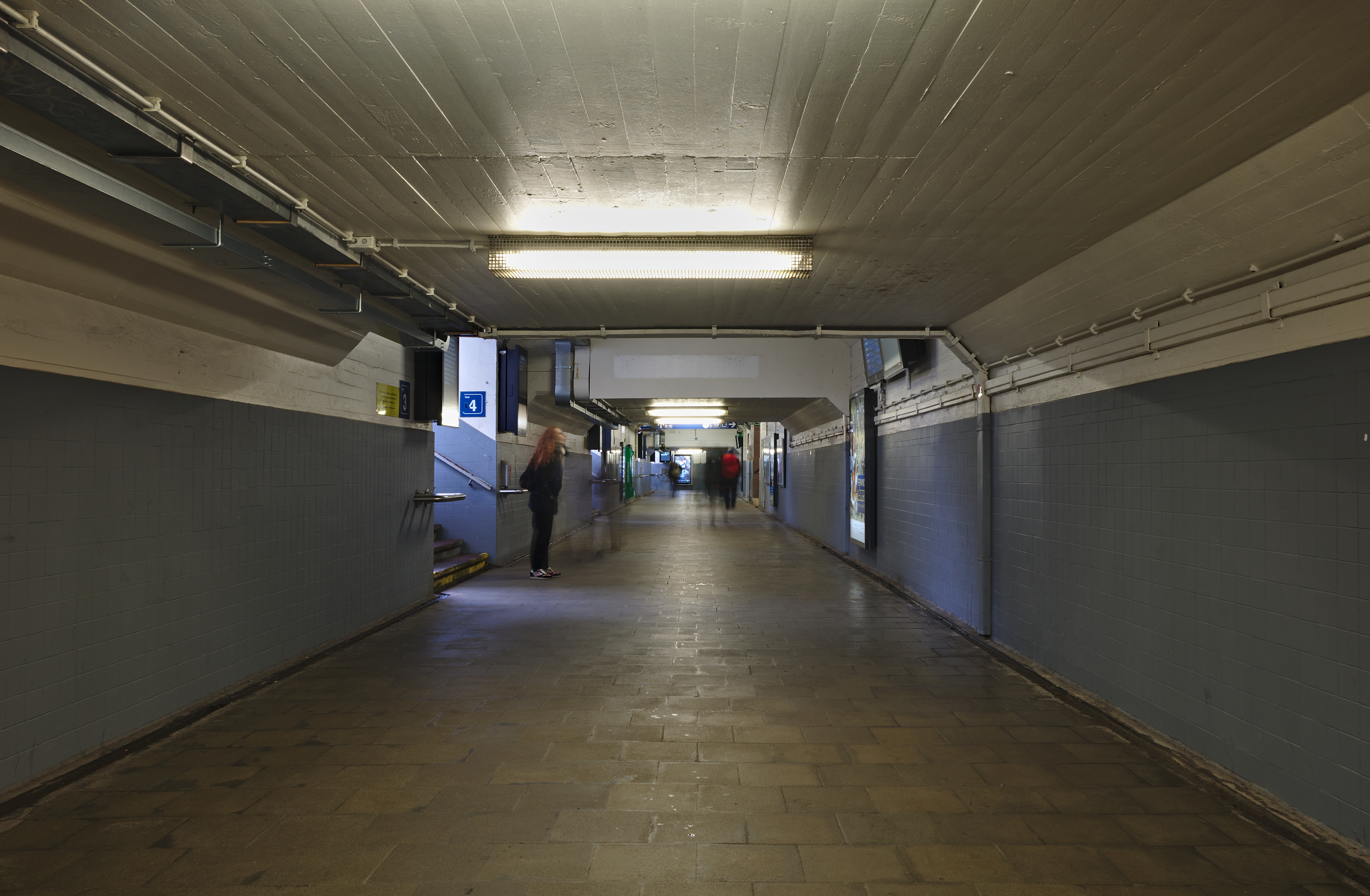
Tunnel connecting the tracks on the south side

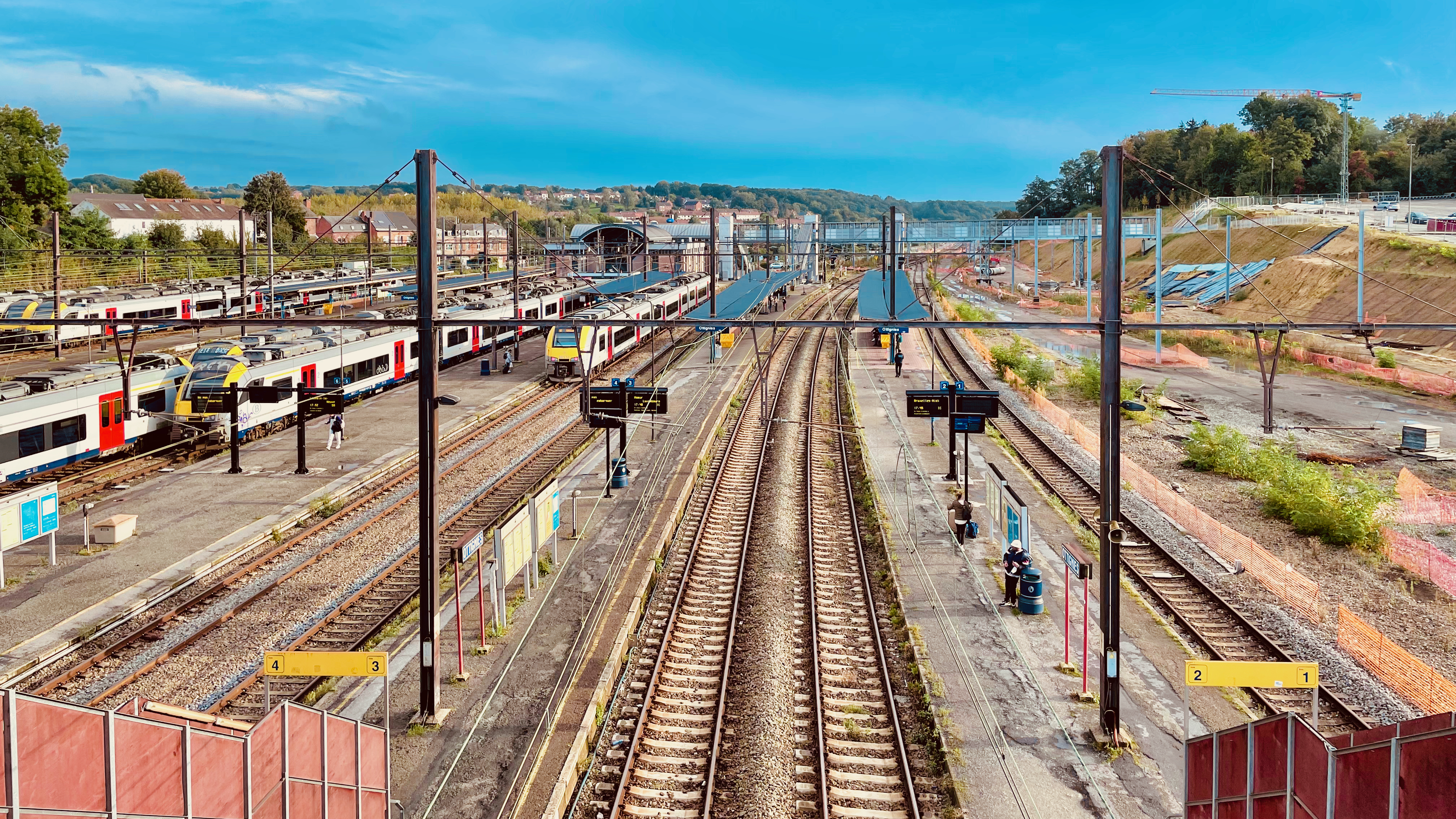
Looking down at the platforms and tracks from the north side

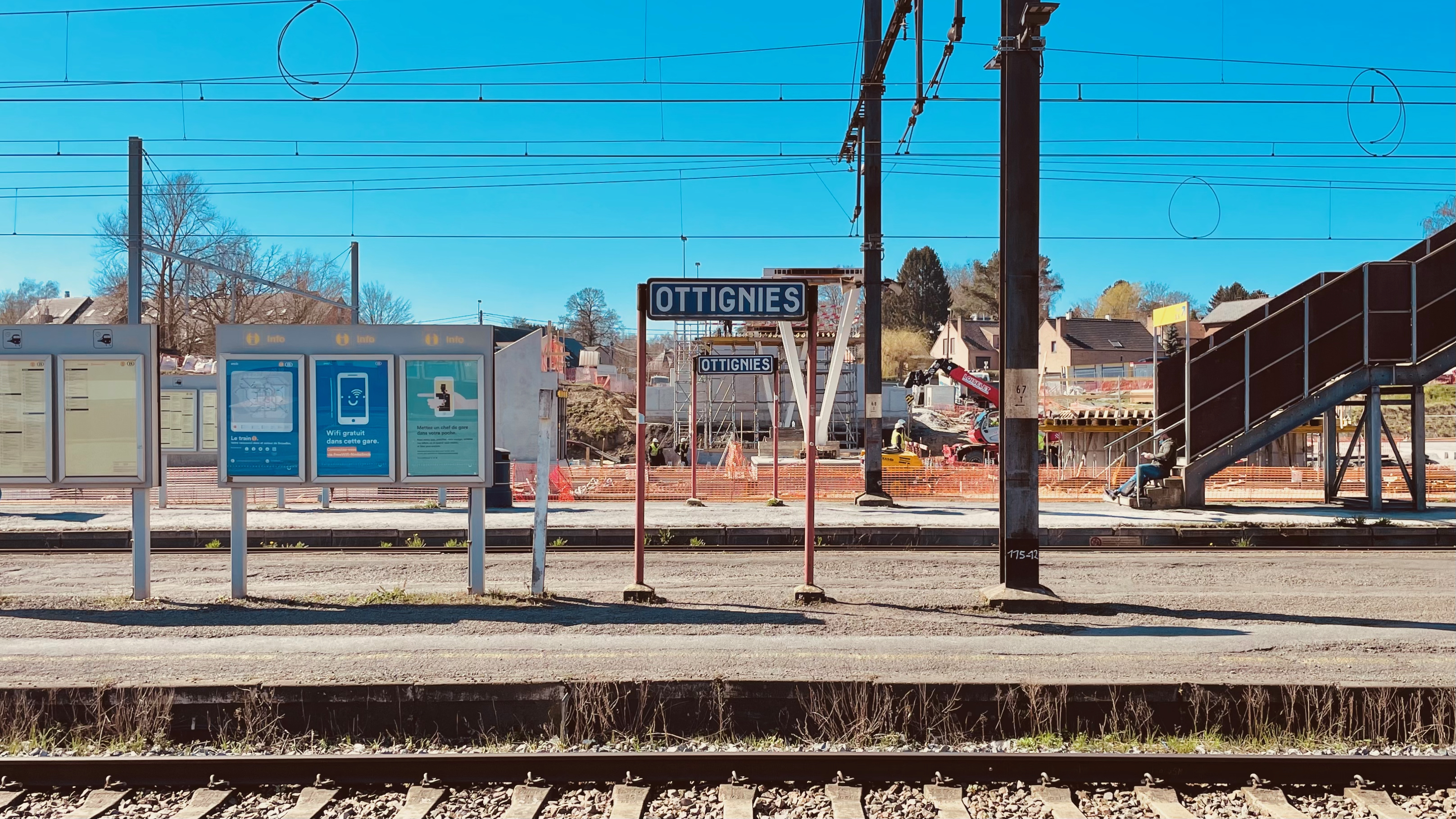
Place name sign on a platform

== See also ==
- List of railway stations in Belgium
- Rail transport in Belgium
