= Dinant railway station =

Railway station in Namur, Belgium

Dinant
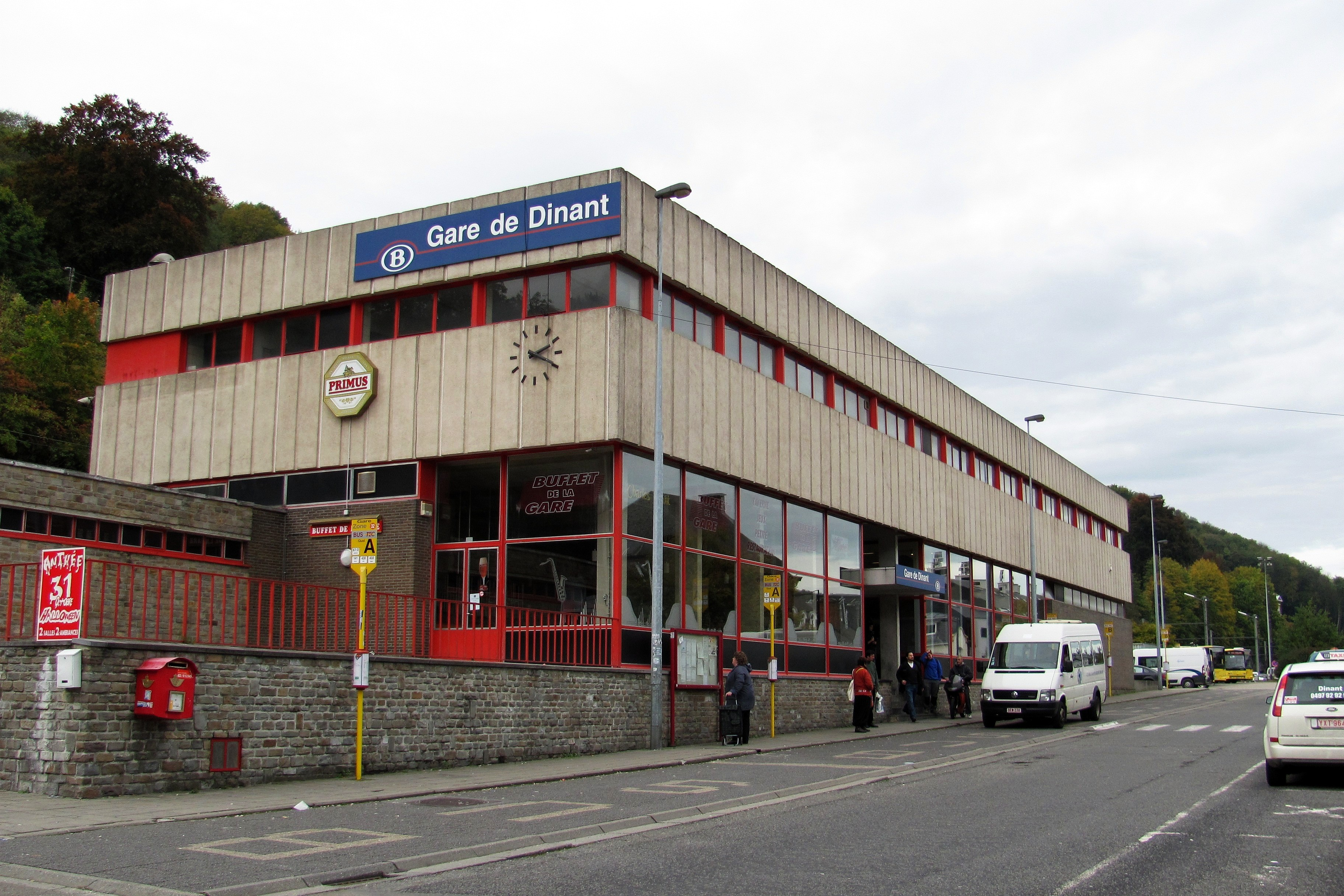
- Dinant railway station

General information
- Location: Dinant, Namur; Belgium
- Coordinates: 50°15′40″N 4°54′29″E
- System: Railway Station
- Owner: SNCB/NMBS
- Operator: SNCB/NMBS
- Line: 154
- Platforms: 3

Other information
- Station code: NDT

History
- Opened: 5 February 1862; 164 years ago

Passengers
- 1,409
Location
- Location within Belgium Location within Europe

Dinant railway station (French: Gare de Dinant; Dutch: Station Dinant) (Note: Officially Dinant) is a railway station in Dinant, Namur, Belgium. The station is operated by the National Railway Company of Belgium (SNCB/NMBS).

== Train services ==
The station is served by the following services:

- Intercity services (IC 17) Dinant - Namur - Brussels National Airport
- Local services Namur - Dinant - Libramont

== Gallery ==
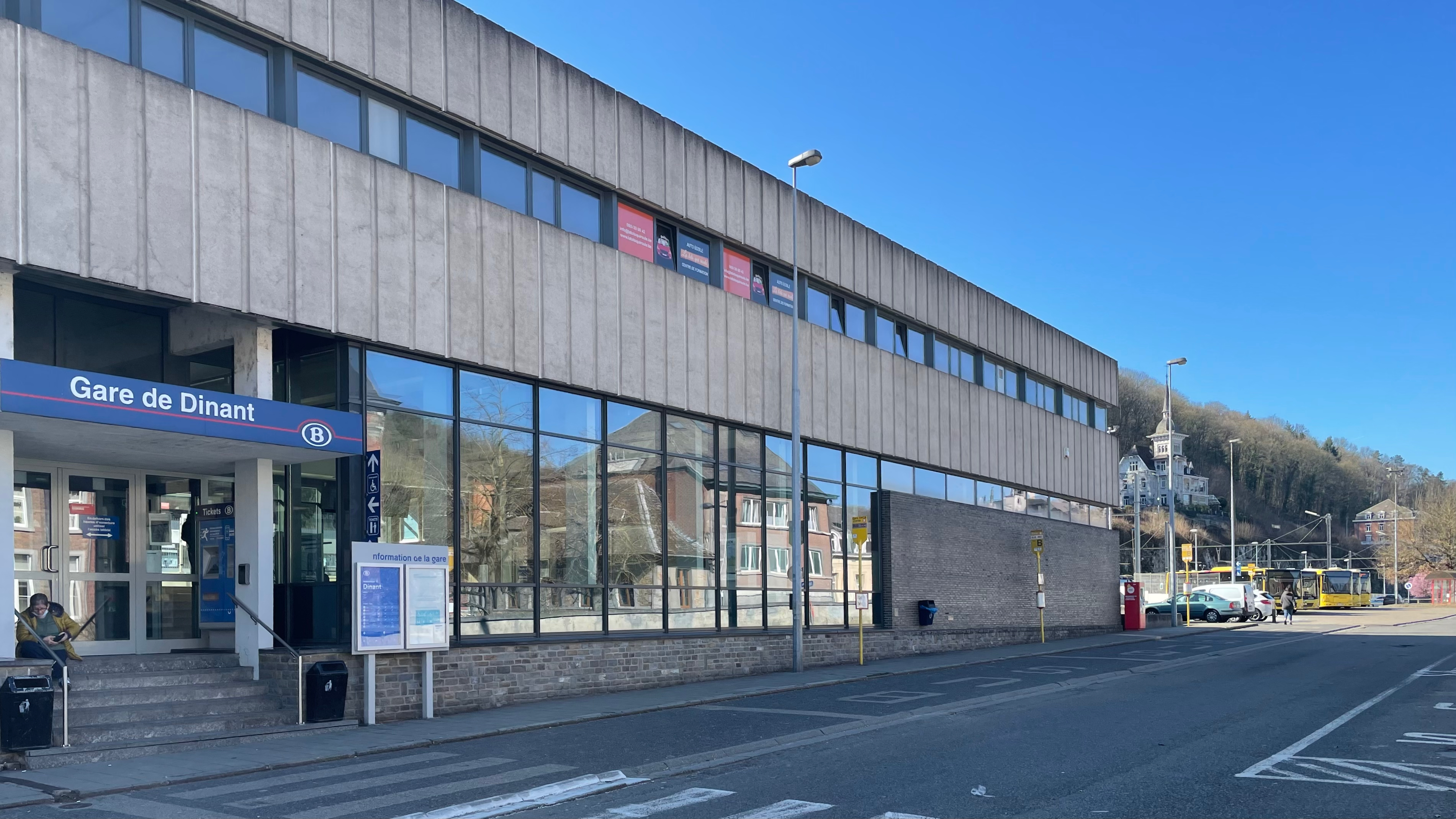
Frontal view

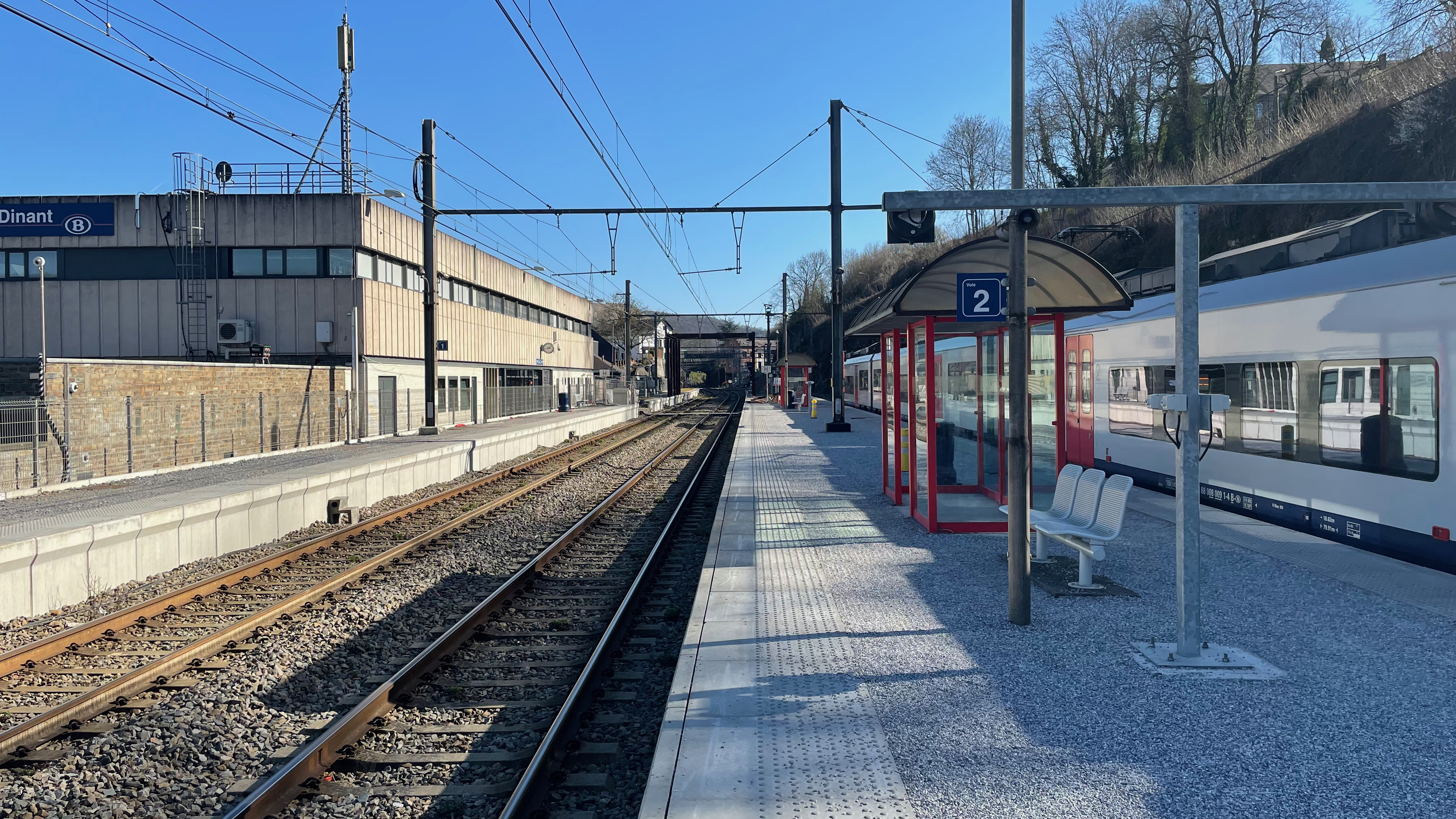
View of the platforms and tracks

== See also ==
- List of railway stations in Belgium
- Rail transport in Belgium
