= List of Belgian railway services =

This is an index of all passenger rail services operated in Belgium.

Passenger rail services in Belgium are operated by NMBS/SNCB.

The Belgian rail network is organised into three main domestic passenger train categories on the main lines, these are:

- Intercity (IC) trains–An express, limited-stop service, often calling only at major railway stations; in some cases it has stops at all stations along part of the route.
- Local (L) trains (Lokale treinen / trains Locaux)–A local service calling at all stations along the route.
- Regional (S) trains–A suburban service calling at all stations along the route.

To cater for the large number of commuter workers, especially into Brussels, complementary peak-hours trains run on mornings and late afternoons of working days, they are classified as P trains.

The Brussels S Train service was added in December 2015 and took over a good deal of the L trains. S Trains were later also introduced to Antwerp, Liège, Gent and Charleroi.

International (high speed) services operate to countries such as the Netherlands, France, Germany, Luxembourg, Austria and UK. These are operated by Eurostar, NS International, Deutsche Bahn, ÖBB Nightjet and SNCF, Arriva and European Sleeper

Below the train services are arranged by type, and for each type ordered by number. All services are correct to May 2020.

== Services ==
International
Route	Type	Stops	Frequency	Notes
Brussels–London	Eurostar	Brussels-South–Lille Europe–Calais–Ashford–Ebbsfleet–London St Pancras	9x per day	
Amsterdam–Paris	Eurostar	Amsterdam–Schiphol–Rotterdam–Antwerpen-Centraal–Brussels-South–Paris Nord	12x per day	
Essen–Paris	Eurostar	Essen–Duisburg–Düsseldorf Airport–Düsseldorf–Cologne–Aachen–Liège-Guillemins–Brussels-South–Paris Nord	5x per day	
Amsterdam–Bourg-Saint-Maurice	Eurostar	Amsterdam–Schiphol–Rotterdam–Antwerpen-Centraal–Brussels-South–Chambéry-Challes-les-Eaux–Albertville–Moûtiers-Salins-Brides-les-Bains–Aime-La Plagne–Landry–Bourg-Saint-Maurice	1x per week in winter	
Amsterdam–Marseille	Eurostar	Amsterdam–Schiphol–Rotterdam–Antwerpen-Centraal–Brussels-South–Valence TGV–Avignon TGV–Aix-en-Provence TGV–Marseille	1x per week in summer	
Brussels–Frankfurt	IC E	Brussels-South–Brussels-North–Liège-Guillemins–Aachen–Cologne–Frankfurt Flughafen Fernbahnhof–Frankfurt (Main)	6x per day	
Brussels–Marseille	TGV	Brussels-South–Lille Europe–Aéroport Charles de Gaulle 2 TGV–Marne-la-Vallée–Chessy–Lyon-Part-Dieu–Avignon TGV–Aix-en-Provence TGV–Marseille	2x per day	
Brussels–Montpellier	TGV	Brussels-South–Lille Europe–Aéroport Charles de Gaulle 2 TGV–Marne-la-Vallée–Chessy–Lyon-Part-Dieu–Valence TGV–Nîmes–Montpellier		
Brussels–Lyon	TGV	Brussels-South–Lille Europe–Aéroport Charles de Gaulle 2 TGV–Marne-la-Vallée–Chessy–Lyon-Perrache		
Brussels–Rennes	TGV	Brussels-South–Lille Europe–TGV Haute-Picardie–Aéroport Charles de Gaulle 2 TGV–Marne-la-Vallée–Chessy–Massy TGV–Le Mans–Rennes		
Brussels–Nantes	TGV	Brussels-South–Lille Europe–TGV Haute-Picardie–Aéroport Charles de Gaulle 2 TGV–Marne-la-Vallée–Chessy–Massy TGV–Le Mans–Angers–Nantes		
Brussels–Strasbourg	TGV	Brussels-South–Lille Europe–Aéroport Charles de Gaulle 2 TGV–Champagne-Ardenne TGV–Lorraine TGV–Strasbourg	2x per day	Replacement of EC Iris and Vauban
Brussels-Berlin-Prague	European Sleeper	Brussels-South–Antwerpen-Centraal–Roosendaal–Rotterdam Centraal–Den Haag HS–Schiphol Airport–Amsterdam Centraal–Amersfoort Centraal–Deventer–Bad Bentheim–Berlin Hbf–Berlin Ostbhf–Dresden Hauptbahnhof–Praha hlavní nádraží	3x per week	Night train service
Brussels–Vienna	ÖBB Nightjet	Brussels-South–Brussels-North–Liège-Guillemins–Aachen–Cologne–Bonn-Beuel–Koblenz–Mainz–Frankfurt Flughafen Fernbahnhof–Frankfurt (Main) Süd–Nuremberg–Regensburg–Passau–Wels–Linz–Amstetten NÖ–St. Pölten–Wien Meidling–Vienna	3x per week	Night train service
Antwerp–Lille (IC 04)	Intercity	Antwerpen-Centraal–Antwerpen-Berchem–Sint-Niklaas–Lokeren –Gent-Dampoort–Gent-Sint-Pieters–Waregem–Kortrijk–Mouscron–Tourcoing–Roubaix–Lille Flandres	1x per hour	Trains split/join at Kortrijk
Brussels–Luxembourg (IC 16)	Intercity	Brussels-South–Brussels-Central–Brussels-North–Brussels-Schuman–Brussels-Luxembourg–Ottignies–Gembloux–Namur–Ciney–Marloie–Jemelle–Libramont–Marbehan–Arlon–Luxembourg	1x per hour	
Lille–Namur (IC 19)	Intercity	Lille Flandres–Lezennes–Hellemmes–Ascq–Baisieux–Froyennes–Tournai–Saint-Ghislain–Mons–La Louvière-Sud–Charleroi-Sud–Tamines–Namur	1x per hour	
Liège–Luxembourg (IC 33)	Intercity	Liers–Milmort–Herstal–Liège-Saint-Lambert–Liège-Carré–Liège-Guillemins–Angleur–Poulseur–Rivage–Aywaille–Coo–Trois-Ponts–Vielsalm–Gouvy–Troisvierges–Clervaux–Drauffelt–Wilwerwiltz–Kautenbach–Ettelbruck–Mersch–Luxembourg	1x per hour week, 1tp2h weekends	
Amsterdam–Brussels (IC 35)	Intercity	Amsterdam Centraal–Schiphol–Den Haag Hollands Spoor–Rotterdam Centraal–Noorderkempen–Antwerpen-Centraal–Antwerpen-Berchem–Mechelen–Brussels Airport-Zaventem–Brussels-North–BrusseL Centraal–Brussels-South	1x per hour	
Spa–Aachen (L 09)	Local train	Spa-Géronstère–Spa–Franchimont–Theux–Juslenville–Pepinster-Cité–Pepinster–Verviers-Central–Verviers-Palais–Dolhain-Gileppe–Welkenraedt–Hergenrath–Aachen Hbf		
Arlon -Luxemburg	Local train	Arlon–Kleinbettingen–Luxembourg	2x per hour	
Athus–Luxemburg	Local train	Athus–Rodange–Lamadelaine–Pétange–Bascharage-Sanem–Schouweiler–Dippach-Reckange–Leudelange–Hollerich–Luxembourg	2x per hour	
Roosendaal–Puurs (S32)	S-train	Roosendaal–Essen–Wildert–Kalmthout–Kijkuit–Heide–Kapellen–Sint-Mariaburg–Ekeren–Antwerpen-Noorderdokken–Antwerpen-Luchtbal–Antwerpen-Centraal–Antwerpen-Berchem–Antwerpen-Zuid–Hoboken-Polder–Hemiksem–Schelle–Niel–Boom–Ruisbroek-Sauvegarde–Puurs	1x per hour Roosendaal Puurs 2x per hour Antwerp-Puurs	
Liège-Guillemins–Maastricht (S-43 RE18)	S-train in Belgium	Liège-Guillemins – Bressoux – Visé – Eijsden – Maastricht Randwijck – Maastricht - Meerssen - Valkenburg – Heerlen – Landgraaf - Herzogenrath - Aachen West - Aachen Hbf	1x per hour	

National Intercity
Route	Stops	Frequency	Notes
IC 01	Oostende–Brugge–Gent-Sint-Pieters–Brussels-South–Brussels-Central–Brussels-North–Leuven–Liège-Guillemins–Verviers-Central–Welkenraedt–Eupen	1x per hour	
IC 02	Oostende–Brugge–Gent-Sint-Pieters–Gent-Dampoort–Lokeren–Sint-Niklaas–Beveren–Antwerpen-Zuid–Antwerpen-Berchem–Antwerpen-Centraal	1x per hour	
IC 03	Blankenberge–Brugge–Aalter–Gent-Sint-Pieters–Brussels-South–Brussels-Central–Brussels-North–Leuven–Tienen–Landen–Sint-Truiden–Alken–Hasselt–Kiewit–Bokrijk–Genk	1x per hour	
IC 04	Antwerpen-Centraal–Antwerpen-Berchem–Sint-Niklaas–Lokeren (- Beervelde)–Gent-Dampoort–Gent-Sint-Pieters–Waregem–Kortrijk–Mouscron–Tourcoing–Roubaix–Lille Flandres	1x per hour	Trains split/join at Kortrijk
IC 04	Antwerpen-Centraal–Antwerpen-Berchem–Sint-Niklaas–Lokeren (- Beervelde)–Gent-Dampoort–Gent-Sint-Pieters–Waregem–Kortrijk–Bissegem–Wevelgem–Menen–Wervik–Komen–Ieper–Poperinge	1x per hour	Trains split/join at Kortrijk
IC 05	Antwerpen-Centraal–Antwerpen-Berchem–Mechelen–Brussels-North–Brussels-Central–Brussels-South–Braine-l'Alleud–Nivelles–Luttre–Marchienne-au-Pont–Charleroi-Central	1x per hour	Does not operate at weekends
IC 06	Tournai–Leuze–Ath–Silly–Enghien–Halle–Brussels-South–Brussels-Central–Brussels-North–Diegem–Zaventem–Brussels Airport-Zaventem	1x per hour	
IC 06A	Mons–Jurbise–Soignies–Braine-le-Comte–Brussels-South–Brussels-Central–Brussels-North–Brussels Airport-Zaventem	1x per hour	
IC 07	Antwerpen-Centraal–Antwerpen-Berchem–Mechelen–Brussels-North–Brussels-Central–Brussels-South–Braine-l'Alleud–Nivelles–Luttre–Marchienne-au-Pont–Charleroi-Central	1x per hour	Does not operate at weekends
IC 08	Antwerpen-Centraal–Antwerpen-Berchem–Mechelen–Brussels Airport-Zaventem–Leuven–Aarschot–Langdorp–Testelt–Zichem–Diest–Schulen–Hasselt	1x per hour	
IC 09	Antwerpen-Centraal–Antwerpen-Berchem–Lier–Heist-op-den-Berg–Aarschot–Leuven	1x per hour	Weekdays
IC 09	Antwerpen-Centraal–Antwerpen-Berchem–Lier–Heist-op-den-Berg–Aarschot–Diest–Hasselt–Diepenbeek–Bilzen–Tongeren–Glons–Liers–Milmort–Herstal–Liège-Saint-Lambert–Liège-Carré–Liège-Guillemins	1x per hour	Weekends
IC 10	Antwerpen-Centraal–Antwerpen-Berchem–Lier–Herentals–Olen–Geel–Mol–Lommel–Overpelt–Neerpelt–Hamont	1x per hour	Trains join/split at Mol
IC 10	Antwerpen-Centraal–Antwerpen-Berchem–Lier–Herentals–Olen–Geel–Mol–Balen–Leopoldsburg–Beverlo–Beringen–Heusden–Zolder–Zonhoven–Hasselt	1x per hour	Trains join/split at Mol
IC 11	Binche–Leval–La Louvière-Sud–La Louvière-Centre–Ecaussinnes–Braine-le-Comte–Tubize–Halle–Brussels-South–Brussels-Central–Brussels-North–Vilvoorde–Mechelen–Lier–Herentals–Tielen–Turnhout	1x per hour	Does not operate at weekends
IC 12	Kortrijk–Harelbeke–Waregem–Deinze–De Pinte–Gent-Sint-Pieters–Brussels-South–Brussels-Central–Brussels-North–Leuven–Liège-Guillemins–Angleur–Pepinster–Verviers-Central–Welkenraedt	1x per hour	Does not operate between Gent and Welkenraedt at weekends
IC 13	Hasselt–Diepenbeek–Bilzen–Tongeren–Glons–Liers–Milmort–Herstal–Liège-Saint-Lambert–Liège-Carré–Liège-Guillemins–Bressoux–Visé–Eijsden–Maastricht Randwijck–Maastricht	1x per hour	Weekdays
IC 13	Liège-Guillemins–Bressoux–Visé–Eijsden–Maastricht Randwijck–Maastricht	1x per hour	Weekends
IC 14	Quiévrain–Thulin–Hainin–Boussu–Saint-Ghislain–Quaregnon–Jemappes–Mons–Jurbise–Soignies–Braine-le-Comte–Halle–Brussels-South–Brussels-Central–Brussels-North–Leuven–Tienen–Landen–Waremme–Ans–Liège-Guillemins	1x per hour	Does not operate at weekends
IC 15	Noorderkempen–Antwerpen-Luchtbal–Antwerpen-Centraal	1x per hour	
IC 16	Brussels-South–Brussels-Central–Brussels-North–Brussels-Schuman–Brussels-Luxembourg–Ottignies–Gembloux–Namur–Ciney–Marloie–Jemelle–Libramont–Marbehan–Arlon–Luxembourg	1x per hour	
IC 17	Brussels Airport-Zaventem–Bordet–Brussels-Schuman–Brussels-Luxembourg–Etterbeek–Ottignies–Gembloux–Namur–Jambes–Lustin–Godinne–Yvoir–Dinant	1x per hour	Weekdays
IC 17	Brussels-South–Brussels-Central–Brussels-North–Brussels-Schuman–Brussels-Luxembourg–Etterbeek–Ottignies–Gembloux–Namur–Jambes–Lustin–Godinne–Yvoir–Dinant	1x per hour	Weekends
IC 18	Brussels-South–Brussels-Central–Brussels-North–Brussels-Schuman–Brussels-Luxembourg–Etterbeek–Ottignies–Gembloux–Namur–Andenne–Statte–Huy–Flémalle-Haute–Liège-Guillemins–Liège-Carré–Liège-Saint-Lambert	1x per hour	Does not operate at weekends
IC 19	Lille Flandres–Lezennes–Hellemmes–Ascq–Baisieux–Froyennes–Tournai–Saint-Ghislain–Mons–La Louvière-Sud–Charleroi-Sud–Tamines–Namur	1x per hour	
IC 20	Gent-Sint-Pieters–Merelbeke–Melle–Wetteren–Lede–Aalst–Denderleeuw–Liedekerke–Brussels-South–Brussels-Central–Brussels-North–Aarschot–Diest–Hasselt–Diepenbeek–Bilzen–Tongeren	1x per hour	Weekdays
IC 20	Gent-Sint-Pieters–Merelbeke–Melle–Wetteren–Lede–Aalst–Denderleeuw–Liedekerke–Brussels-South–Brussels-Central–Brussels-North–Jette–Dendermonde–Zele–Lokeren	1x per hour	Weekends
IC 21	Gent-Sint-Pieters–Wetteren–Dendermonde–Londerzeel–Mechelen–Muizen–Hever–Boortmeerbeek–Haacht–Wespelaar-Tildonk–Hambos–Wijgmaal–Leuven	1x per hour	Does not operate at weekends
IC 22	Essen–Kalmthout–Heide–Kapellen–Ekeren–Antwerpen-Centraal–Antwerpen-Berchem–MortseL Oude-God–Mechelen-Nekkerspoel–Mechelen–Vilvoorde–Brussels-North–Brussels-Central–Brussels-South	1x per hour	Weekdays
IC 22	Antwerpen-Centraal–Antwerpen-Berchem–MortseL Oude-God–Mechelen-Nekkerspoel–Mechelen–Vilvoorde–Brussels-North–Brussels-Central–Brussels-South–Halle–Tubize–Braine-le-Comte–Ecaussinnes–La Louvière-Centre–La Louvière-Sud–Leval–Binche	1x per hour	Weekends
IC 23	Oostende–Brugge–Zedelgem–Torhout–Lichtervelde–Roeselaere–Izegem–Ingelmunster–Kortrijk–Oudenaarde–Munkzwalm–Zottegem–Herzele–Burst–Haaltert–Denderleeuw–Brussels-South–Brussels-Central–Brussels-North–Brussels Airport-Zaventem	1x per hour	
IC 23A	Brugge–Aalter–Gent-Sint-Pieters–Brussels-South–Brussels-Central–Brussels-North–Brussels Airport-Zaventem	1x per hour	Weekdays
IC 23A	Gent-Sint-Pieters–Brussels-South–Brussels-Central–Brussels-North–Brussels Airport-Zaventem	1x per hour	Weekends
IC 24	Charleroi-Sud–Jamioulx–Ham-sur-Heure–Cour-sur-Heure–Berzée–Walcourt–Yves-Gomezée–Philippeville–Mariembourg–Couvin	1x per hour	
IC 25	Mons–La Louvière-Sud–Marchienne-au-Pont–Charleroi Sud–Châtelet–Tamines–Auvelais–Jemeppe-sur-Sambre–Namur–Andenne–Statte–Huy–Flémalle-Haute–Liège-Guillemins–Liège-Carré–Liège-Saint-Lambert–Herstal	1x per hour	Weekdays
IC 25	Mouscron–Hersaux–Tournai–Antoing–Péruwelz–Blaton–Saint-Ghislain–Quaregnon–Jemappes–Mons–La Louvière-Sud–Marchienne-au-Pont–Charleroi Sud–Châtelet–Tamines–Auvelais–Jemeppe-sur-Sambre–Namur–Andenne–Statte–Huy–Flémalle-Haute–Liège-Guillemins–Liège-Carré–Liège-Saint-Lambert–Herstal–Milmort–Liers	1x per hour	Weekends
IC 26	Kortrijk–Mouscron–Hersaux–Froyennes–Tournai–Leuze–Ath–Silly–Enghien–Halle–Brussels-South–Brussels-Central–Brussels-North–Jette–Dendermonde–Zele–Lokeren–Sinaai–Belsele–Sint-Niklaas	1x per hour	Does not operate at weekends
IC 27	Brussels Airport-Zaventem–Bordet–Brussels-Schuman–Brussels-Luxembourg–Etterbeek–Boondael–Vivier d'Oie–Saint-Job–Linkebeek–Sint-Genesius-Rode–Waterloo–Braine-l'Alleud–Lillois–Nivelles–Obaix-Buzet–Luttre–Courcelles-Motte–Roux–Marchienne-au-Pont–Charleroi-Sud	1x per hour	Does not operate at weekends
IC 28	Gent-Sint-Pieters–Gent-Dampoort–Beervelde–Lokeren–Sint-Niklaas–Antwerpen-Zuid–Antwerpen-Berchem–Antwerpen-Centraal	1x per hour	Does not operate at weekends
IC 29	De Panne–Koksijde–Veurne–Diksmuide–Kortemark–Lichtervelde–Tielt–Deinze–De Pinte–Gent-Sint-Pieters–Wetteren–Schellebelle–Serskamp–Lede–Aalst–Erembodegem–Denderleeuw–Liedekerke–Brussels-South–Brussels-Central–Brussels-North–Brussels Airport-Zaventem–Leuven–Vertrijk–Tienen–Ezemaal–Neerwinden–Landen	1x per hour	Leuven–Landen only every 2 hours on weekends
IC 30	Antwerpen-Centraal–Antwerpen-Berchem–Lier–Kessel–Nijlen–Bouwel–Herentals–Tielen–Turnhout	1x per hour	
IC 31	Antwerpen-Centraal–Antwerpen-Berchem–MortseL Oude-God–Mechelen-Nekkerspoel–Mechelen–Vilvoorde–Brussels-North–Brussels-Central–Brussels-South	1x per hour	Weekdays
IC 31	Antwerpen-Centraal–Antwerpen-Berchem–MortseL Oude-God–Mechelen-Nekkerspoel–Mechelen–Vilvoorde–Brussels-North–Brussels-Central–Brussels-South–Braine-l'Alleud–Nivelles–Luttre–Marchienne-au-Pont–Charleroi-Sud	1x per hour	Weekends
IC 32	Brugge–Zedelgem–Torhout–Lichtervelde–Roeselaere–Izegem–Ingelmunster–Kortrijk	1x per hour; 2x per hour on weekends	
IC 33	Liers–Milmort–Herstal–Liège-Saint-Lambert–Liège-Carré–Liège-Guillemins–Angleur–Poulseur–Rivage–Aywaille–Coo–Trois-Ponts–Vielsalm–Gouvy–Troisvierges–Clervaux–Drauffelt–Wilwerwiltz–Kautenbach–Ettelbruck–Mersch–Luxembourg	Every 2 hours	
IC 35	Amsterdam Centraal–Schiphol–Den Haag Hollands Spoor–Rotterdam Centraal–Dordrecht–Roosendaal–Antwerpen-Centraal–Antwerpen-Berchem–Mechelen–Brussels Airport-Zaventem–Brussels-North–BrusseL Centraal–Brussels-South	1x per hour	

National local services
Route	Stops	Frequency	Notes
L 01	Namur–Marche-les-Dames–Namêche–Sclaigneaux–Château de Seilles–Andenne–Bas-Oha–Statte–Huy–Ampsin–Amay–Haute-Flône–Engis–Flémalle-Haute–Leman–Flémalle-Grande–Jemeppe-sur-Meuse–Pont-de-Seraing–Sclessin–Liège-Guillemins	1x per hour; every 2 hours at weekends	
L 02	Zeebrugge-Strand / Zeebrugge-Dorp–Lissewege–Brugge-Sint-Pieters–Brugge–Oostkamp–Beernem–Maria-Aalter–Aalter–Bellem–Hansbeke–Landegem–Drongen–Gent-Sint-Pieters–Merelbeke–Melle–Kwatrecht–Wetteren–Schellebelle–Wichelen–Schoonaarde–Oudegem–Dendermonde–Baasrode-Zuid–Buggenhout–Malderen–Londerzeel–Kapelle-op-den-Bos–Mechelen	1x per hour	Weekdays
L 02	Zeebrugge-Strand / Zeebrugge-Dorp–Lissewege–Brugge-Sint-Pieters–Brugge–Oostkamp–Beernem–Maria-Aalter–Aalter–Bellem–Hansbeke–Landegem–Drongen–Gent-Sint-Pieters	Every 2 hours	Weekends
L 03	Leuven–Wezemaal–Aarschot–Langdorp–Testelt–Zichem–Diest–Schulen–Hasselt	1x per hour	Not weekends
L 04	Braine-le-Comte–Soignies–Neufvilles–Masnuy-Saint-Pierre–Jurbise	1x per hour	Does not operate at weekends
L 05	Eeklo–Waarschoot–Sleidinge–Evergem–Wondelgem–Gent-Dampoort–Gentbrugge–Gent-Sint-Pieters- De Pinte–Eke-Nazareth–Gavere-Asper–Zingem–Eine–Oudenaarde–Ronse	1x per hour	Trains split/join at Oudenaarde
L 05	Eeklo–Waarschot–Sleidinge–Evergem–Wondelgem–Gent-Dampoort–Gentbrugge–Gent-Sint-Pieters- De Pinte–Eke-Nazareth–Gavere-Asper–Zingem–Eine–Oudenaarde–Anzegem–Vichte–Kortrijk	1x per hour	Trains split/join at Oudenaarde; does not operate at weekends
L 06	Luttre–Pont-à-Celles–Gouy-lez-Piéton–Godarville–Manage–La Louvière-Centre–La Louvière-Sud–Morlanwelz–Carnières–Piéton–Forchies–Marchienne-au-Pont–Charleroi-Sud	1x per hour	Weekdays
L 06	Manage–La Louvière-Centre–La Louvière-Sud–Morlanwelz–Carnières–Piéton–Forchies–Marchienne-au-Pont–Charleroi-Sud	Every 2 hours	Weekends
L 06A	Manage–Godarville–Gouy-lez-Piéton–Pont-à-Celles–Luttre–Courcelles-Motte–Roux–Marchienne-au-Pont–Charleroi-Sud	Every 2 hours	Weekends
L 07	Erquelinnes–Erquelinnes-Village–Solre-sur-Sambre–Labuissière–Fontaine-Valmont–Lobbes–Thuin–Hourpes–Landelies–Marchienne-Zone–Charleroi-Sud	1x per hour; every 2 hours at weekends	Stations in italics are not served at weekends
L 08	Ottignies–Mont-Saint-Guibert–Blanmont–Chastre–Ernage–Gembloux–Lonzée–Beuzet–Saint-Denis-Bovesse–Rhisnes–Namur	1x per hour; every 2 hours at weekends	
L 09	Spa-Géronstère–Spa–Franchimont–Theux–Juslenville–Pepinster-Cité–Pepinster–Verviers-Central–Verviers-Palais–Dolhain-Gileppe–Welkenraedt–Hergenrath–Aachen Hbf		
L 10	Ciney–Leignon–Chapois–Haversin–Aye–Marloie–Jemelle–Forrières–Grupont–Poix-Saint-Hubert–Libramont	Every 2 hours	
L 11	Namur–Jambes–Lustin–Godinne–Yvoir–Dinant–Anseremme–Gendron-Celles–Houyet–Beauraing–Gedinne–Graide–Carlsbourg–Paliseul–Bertrix–Libramont	Every 2 hours	
L 12	Libramont–Neufchâteau–Marbehan–Habay–Stockem–Viville–Arlon–Kleinbettingen–Luxembourg	Every 2 hours	
L 13	Libramont–Bertrix–Florenville–Virton–Halanzy–Aubange–Athus–Messancy–Arlon	Every 2 hours	Does not operate between Virton and Arlon at weekends
L 14	Ottignies–Céroux Mousty–Court Saint Etienne–Faux–La Roche–Villers la Ville–Tilly–Ligny–Fleurus–Lodelinsart–Charleroi-West–Charleroi-Sud–Couillet–Châtelet–Le Campinaire–Farciennes–Aiseau–Tamines–Auvelais–Jemeppe-sur-Sambre–Moustier–Franière–Floreffe–Flawinne–Ronet–Namur–Jambes	1x per hour; every 2 hours at weekends	Does not operate between Namur and Jambes at weekends
L 15	Liers–Milmort–Herstal–Liège-Saint-Lambert–Liège-Carré–Liège-Guillemins–Angleur–Tilff–Méry–Hony–Esneux–Poulseur–Rivage–Comblain-la-Tour–Hamoir–Sy–Bomal–Barvaux–Melreux-Hotton–Marche-en-Famenne–Marloie	1x per hour	
L 16	Namur–Jambes-Est–Dave-Saint-Martin–Naninne–Sart-Bernard–Courrière–Assesse–Natoye–Ciney	1x per hour; every 2 hours at weekends	Stations in italics are served at weekends
L 17	Herstal–Liège-Saint-Lambert–Liège-Carré–Liège-Guillemins–Angleur–Chênée–Trooz–Fraipont–Nessonvaux–Pepinster–Verviers-Central	1x per hour	
L 18	Mons–Saint-Ghislain–Boussu–Hainin–Thulin–Quiévrain	1x per hour	Weekends
L 19	Braine-le-Comte–Écaussinnes–Marche-lez-Écaussinnes–Familleureux–Manage	1x per hour	Weekdays
L 20	Sint-Niklaas–Temse–Bornem–Puurs–Willebroek–Mechelen–Muizen–Hever–Boortmeerbeek–Haacht–Wespelaar-Tildonk–Wijgmaal–Leuven	1x per hour	Weekdays
L 20	Mechelen–Muizen–Boortmeerbeek–Haacht–Wespelaar-Tildonk–Wijgmaal–Leuven	1x per hour	Weekends
L 21	Waremme–Bleret–Remicourt–Momalle–Fexhe-le-Haut-Clocher–Voroux–Bierset-Awans–Ans–Liège-Guillemins	1x per hour	Weekdays
L 21	Landen–Waremme–Remicourt–Momalle–Fexhe-le-Haut-Clocher–Bierset-Awans–Ans–Liège-Guillemins	1x per hour	Weekends
L 22	Roosendaal–Essen–Wildert–Kalmthout–Kijkuit–Heide–Kapellen–Sint-Mariaburg–Ekeren–Antwerpen-Noorderdokken–Antwerpen-Luchtbal–Antwerpen-Centraal–Antwerpen-Berchem–Antwerpen-Zuid–Hoboken-Polder–Hemiksem–Schelle–Niel–Boom–Ruisbroek-Sauvegarde–Puurs	1x per hour	Does not operate between Antwerp and Puurs at weekends
L 23	Antwerpen-Centraal–Antwerpen-Berchem–Mortsel–Boechout–Lier–Berlaar–Melkouwen–Heist-op-den-Berg–Booischot–Begijnendijk–Aarschot–Wezemaal–Leuven	1x per hour	
L 24	Antwerpen-Centraal–Antwerpen-Berchem–Mortsel–Boechout–Lier–Kessel–Nijlen–Bouwel–Wolfstee–Herentals–Olen–Geel–Mol	1x per hour	Does not operate at weekends
L 25	Gent-Sint-Pieters–Merelbeke–Melle–Gontrode–Landskouter–Moortsele–Scheldewindeke–Balegem-Dorp–Balegem-Zuid–Zottegem–Lierde–Geraardsbergen	1x per hour	Stations in italics are not served at weekends
L 26	Quévy–Genly–Frameries–Mons–Nimy–Obourg–Havré–Thieu–Bracquegnies–La Louvière-Sud	1x per hour	Weekdays
L 26	Mons–Nimy–Havré–Thieu–Bracquegnies–La Louvière-Sud	Every 2 hours	Weekends
L 27	Sint-Niklaas–Temse–Bornem–Puurs–Willebroek–Mechelen	1x per hour	Weekends
L 28	Gent-Sint-Pieters–Kwatrecht–Wetteren–Schoonaarde–Dendermonde–Buggenhout–Malderen–Londerzeel–Kapelle-op-den-Bos–Mechelen	1x per hour	Weekends
L 29	Geraardsbergen–Acren–Lessines–Houraing–Papignies–Rebaix–Ath–Maffle–Mévergnies-Attre–Brugelette–Cambron-Casteau–Lens–Jurbise–Erbisoeul–Ghlin–Mons–Jemappes–Quaregnon–Saint-Ghislain–Blaton–Péruwelz–Antoing–Tournai	1x per hour; Every 2 hours at weekends	Does not operate between Mons and Tournai at weekends; stations in italics are not served at weekends
L 30	(Dendermonde–Zele -) Lokeren–Sinaai–Belsele–Sint-Niklaas–Nieuwkerken-Waas–Beveren–Melsele–Zwijndrecht–Antwerpen-Zuid–Antwerpen-Berchem–Antwerpen-Centraal	1x per hour	

S Train network
Route	Stops	Frequency	Notes
S1	Antwerpen-Centraal–Antwerpen-Berchem–Mortsel–MortseL Liersesteenweg–Hove–Kontich–Duffel–Sint-Katelijne-Waver–Mechelen-Nekkerspoel–Mechelen–Weerde–Eppegem–Vilvoorde–Buda–Schaarbeek–Brussels-North–Brussels-Congress–Brussels-Central–Brussels-Chapel–Brussels-South–Forest-East–Uccle-Stalle–Uccle-Calevoet–Linkebeek–Holleken–Sint-Genesius-Rode–De Hoek–Waterloo–Braine-l'Alleud–Lillois–Nivelles	2x per hour between Antwerp, Brussels and Nivelles	Weekdays
S1	Antwerpen-Centraal–Antwerpen-Berchem–MortseL Deurnesteenweg–MortseL Oude-God–Hove–Kontich–Duffel–Sint-Katelijne-Waver–Mechelen-Nekkerspoel–Mechelen–Weerde–Eppegem–Vilvoorde–Schaarbeek–Brussels-North–Brussels-Central–Brussels-South	1x per hour	Weekends
S1	Brussels-North–Brussels-Central–Brussels-South–Forest-East–Uccle-Stalle–Uccle-Calevoet–Linkebeek–Holleken–Sint-Genesius-Rode–De Hoek–Waterloo–Braine-l'Alleud–Lillois–Nivelles	1x per hour	Weekends
S2	Leuven–Herent–Veltem–Erps-Kwerps–Kortenberg–Nossegem–Zaventem–Diegem–Haren-South –Schaarbeek–Brussels-North–Brussels-Central–Brussels-South–Forest-South–Ruisbroek–Lot–Buizingen–Halle–Lembeek–Tubize–Hennuyères–Braine-le-Comte	2x per hour	
S3	Dendermonde–Sint-Gillis–Lebbeke–Heizijde–Opwijk–Merchtem–Mollem–Asse–Zellik–Jette–Bockstael–Brussels-North–Brussels-Central–Brussels-South -Denderleeuw–Welle–Haaltert–Ede–Burst–Terhagen -Herzele–Hillegem–Zottegem–Munkzwalm–Sint-Denijs-Boekel–Oudenaarde	1x per hour	Weekdays
S4	Vilvoorde–Haren–Bordet–Evere–Meiser–Merode–Delta–Etterbeek–Brussels-Luxembourg–Brussels-Schuman–Bockstael–Jette–Sint-Agatha-Berchem–Groot-Bijgaarden–Dilbeek–Sint-Martens-Bodegem–Ternat–Essene-Lombeek–Liedekerke–Denderleeuw–Erembodegem–Aalst	1x per hour	Weekdays, stations in italics are served during peak hours
S5	Mechelen–Weerde–Eppegem–Vilvoorde–Haren–Bordet–Evere–Meiser–Brussels-Schuman–Brussels-Luxembourg–Mouterij–Etterbeek–Boondael–Vivier d'Oie–Saint-Job–Moensberg–Beersel–Huizingen–Halle–Enghien–Herne–Tollembeek–Galmaarden–Viane-Moerbeke–Geraardsbergen	2x per hour	Weekdays, stations in italics are served during peak hours
S6	Aalst–Denderleeuw–Iddergem–Okegem–Ninove–Eichem–Appelterre–Zandbergen–Idegem–Schendelbeke–Geraardsbergen–Viane-Moerbeke–Galmaarden–Tollembeek–Herne–Enghien–Halle–Brussels-South–Brussels-Central–Brussels-North–Schaarbeek	1x per hour	Stations in italics are served during peak hours
S7	Mechelen–Muizen–Hofstade–Eppegem–Vilvoorde–Haren–Bordet–Evere–Meiser–Merode–Delta–Boondael–Vivier d'Oie–Saint-Job–Moensberg–Beersel–Huizingen–Halle	1x per hour	
S8	Brussels-South–Brussels-Central–Brussels-North–Brussels-Schuman–Brussels-Luxembourg–Etterbeek–Watermael–Boitsfort–Groenendaal–Hoeilaart–La Hulpe–Genval–Rixensart–Profondsart–Ottignies–Louvain-la-Neuve	2x per hour, 1x per hour at weekends	
S9	Leuven–Herent–Veltem–Erps-Kwerps–Kortenberg–Nossegem–Zaventem–Diegem–Haren–Bordet–Evere–Meiser–Brussels-Schuman–Brussels-Luxembourg–Mouterij–Etterbeek–Boondael–Vivier d'Oie–Saint-Job–Linkebeek–Holleken–Sint-Genesius-Rode–De Hoek–Waterloo–Braine-l'Alleud–Lillois–Nivelles	1x per hour	Weekdays
S10	Dendermonde–Sint-Gillis–Lebbeke–Heizijde–Opwijk–Merchtem–Mollem–Asse–Zellik–Jette–Thurn en Taxis–Simonis–Brussels-West–Brussels-South–Brussels-Central–Brussels-North–Bockstael–Jette–Sint-Agatha-Berchem–Groot-Bijgaarden–Dilbeek–Sint-Martens-Bodegem–Ternat–Essene-Lombeek–Liedekerke–Denderleeuw–Erembodegem–Aalst	1x per hour	
S20	Leuven–Heverlee–Oud-Heverlee–Sint-Joris-Weert–Pécrot–Florival–Archennes–Gastuche–Basse-Wavre–Wavre–Bierges-Walibi–Limal–Ottignies	2x per hour, 1x per hour at weekends	
S81	Schaarbeek–Brussels-Schuman–Brussels-Luxembourg–Etterbeek–Watermael–Boitsfort–Groenendaal–Hoeilaart–La Hulpe–Genval–Rixensart–Profondsart–Ottignies	1x per hour	Weekdays, Peak hours only
