= Ekeren railway station =

Railway station in Antwerp, Belgium

Ekeren
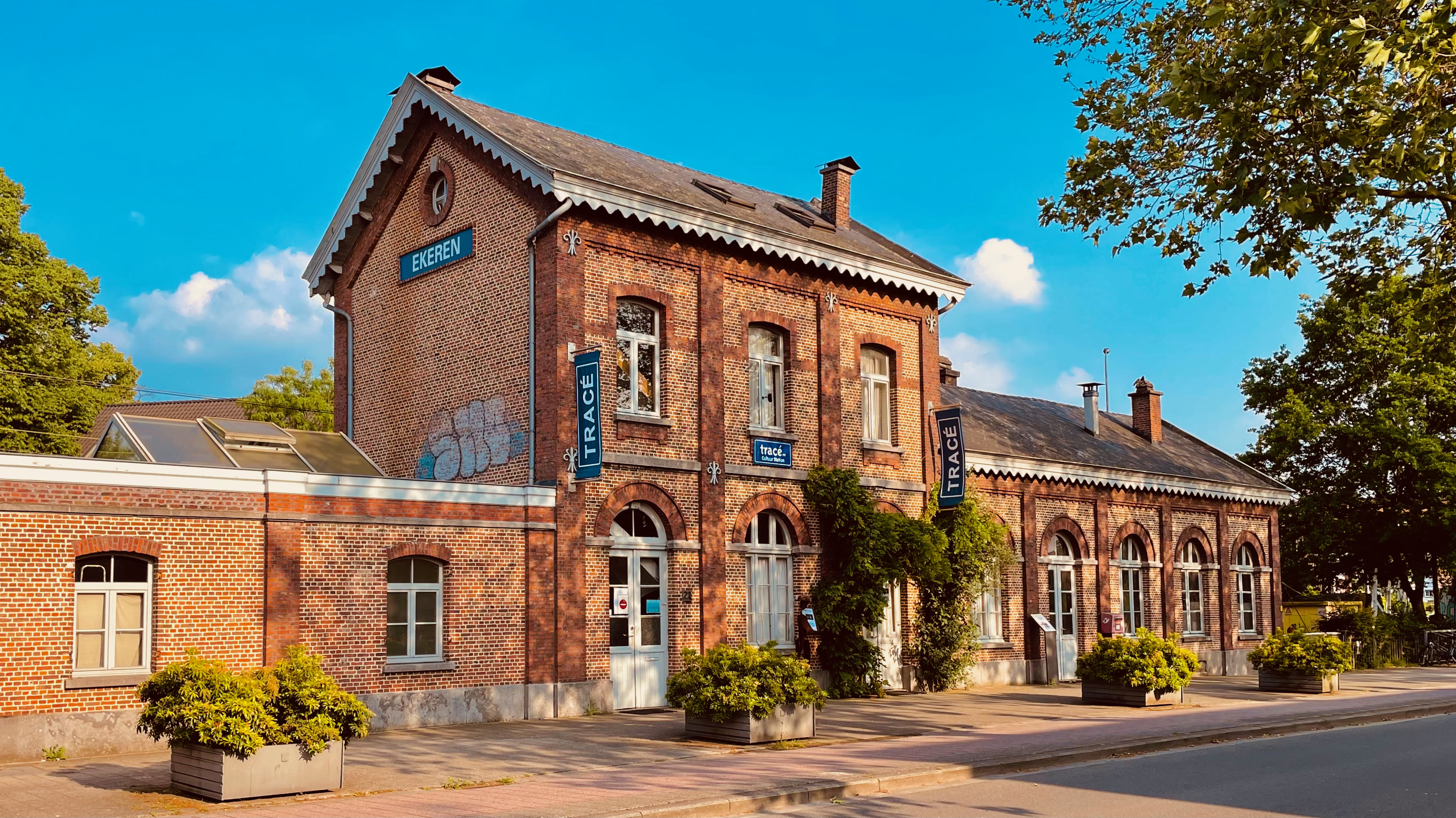
- Ekeren railway station

General information
- Location: Ekeren, Antwerp, Belgium
- Coordinates: 51°16′54″N 4°26′03″E
- System: Railway Station
- Owner: National Railway Company of Belgium
- Line: Line 12
- Platforms: 2
- Tracks: 2

History
- Opened: 3 July 1854

Services
| Preceding station | NMBS/SNCB | Following station |
|---|---|---|
| Kapellen towards Essen | IC 22 | Antwerpen-Centraal towards Bruxelles-Midi / Brussel-Zuid |
| Sint-Mariaburg towards Roosendaal | L 22 | Antwerpen-Noorderdokken towards Puurs |
Location

Ekeren is a railway station in the town of Ekeren, Antwerp, Belgium. The station opened on 3 July 1854 on the Antwerp–Lage Zwaluwe railway, known in Belgium as Line 12.

== Train services ==
The station is served by the following services:

- Intercity services (IC-22) Essen - Antwerp - Mechelen - Brussels (weekdays)
- Local services (L-22) Roosendaal - Essen - Antwerp - Puurs (weekdays)
- Local services (L-22) Roosendaal - Essen - Antwerp (weekends)

== Bus service ==
Bus line 730 serves the station, it is operated by De Lijn.
