= Sint-Mariaburg railway station =

Railway station in Antwerp, Belgium

Sint-Mariaburg
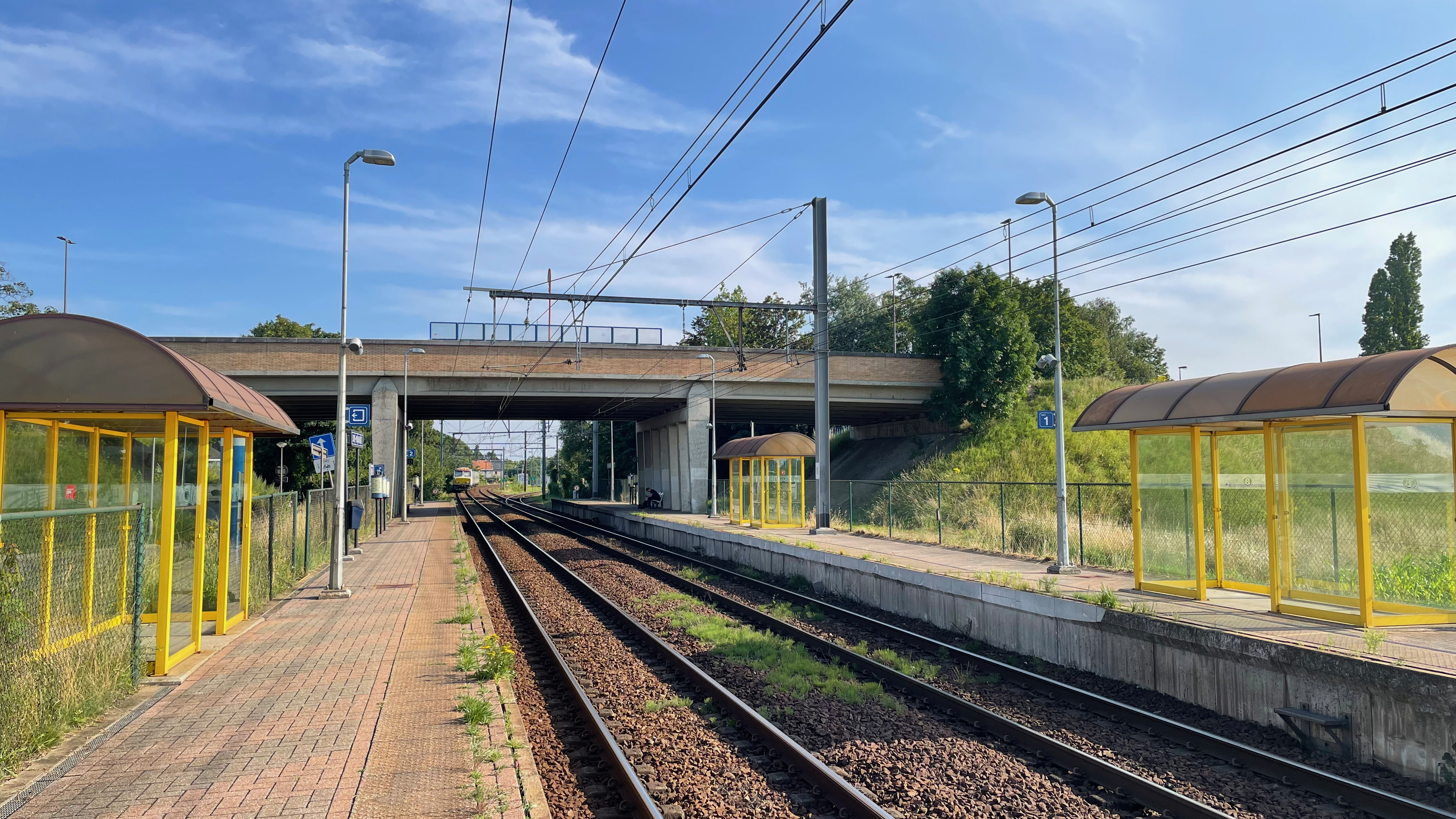
- Sint-Mariaburg railway station

General information
- Location: Ekeren, Antwerp, Belgium
- Coordinates: 51°17′29″N 4°26′05″E
- System: Railway Station
- Owner: National Railway Company of Belgium
- Line: Line 12
- Platforms: 2
- Tracks: 2

History
- Opened: 1934

Services
Preceding station	NMBS/SNCB	Following station
Kapellen towards Roosendaal	L 22	Ekeren towards Puurs
Location

Sint-Mariaburg is a railway station in the town of Ekeren, Antwerp, Belgium. The station opened in 1934 on the Antwerp–Lage Zwaluwe railway, known in Belgium as Line 12.

== Train services ==
The station is served by the following services:

- Local services (L-22) Roosendaal - Essen - Antwerp - Puurs (weekdays)
- Local services (L-22) Roosendaal - Essen - Antwerp (weekends)
