= Haacht railway station =

Railway station in Flemish Brabant, Belgium

Haacht
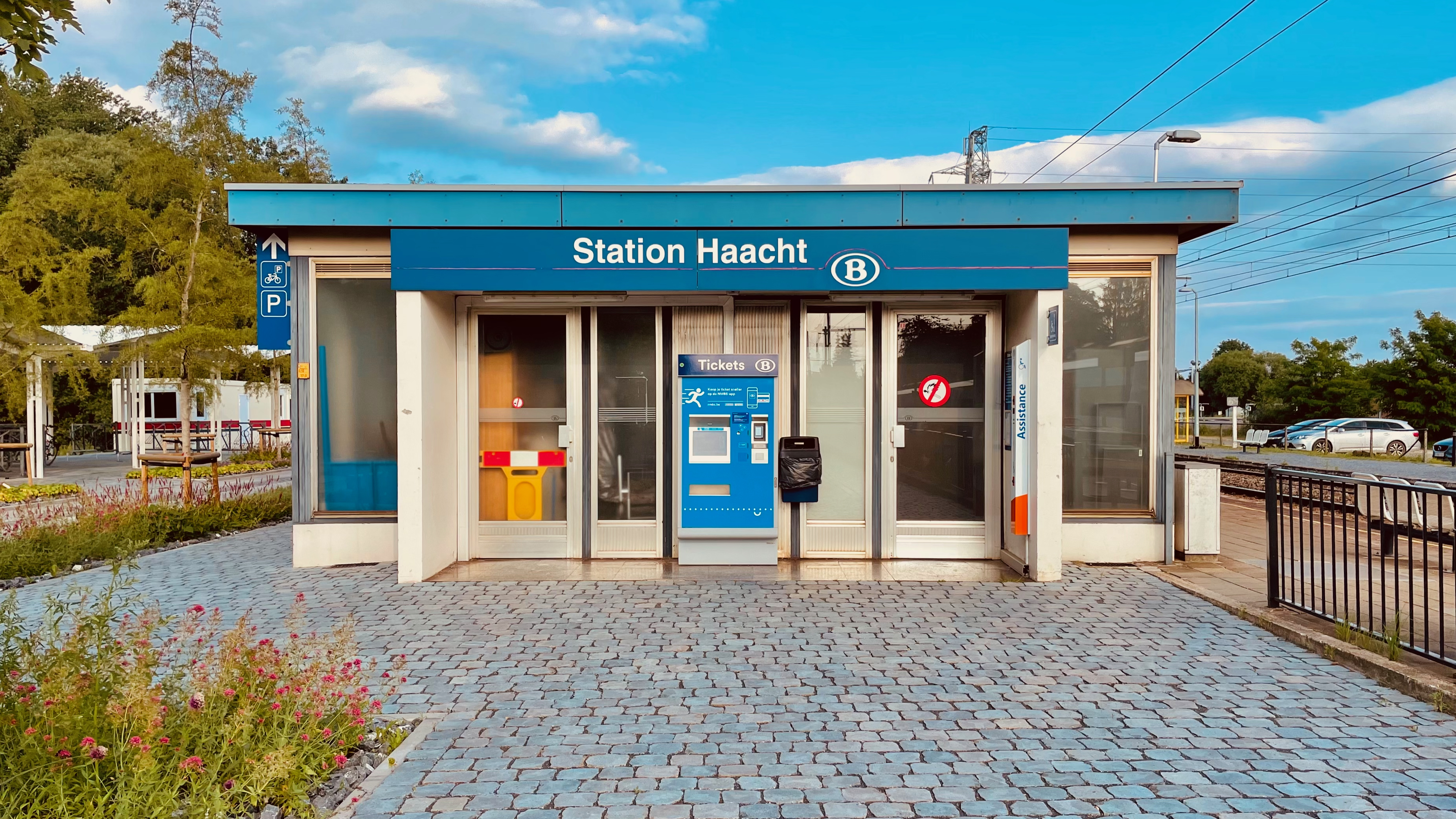
- Haacht railway station

General information
- Location: Haacht, Flemish Brabant, Belgium
- Coordinates: 50°57′58″N 4°36′49″E
- System: Railway Station
- Owner: National Railway Company of Belgium
- Line: 53
- Platforms: 2
- Tracks: 3

History
- Opened: 10 September 1837
Location

Haacht is a railway station in Haacht, Flemish Brabant, Belgium. The station opened in 1837 on the Line 53 (Mechelen - Leuven).

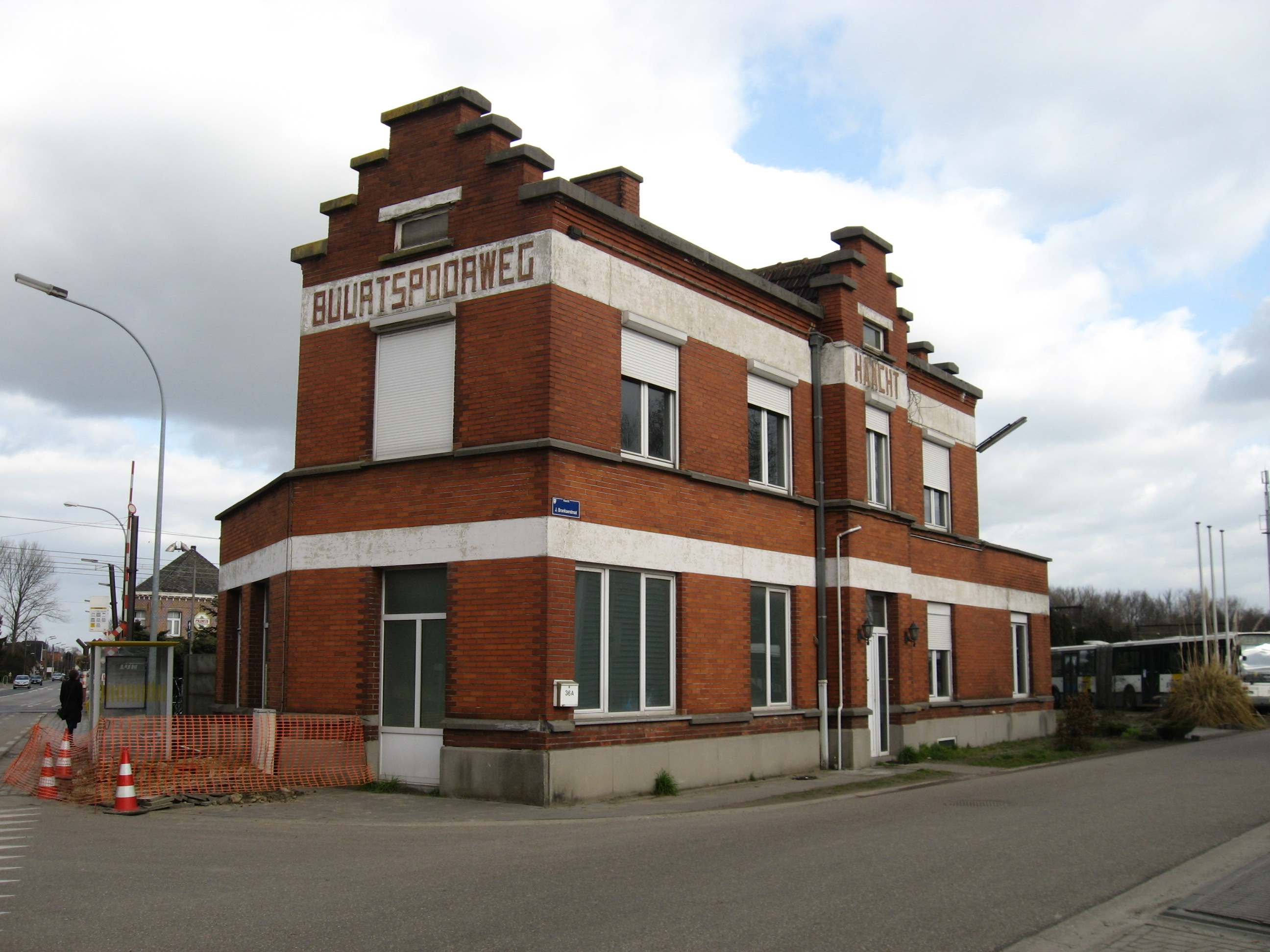
Old tram station building

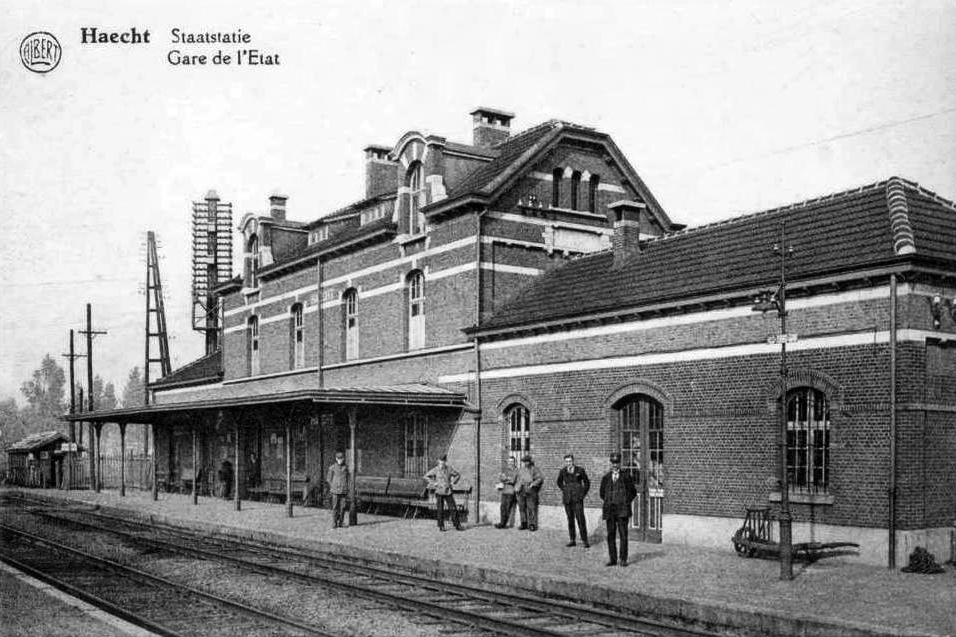
Old station in 1900

== Train services ==
The station is served by the following services:

- Intercity services (IC-21) Ghent - Dendermonde - Mechelen - Leuven (weekdays)
- Local services (L-20) Sint-Niklaas – Mechelen – Leuven (weekdays)
- Local services (L-20) Mechelen - Leuven (weekends)

Preceding station	NMBS/SNCB	Following station
Boortmeerbeek towards Gent-Sint-Pieters	IC 21	Wespelaar-Tildonk towards Leuven
Boortmeerbeek towards Sint-Niklaas	L 20 weekdays, except holidays	Wespelaar-Tildonk towards Leuven
Boortmeerbeek towards Mechelen	L 20 weekends	Wespelaar-Tildonk towards Leuven

== Bus services ==
These bus services depart from the bus stops outside the station. They are operated by De Lijn.

- 270 (Brussels - Haacht - Keerbergen) (an electrical tram service until 1953 and probably later)
- 284 (Mechelen - Boortmeerbeek - Haacht - Leuven)
- 470 (Brussels Noord - Haacht Express)
- 660 (Zaventem, Brussels Airport - Haacht - Bonheiden)
- 700 (Haacht - Kampenhout - Boortmeerbeek) Taxibus
