= Heide railway station, Belgium =

Railway station in Antwerp, Belgium

Heide
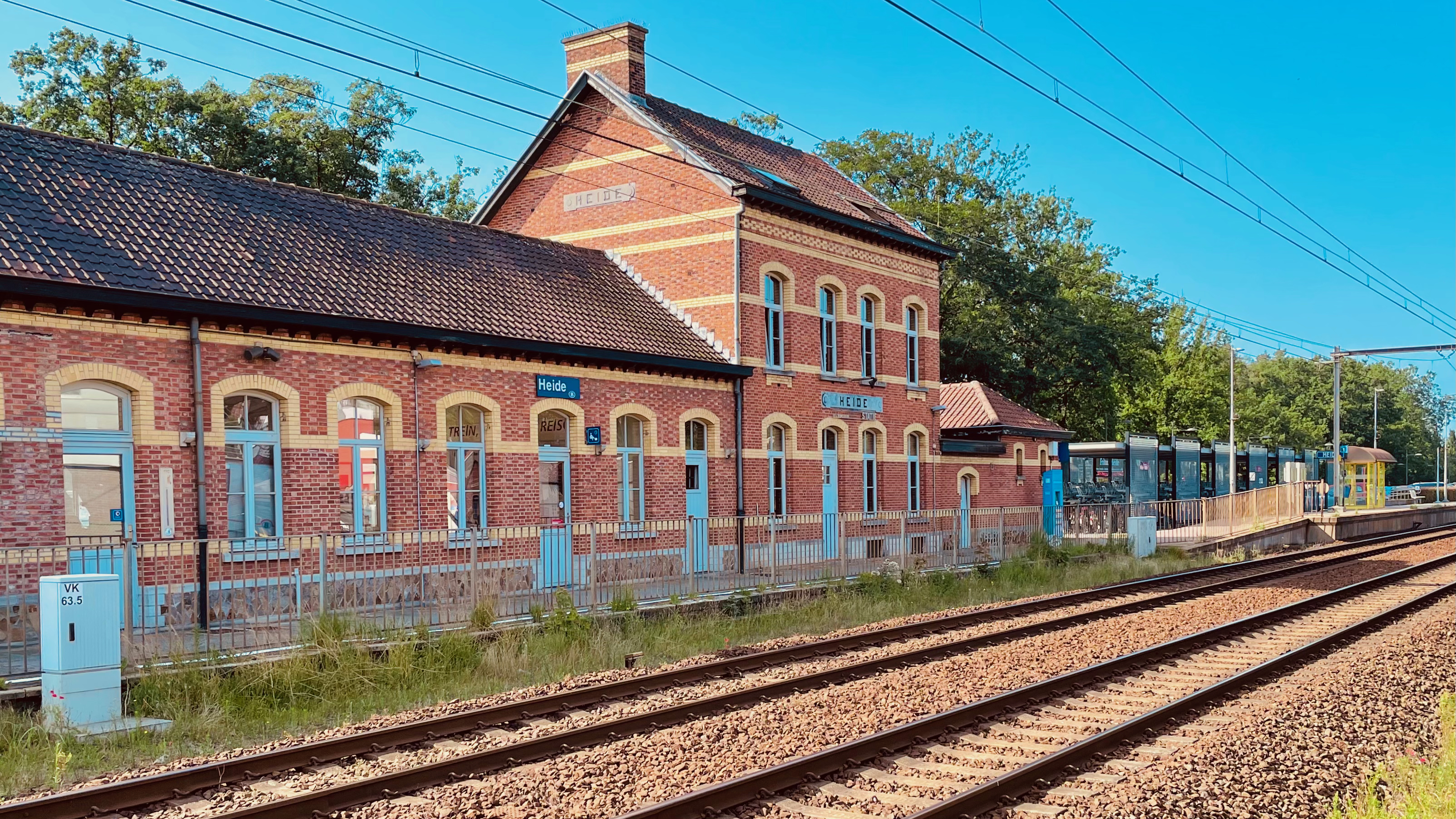
- Heide railway station

General information
- Location: Heide, Antwerp, Belgium
- Coordinates: 51°23′53″N 4°27′40″E
- System: Railway Station
- Owner: National Railway Company of Belgium
- Line: Line 12
- Platforms: 2
- Tracks: 2

History
- Opened: 3 January 1897

Services
Preceding station	NMBS/SNCB	Following station
Kalmthout towards Essen	IC 22	Kapellen towards Bruxelles-Midi / Brussel-Zuid
Kijkuit towards Roosendaal	L 22	Kapellen towards Puurs
Location

Heide is a railway station in the town of Heide, Antwerp, Belgium. The station opened on 3 January 1897 on the Antwerp–Lage Zwaluwe railway, known in Belgium as Line 12.

== Train services ==
The station is served by the following services:

- Intercity services (IC-22) Essen – Antwerp – Mechelen – Brussels (weekdays)
- Local services (L-22) Roosendaal – Essen – Antwerp – Puurs (weekdays)
- Local services (L-22) Roosendaal – Essen – Antwerp (weekends)
