= Heide railway station =

Heide railway station may refer to

- Heide (Germany) station
- Heide railway station, Belgium
