= Kalmthout railway station =

Railway station in Antwerp, Belgium

Kalmthout
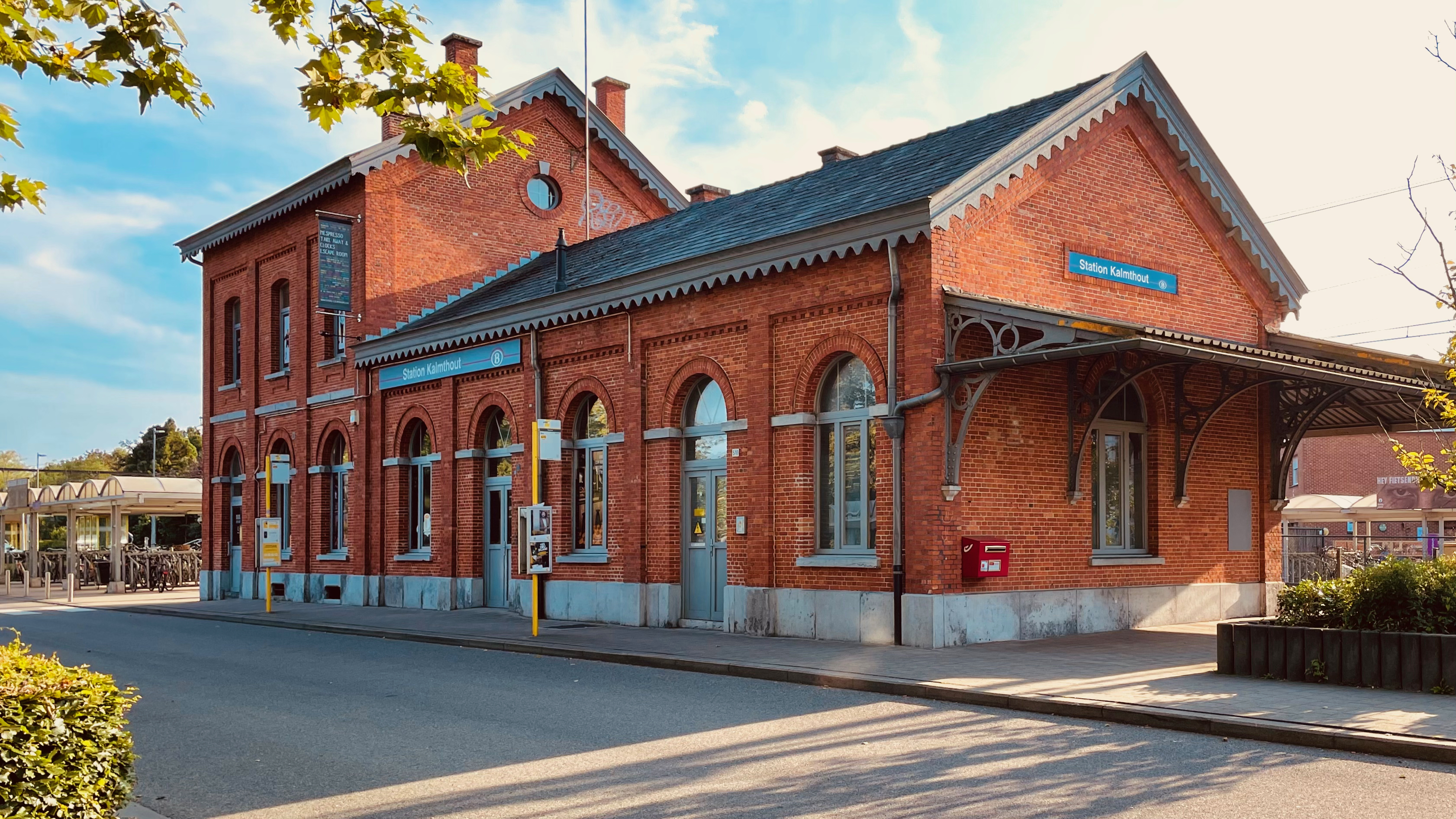
- Kalmthout railway station

General information
- Location: Kalmthout, Antwerp, Belgium
- Coordinates: 51°23′27″N 4°28′01″E
- System: Railway Station
- Owner: National Railway Company of Belgium
- Line: Line 12
- Platforms: 2
- Tracks: 2

History
- Opened: 26 June 1854

Services
Preceding station	NMBS/SNCB	Following station
Essen Terminus	IC 22	Heide towards Bruxelles-Midi / Brussel-Zuid
Wildert towards Roosendaal	L 22	Kijkuit towards Puurs
Location

Kalmthout is a railway station in the town of Kalmthout, Antwerp, Belgium. The station opened on 26 June 1854 on the Antwerp–Lage Zwaluwe railway, known in Belgium as Line 12.

== Train services ==
The station is served by the following services:

- Intercity services (IC-22) Essen - Antwerp - Mechelen - Brussels (weekdays)
- Local services (L-22) Roosendaal - Essen - Antwerp - Puurs (weekdays)
- Local services (L-22) Roosendaal - Essen - Antwerp (weekends)
