= Wildert railway station =

Railway station in Antwerp, Belgium

Wildert
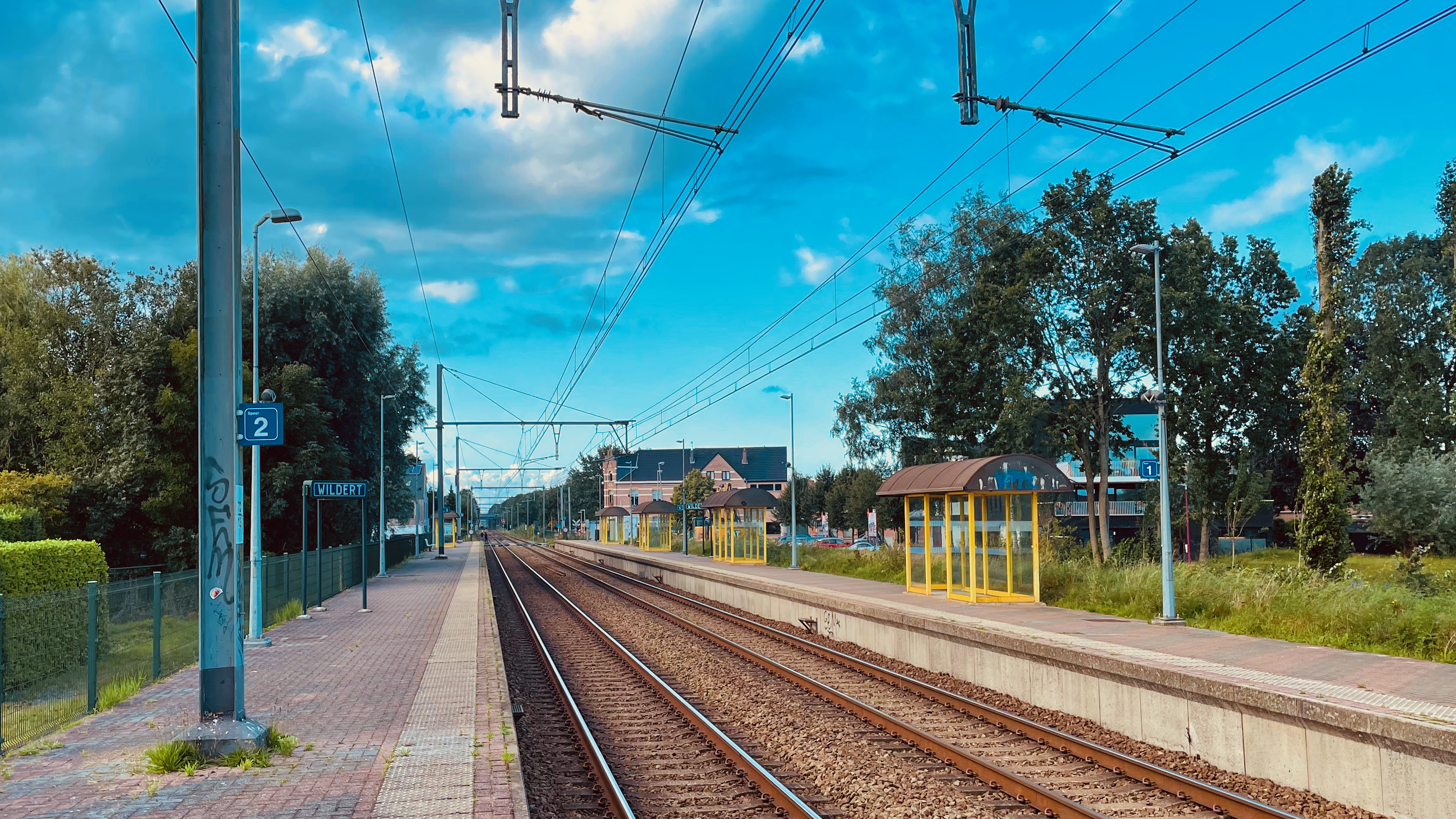
- Wildert railway station

General information
- Location: Wildert, Antwerp, Belgium
- Coordinates: 51°27′45″N 4°27′04″E
- System: Railway Station
- Owner: National Railway Company of Belgium
- Line: Line 12
- Platforms: 2
- Tracks: 2

History
- Opened: 13 November 1881

Services
Preceding station	NMBS/SNCB	Following station
Essen towards Roosendaal	L 22	Kalmthout towards Puurs
Location

Wildert is a railway station in the village of Wildert, Essen, Antwerp, Belgium. The station opened on 13 November 1881 on the Antwerp–Lage Zwaluwe railway, known in Belgium as Line 12.

== Train services ==
The station is served by the following services:

- Local services (L-22) Roosendaal - Essen - Antwerp - Puurs (weekdays)
- Local services (L-22) Roosendaal - Essen - Antwerp (weekends)
