= Heide, Kalmthout =

Heide
- Village
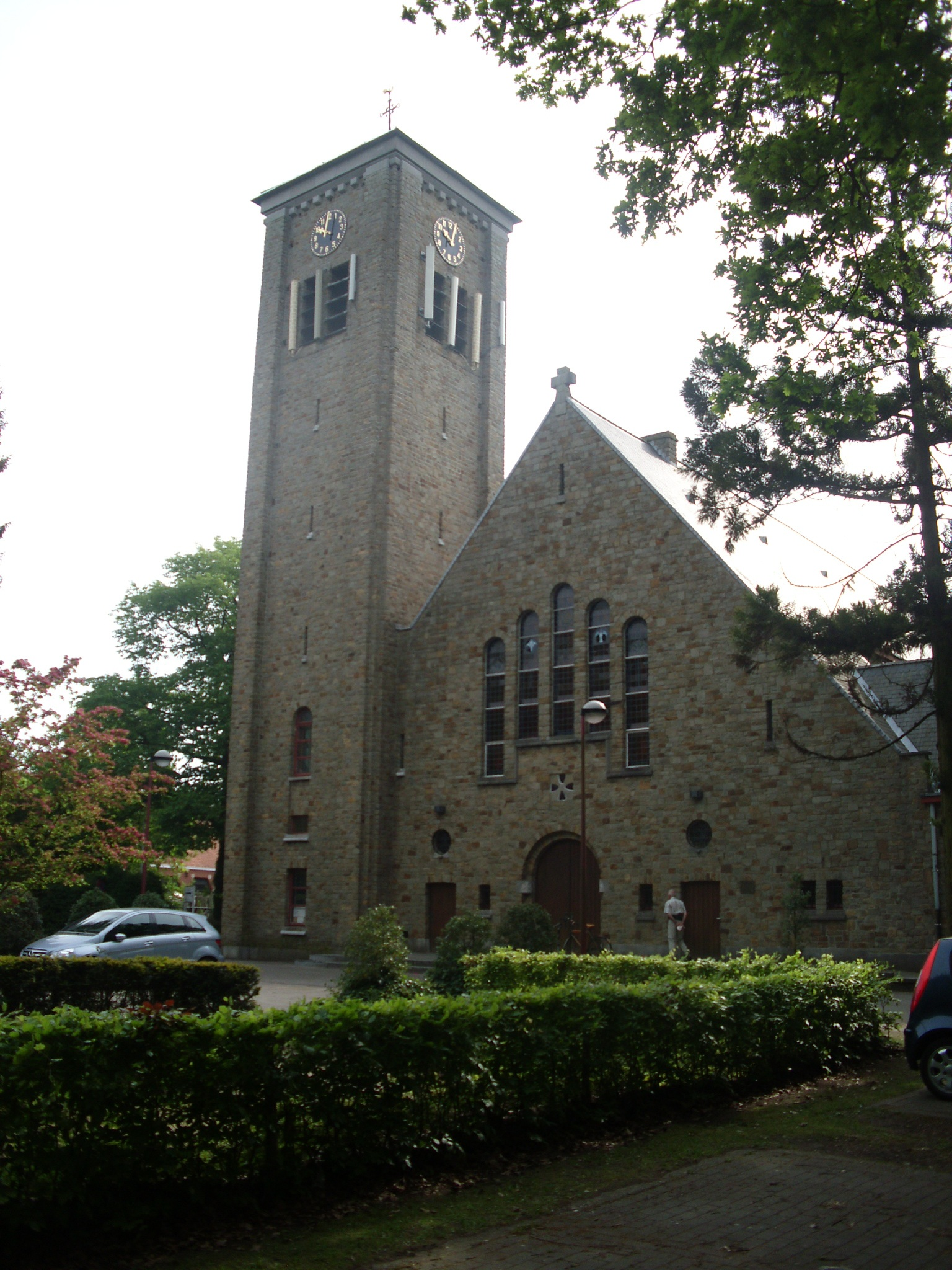
- The Saint Joseph church in Heide

- Location within Belgium
- Coordinates: 51°23′N 4°28′E
- Country: Belgium
- Region: Flemish Region
- Community: Flemish Community
- Province: Antwerp
- Arrondissement: Antwerp
- Municipality: Kalmthout

Area
  - Total: 10.12 km^{2} (3.91 sq mi)
- Elevation: 17 m (56 ft)

Population (2021)
  - Total: 5,219
  - Density: 515.7/km^{2} (1,336/sq mi)
- Postal code: 2920
- Area code: 03

Heide is a village in the municipality of Kalmthout, Belgium. The village is situated south of Kalmthout on railway line 12, linking Antwerp with Roosendaal in the Netherlands. The village also lies on the border of the Kalmthout Heath nature reserve. Two national roads, the N111 and N122, run on either side of the village. Railway connections are available from the Heide railway station situated in the town centre.

== History ==
A monument situated in front of the station building features two life-sized statues depicting the first encounter between Canadian Lt-Col. Denis Whitaker and Belgian resistance fighter Eugène Colson after the liberation of the village in 1944 by the Canadian Royal Hamilton Light Infantry.
