= Libramont railway station =

Railway station in Luxembourg, Belgium

Libramont
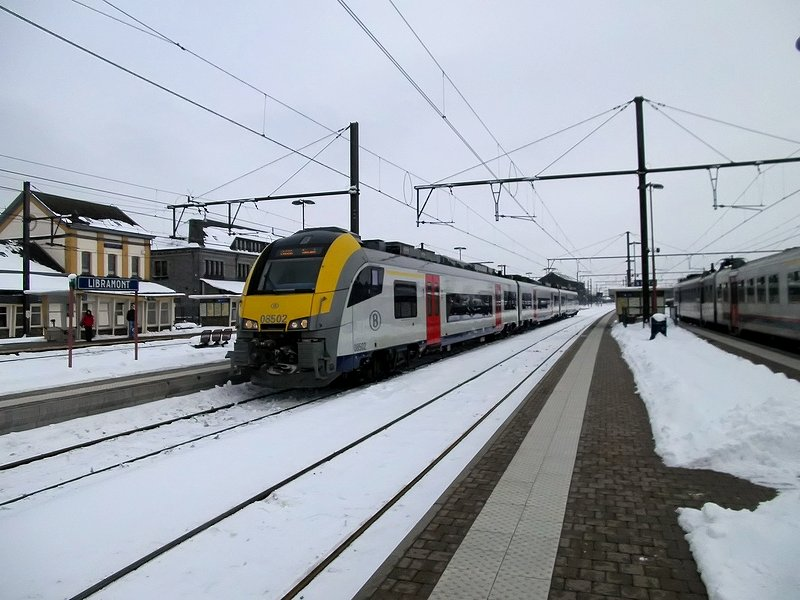
- Libramont railway station

General information
- Location: Place de la Gare, 6800 Libramont-Chevigny; Belgium
- Coordinates: 49°55′12″N 5°22′45″E
- System: Railway Station
- Owner: SNCB/NMBS
- Operator: SNCB/NMBS
- Lines: 162, 163, 165
- Platforms: 3
- Tracks: 6

Other information
- Station code: LRB

History
- Opened: 8 November 1858; 167 years ago
- Closed: 2000 (goods)

Passengers
- 2009: 762,268
Location
- Location within Belgium Location within Europe

Libramont railway station (French: Gare de Libramont, Dutch: Station Libramont) (Note: Officially Libramont) is a railway station in Libramont-Chevigny, Luxembourg, Belgium. It opened on 8 November 1858 on railway lines 162, 163 and 165. The train services are operated by the National Railway Company of Belgium (SNCB/NMBS).

As of July 2012, the electric-powered MS08 replaced the MW41 DMU's.

== Train services ==
The station is served by the following services:

- Intercity services (IC-16) Brussels - Namur - Arlon - Luxembourg
- Local services (L-10) Ciney - Marloie - Libramont
- Local services (L-11) Namur - Dinant - Bertrix - Libramont
- Local services (L-12) Libramont - Arlon - Luxembourg
- Local services (L-13) Libramont - Virton - Athus - Arlon (weekdays)
- Local services (L-13) Libramont - Virton (weekends)

Preceding station	NMBS/SNCB	Following station
Jemelle towards Bruxelles-Midi / Brussel-Zuid	IC 16	Marbehan towards Luxembourg
Poix-Saint-Hubert towards Ciney	L 10	Terminus
Bertrix towards Namur	L 11	Terminus
Terminus	L 12	Neufchâteau towards Luxembourg
Terminus	L 13 weekdays, except holidays	Bertrix towards Arlon
Terminus	L 13 weekends	Bertrix towards Virton

== See also ==
- List of railway stations in Belgium
- Rail transport in Belgium
