= Ans railway station =

Railway station in Liège, Belgium

Ans
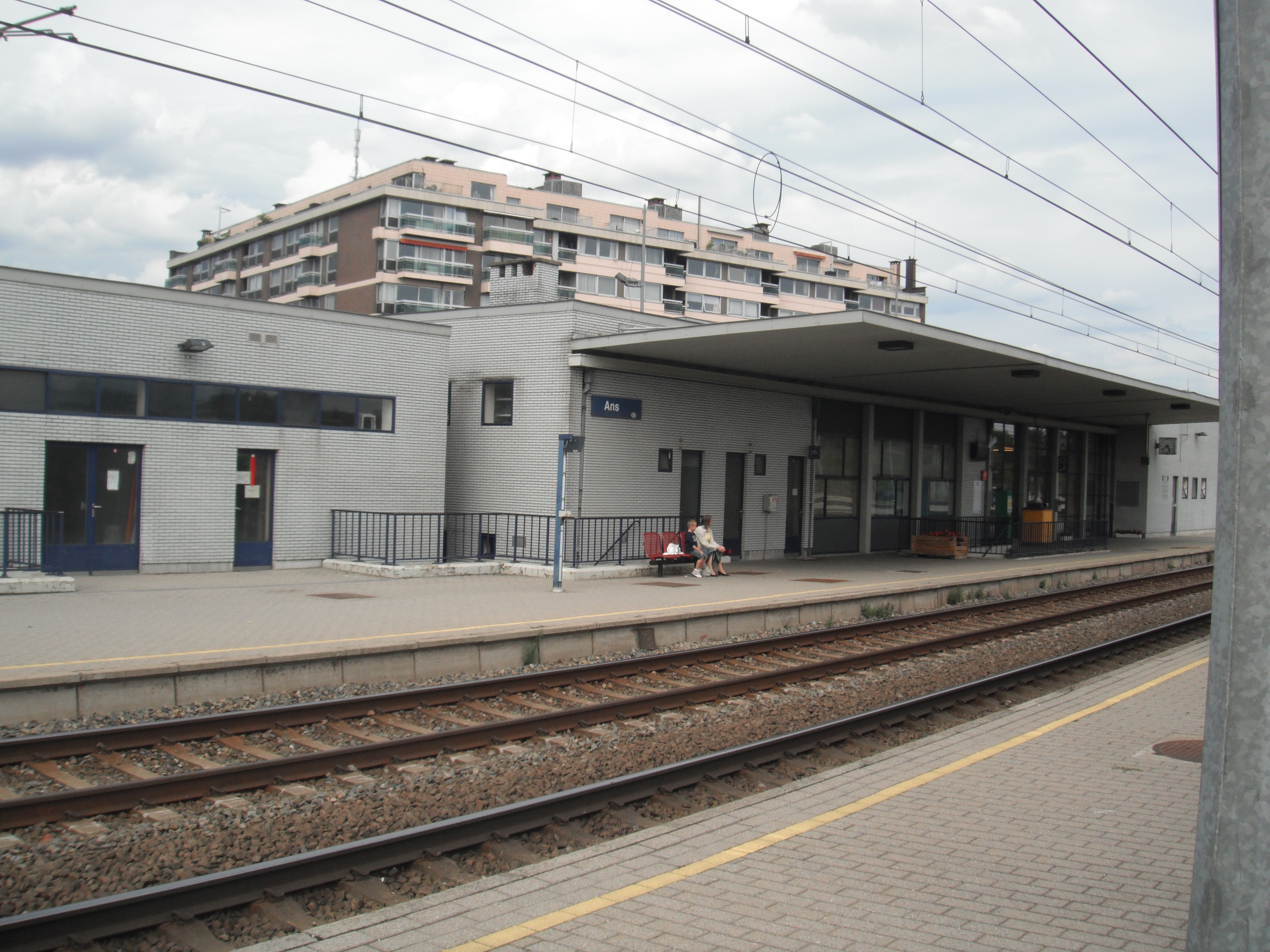
- Ans railway station

General information
- Location: Ans, Liège; Belgium
- Coordinates: 50.6613°N 5.5098°E
- System: Railway Station
- Owner: SNCB/NMBS
- Operator: SNCB/NMBS
- Line: 36
- Platforms: 5
- Tracks: 6

Services
Preceding station	NMBS/SNCB	Following station
Waremme towards Quiévrain	IC 14 weekdays	Liège-Guillemins Terminus
Bierset-Awans towards Waremme	L 21 weekdays	Liège-Guillemins Terminus
Bierset-Awans towards Landen	L 21 weekends	Liège-Guillemins Terminus
Location
- Location within Belgium Location within Europe

Ans railway station (French: Gare d'Ans; Dutch: Station Ans) (Note: Officially Ans) is a railway station in Ans, Liège, Belgium. It is served by railway line 36. The train services are operated by the National Railway Company of Belgium (SNCB/NMBS).

== Facilities ==
The station has five platforms. Platforms 1 and 2 have speed limits of 160 km/h (100 mph) and are directly connected to High Speed Line 2, to allow Thalys and Intercity-Express (ICE) trains to pass.

== Train services ==
The station is served by the following services:

- Intercity services (IC-14) Quiévrain - Mons - Braine-le-Comte - Brussels - Leuven - Liege (weekdays)
- Local services (L-21) Waremme - Liege (weekdays)
- Local services (L-21) Landen - Waremme - Liege (weekends)

== Gallery ==
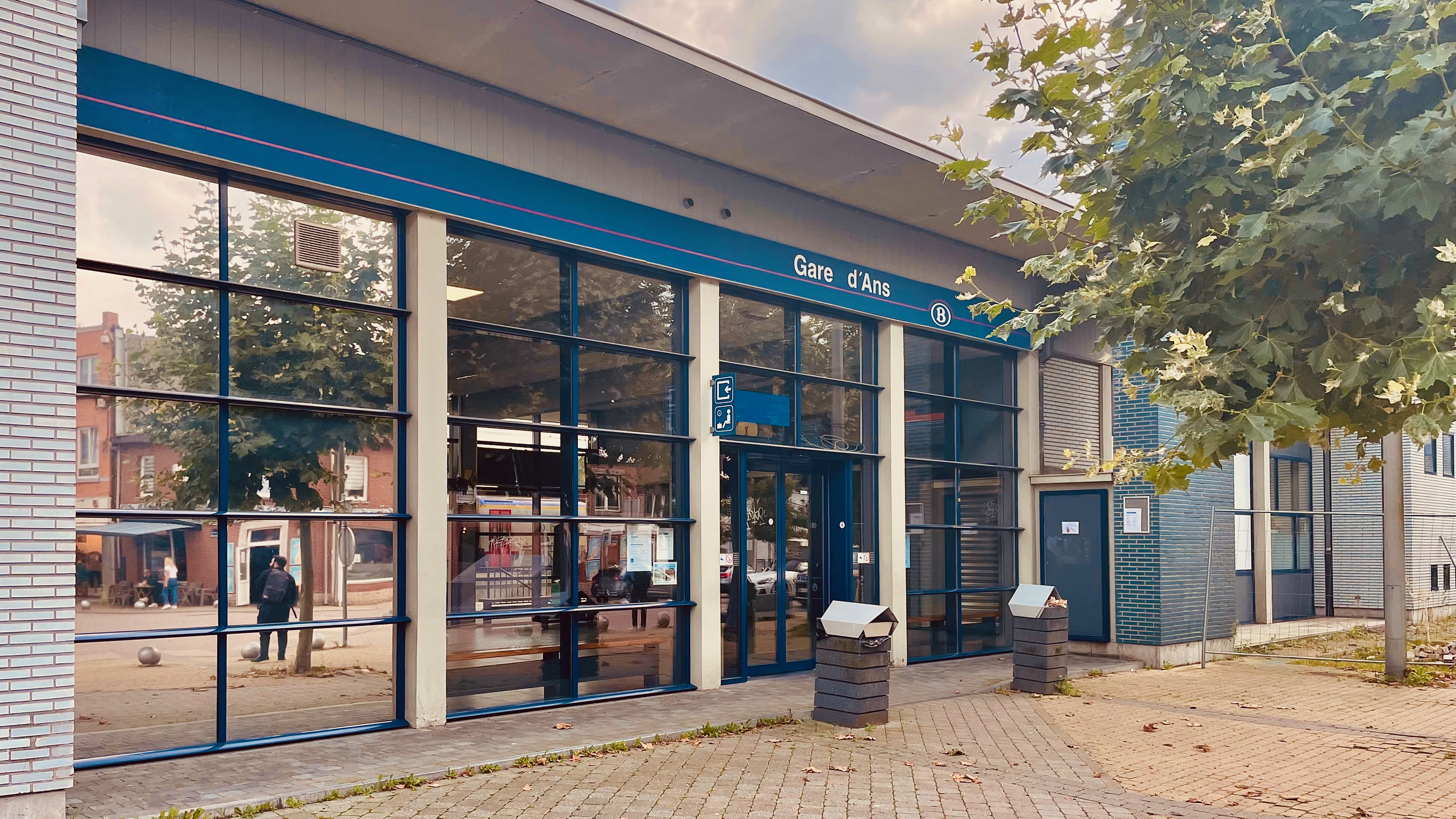
Frontal view

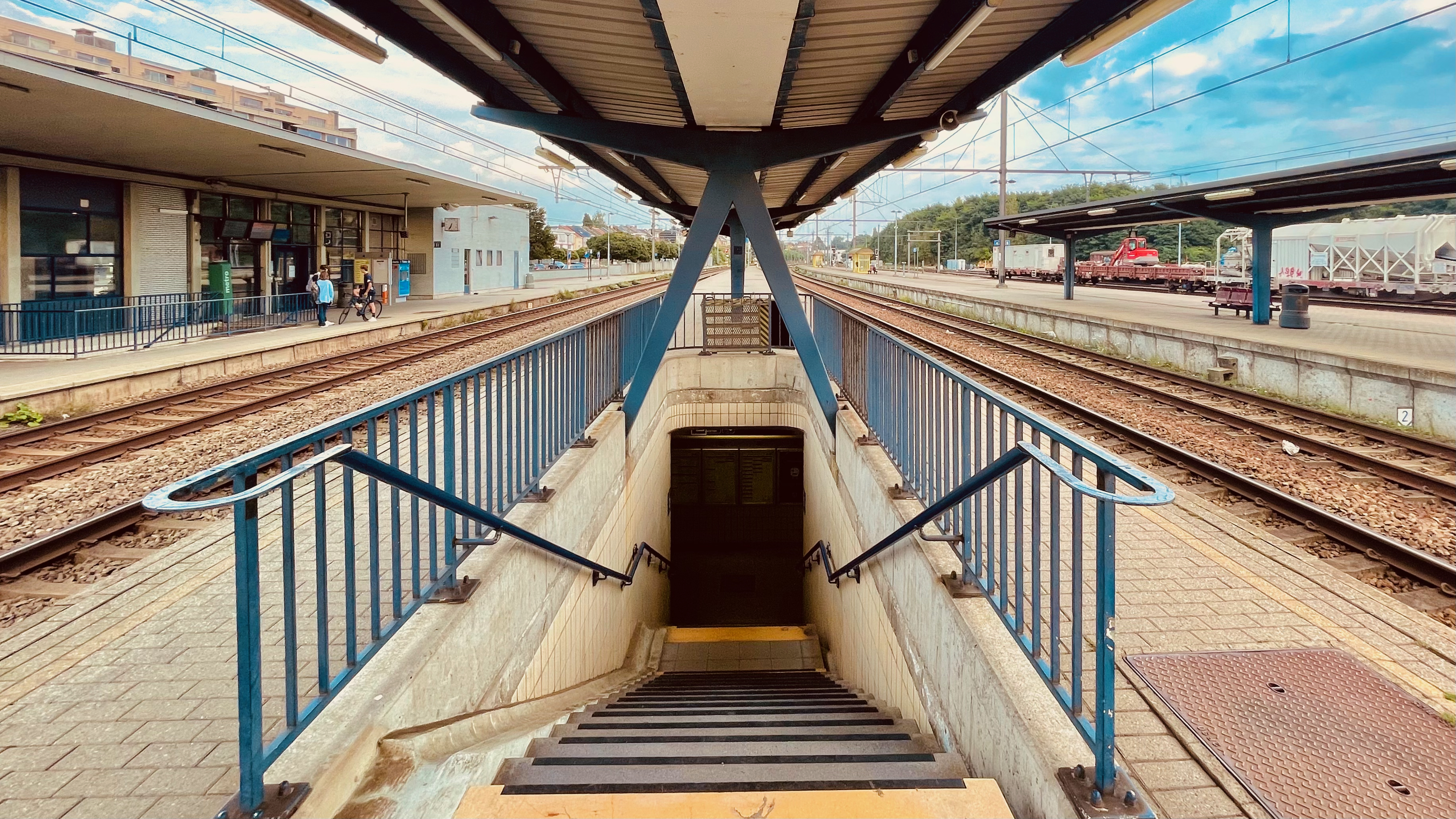
View of the platforms

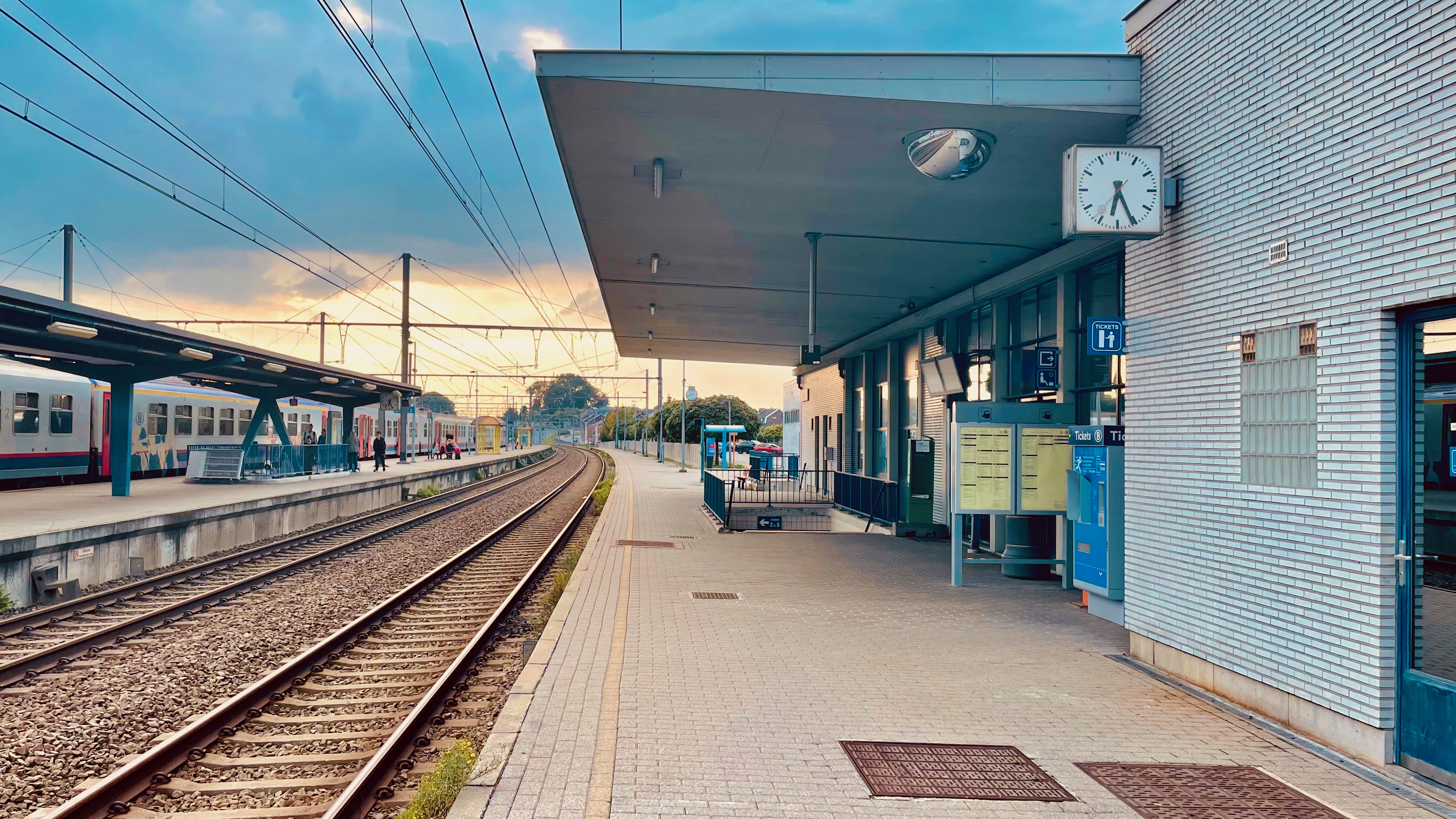
View of the platforms and tracks

== See also ==
- List of railway stations in Belgium
- Rail transport in Belgium
