= Kijkuit railway station =

Railway station in Antwerp, Belgium

Kijkuit
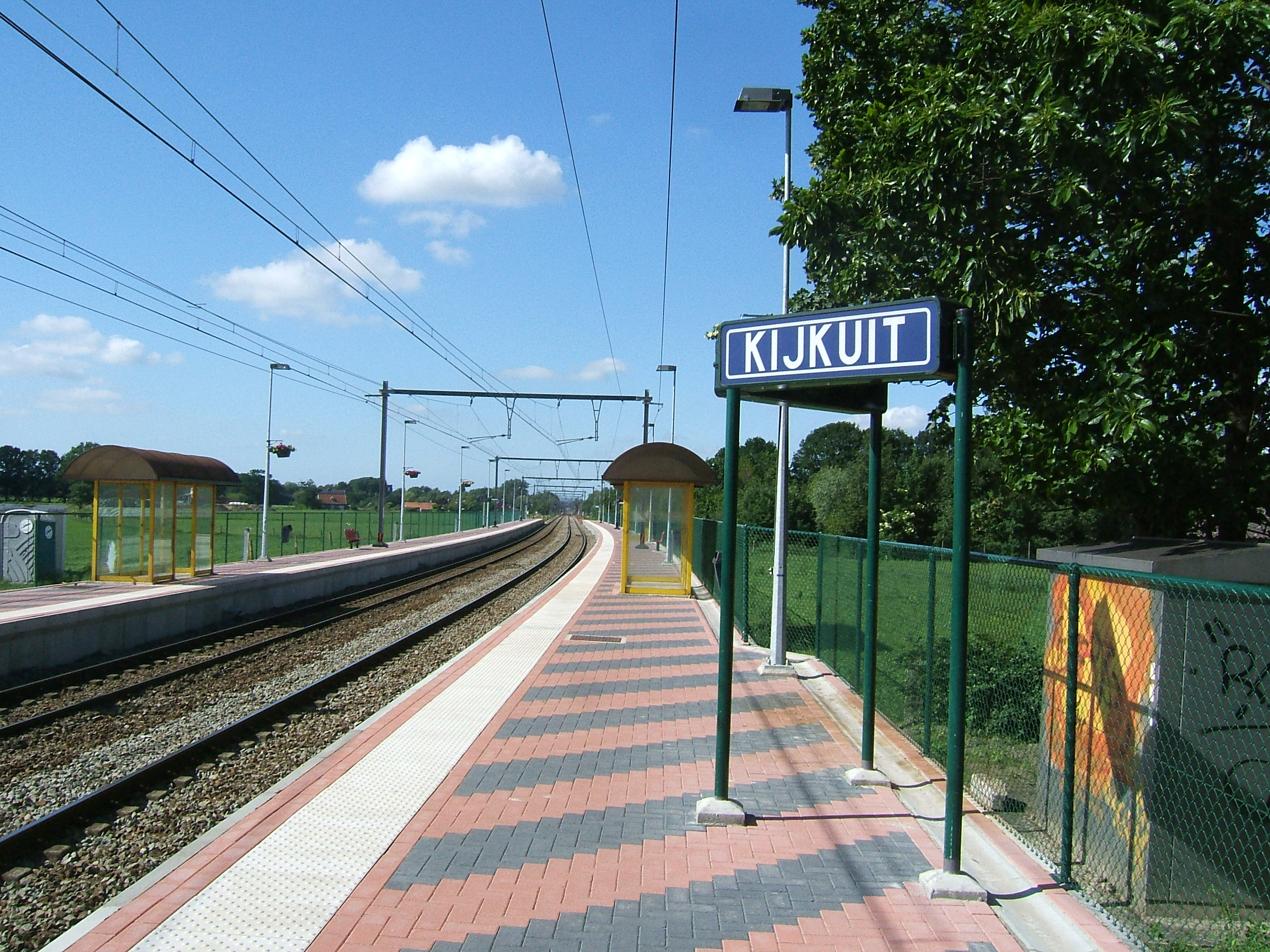

General information
- Location: Kalmthout, Antwerp, Belgium
- Coordinates: 51°22′44″N 4°28′02″E
- System: Railway Station
- Owner: National Railway Company of Belgium
- Line: Line 12
- Platforms: 2
- Tracks: 2

History
- Opened: 15 May 1933
Location

Kijkuit is a railway station in the town of Kalmthout, Antwerp, Belgium. The station opened on 15 May 1933 on the Antwerp–Lage Zwaluwe railway, known in Belgium as Line 12.

== Train services ==
The station is served by the following services:

- Local services (L-22) Roosendaal - Essen - Antwerp - Puurs (weekdays)
- Local services (L-22) Roosendaal - Essen - Antwerp (weekends)

Preceding station	NMBS/SNCB	Following station
Kalmthout towards Roosendaal	L 22	Heide towards Puurs
