= Beveren railway station =

Railway station in East Flanders, Belgium

Beveren
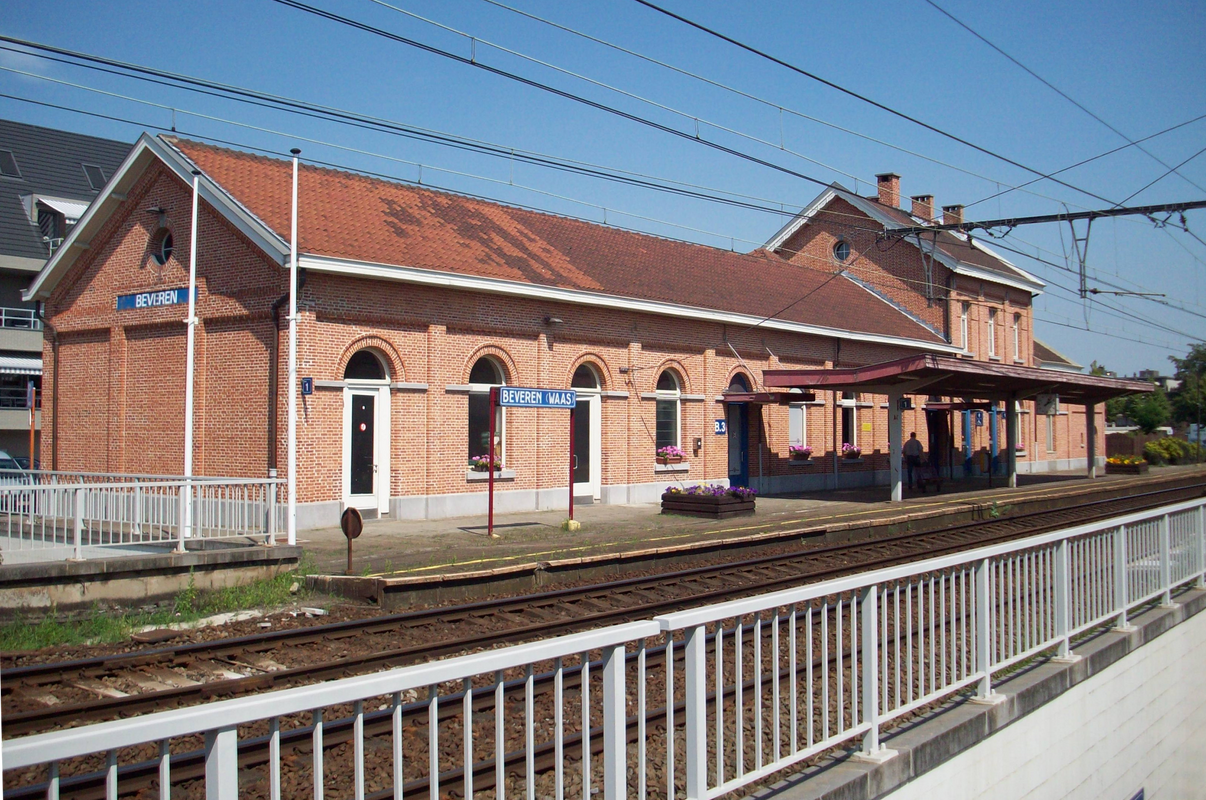
- Beveren railway station

General information
- Location: Beveren, East Flanders; Belgium
- Coordinates: 51°12′30″N 4°15′36″E
- System: Railway Station
- Owner: Infrabel
- Operator: National Railway Company of Belgium
- Line: 59
- Platforms: 2

Other information
- Station code: FBR

History
- Opened: 3 November 1844; 181 years ago

Passengers
- 2014: 961 per day
Location

Beveren is a railway station in the town of Beveren, East Flanders, Belgium. The station opened on 3 November 1844 and is located on line 59. The train services are operated by National Railway Company of Belgium (NMBS).

== Train services ==
The station is served by the following services:

- Intercity services (IC-02) Ostend - Bruges - Ghent - Sint-Niklaas - Antwerpen

| Preceding station | NMBS/SNCB | Following station |
|---|---|---|
| Sint-Niklaas towards Oostende | IC 02 | Antwerpen-Zuid towards Antwerpen-Centraal |

== See also ==
- List of railway stations in Belgium
