= Sint-Niklaas railway station =

Railway station in East Flanders, Belgium

Sint-Niklaas
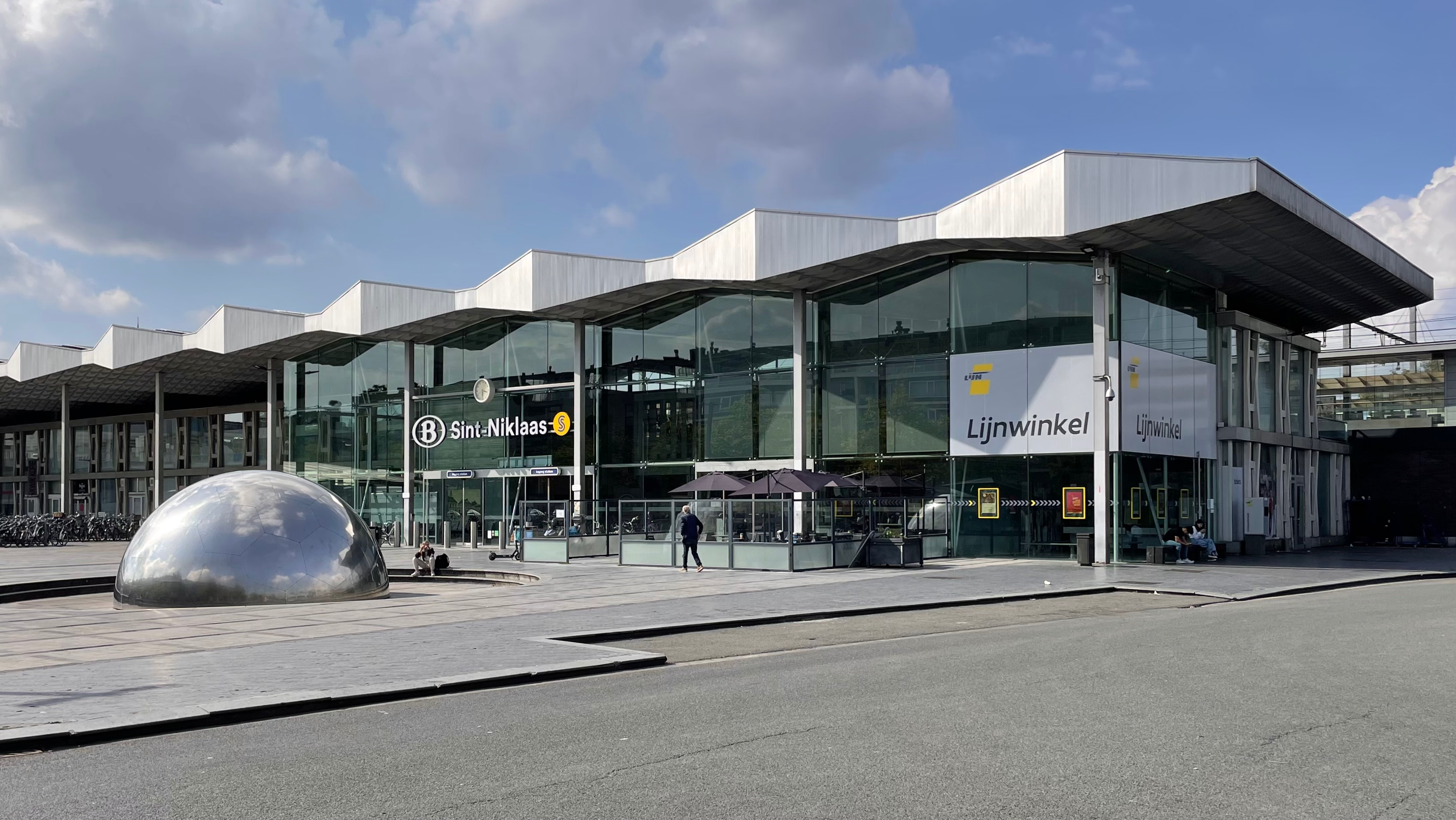
- Sint-Niklaas railway station

General information
- Location: Leopold II-laan, 9100 Sint-Niklaas; Belgium
- Coordinates: 51°10′19″N 4°8′39″E
- System: Railway Station
- Owner: NMBS/SNCB
- Operator: NMBS/SNCB
- Lines: 59, 54
- Platforms: 3 centre platforms
- Tracks: 6

Other information
- Station code: FSN

History
- Opened: 3 November 1844; 181 years ago
- Rebuilt: 1972; 54 years ago
- Electrified: 1970

Passengers
- 2009: 1.9 million
Location
- Location within Belgium Location within Europe

Sint-Niklaas railway station (Dutch: Station Sint-Niklaas; French: Gare de Saint-Nicolas) (Note: Officially Sint-Niklaas (Dutch: Sint-Niklaas; French: Saint-Nicolas)) is a railway station in Sint-Niklaas, East Flanders, Belgium. The original station opened on 3 November 1844 on railway line 59. The current station was built in 1972 by the architects Ludwig Van Wilder and Omer De Grootte. The train services are operated by the National Railway Company of Belgium (NMBS/SNCB).

== Train services ==
The following services currently serve the station:

- Intercity services (IC-02) Ostend - Bruges - Ghent - Sint-Niklaas - Antwerpen
- Intercity services (IC-04) Lille/Poperinge - Kortrijk - Ghent - Sint-Niklaas - Antwerp
- Intercity services (IC-26) Kortrijk - Tournai - Halle - Brussels - Dendermonde - Lokeren - Sint Niklaas (weekdays)
- Intercity services (IC-28) Ghent - Sint-Niklaas - Antwerp (weekdays)
- Local services (L-20) Sint-Niklaas – Mechelen – Leuven (weekdays)
- Local services (L-27) Sint-Niklaas - Mechelen (weekends)
- Local services (L-30) Lokeren - Sint-Niklaas - Antwerp

Preceding station	NMBS/SNCB	Following station
Lokeren towards Oostende	IC 02	Beveren towards Antwerpen-Centraal
Lokeren towards Lille-Flandres or Poperinge	IC 04	Antwerpen-Berchem towards Antwerpen-Centraal
Belsele towards Kortrijk	IC 26 weekdays	Terminus
Lokeren towards De Panne	IC 28 weekdays	Antwerpen-Zuid towards Antwerpen-Centraal
Terminus	L 20 weekdays	Temse towards Leuven
Terminus	L 27 weekends	Temse towards Mechelen
Belsele towards Lokeren	L 30	Nieuwkerken-Waas towards Antwerpen-Centraal

== Gallery ==
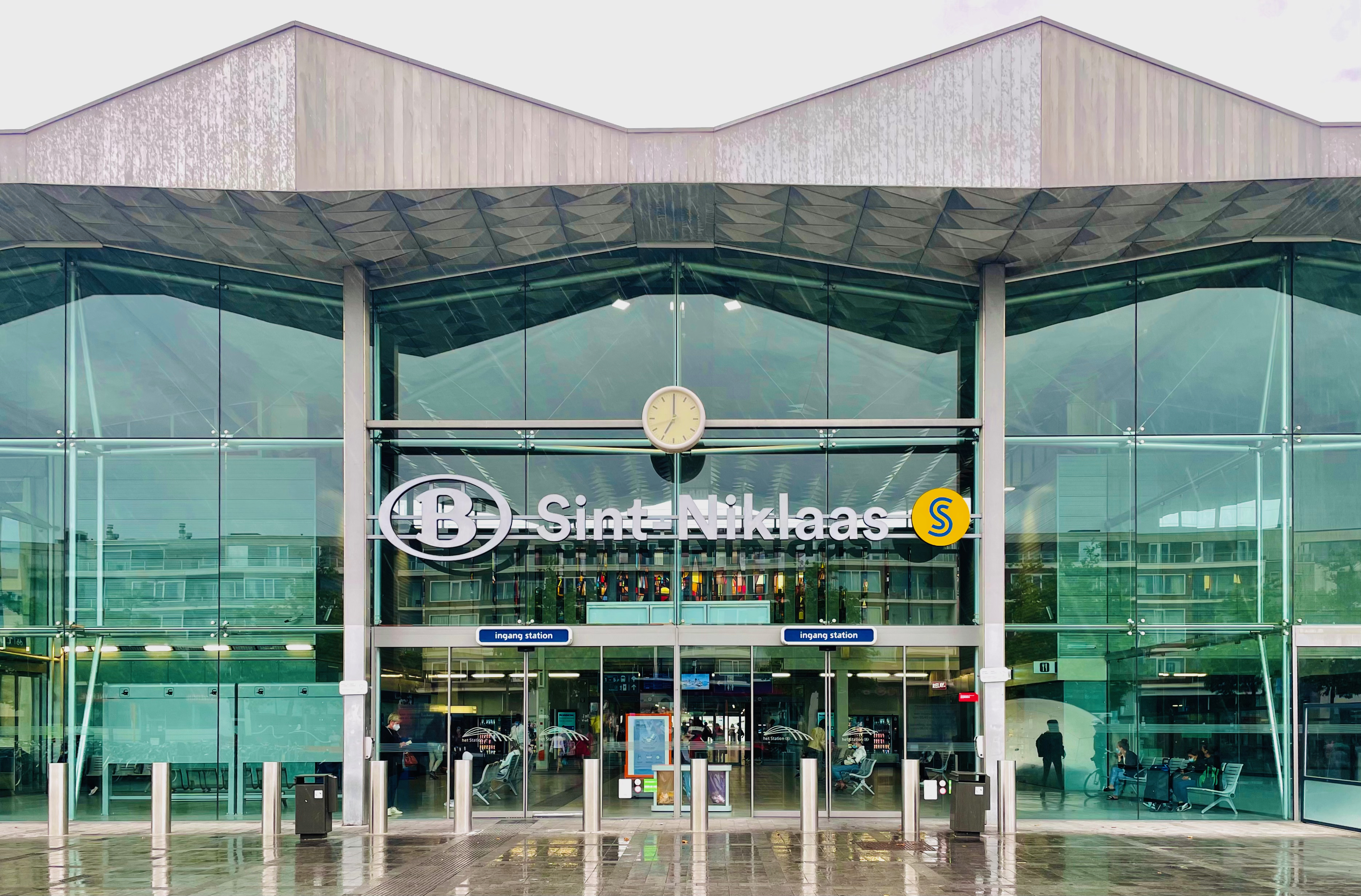
Frontal view

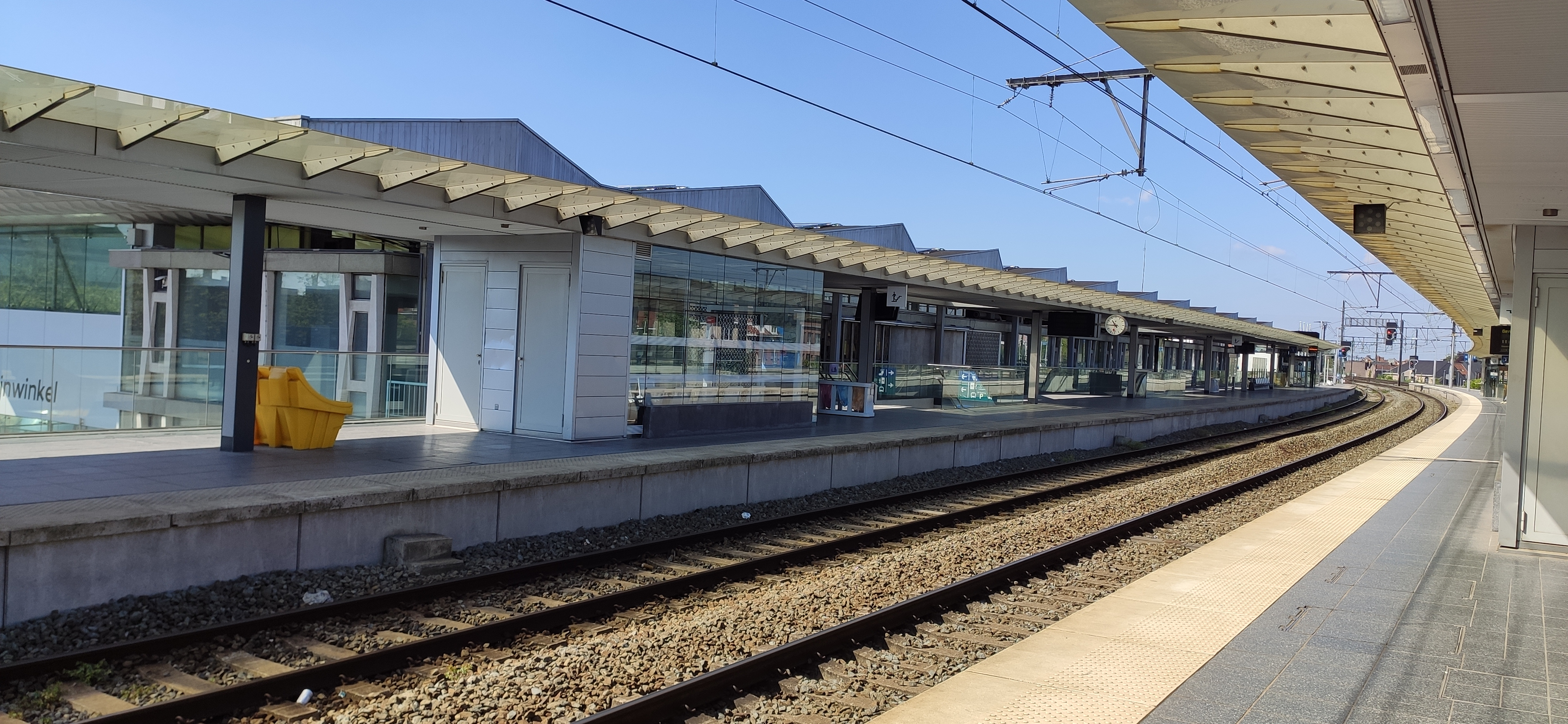
View of the platforms and tracks

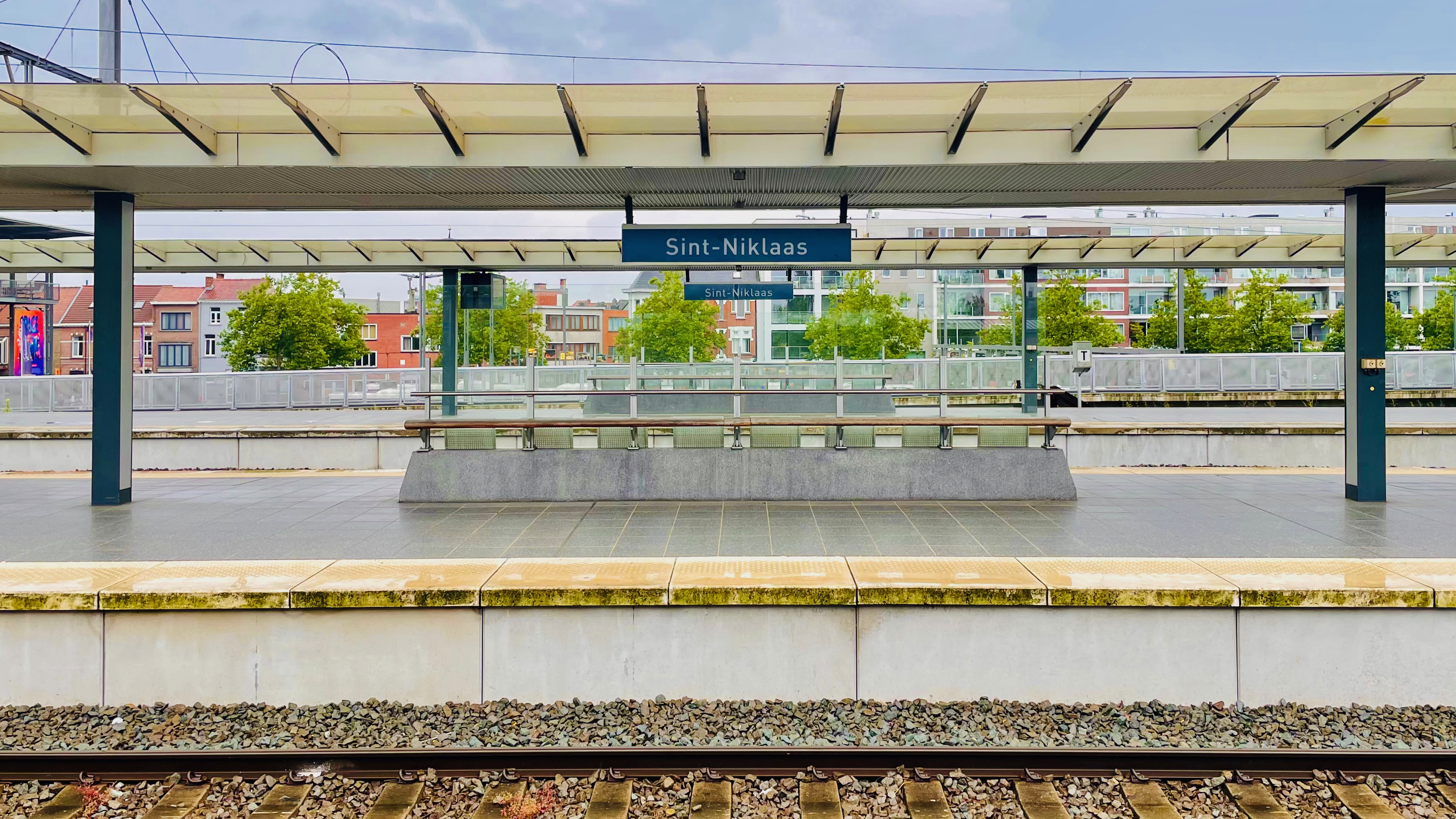
Place name sign on a platform

== See also ==
- List of railway stations in Belgium
- Rail transport in Belgium
