= Antwerpen-Noorderdokken railway station =

Railway station in Antwerp, Belgium

Antwerpen-Noorderdokken
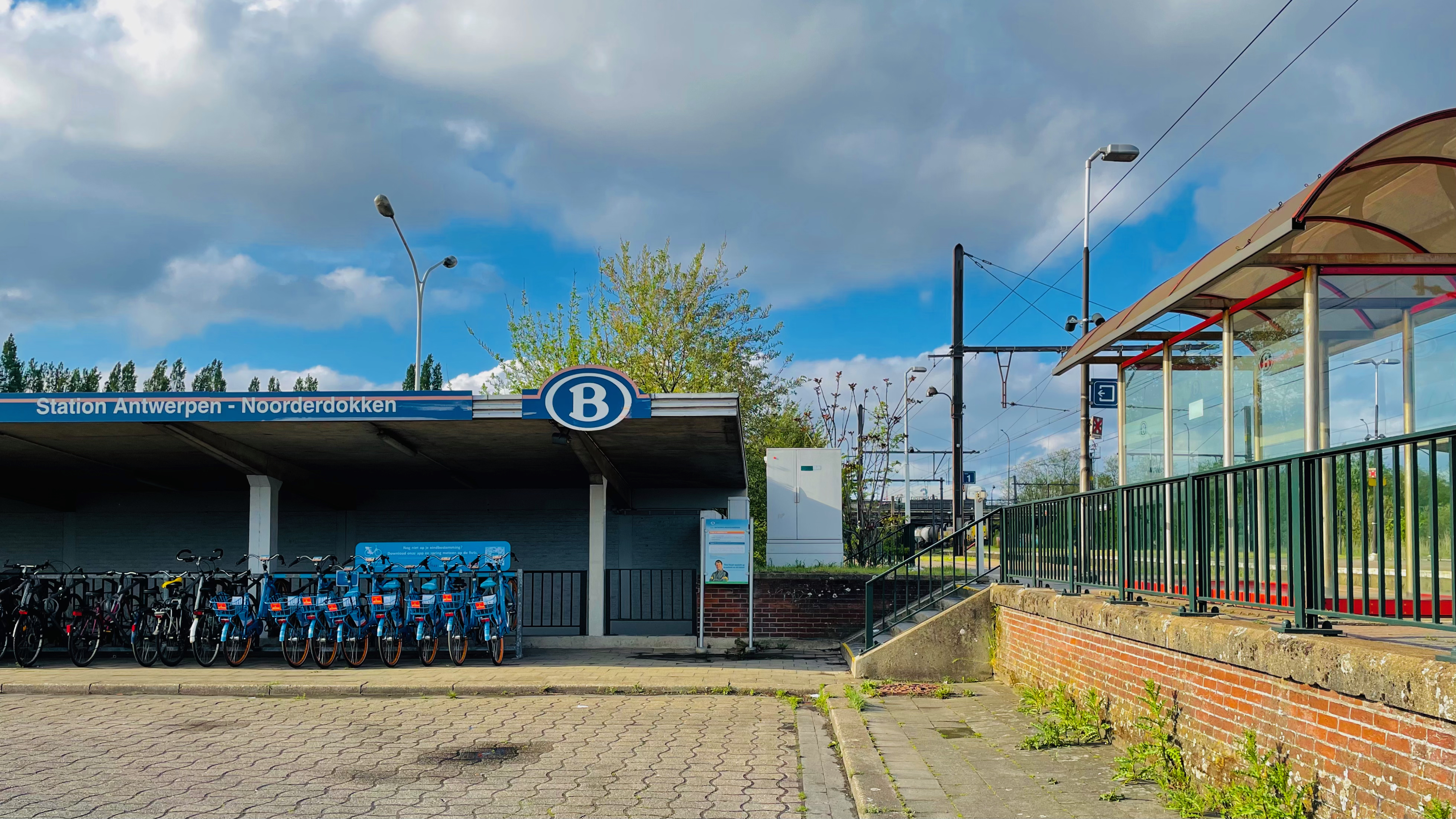
- Antwerpen-Noorderdokken railway station

General information
- Location: Antwerp, Antwerp, Belgium
- Coordinates: 51°15′41″N 4°25′40″E
- System: Railway Station
- Owner: National Railway Company of Belgium
- Lines: Line 12, Line 27A
- Platforms: 4
- Tracks: 4

History
- Opened: 26 May 1974
Location

Antwerp-Noorderdokken (English: Antwerp Northern Docks) is a railway station in the city of Antwerp, Antwerp, Belgium. The station opened on 26 May 1974 on the Antwerp–Lage Zwaluwe railway, known in Belgium as Line 12 and also Line 27A, a freight line to the port of Antwerp.

== Train services ==
The station is served by the following services:

- Local services (L-22) Roosendaal - Essen - Antwerp - Puurs (weekdays)
- Local services (L-22) Roosendaal - Essen - Antwerp (weekends)

Preceding station	NMBS/SNCB	Following station
Ekeren towards Roosendaal	L 22	Antwerpen-Luchtbal towards Puurs

== Bus services ==
Bus lines 760 and 761 serve the station, these are operated by De Lijn.
