= Sy railway station =

Railway station in Liège, Belgium

Sy
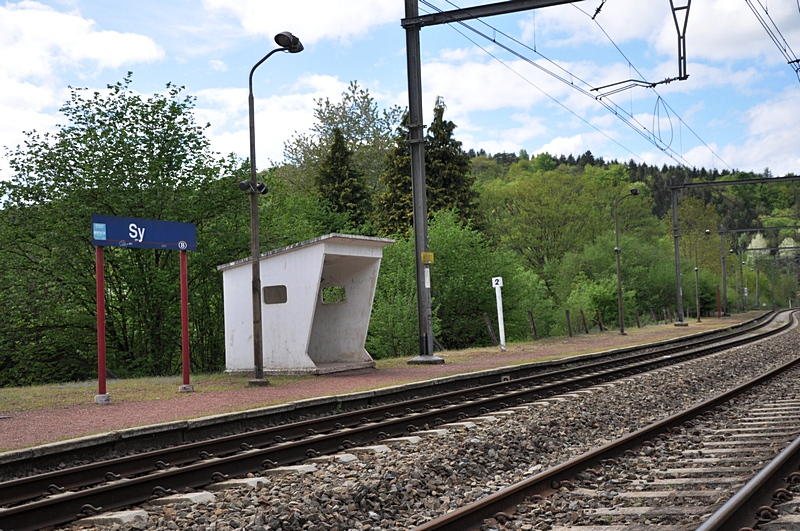
- Passenger shelter at the stop, shown in 2013.

General information
- Coordinates: 50°24′12″N 5°31′25″E
- Platforms: 2

History
- Opened: 31 October 1891
Location

Sy railway station is a Belgian railway stop on Line 43 (from Liège (Angleur) to Marloie), located in the village of Sy on the territory of the municipality of Ferrières, in the Walloon Region of the province of Liège. It is a railway stop of the National Railway Company of Belgium (SNCB) served by Omnibus (L) and Rush hour (P) trains.

== Geographical Location ==
Located at an altitude of 128 meters is located at Kilometric point (PK) 33.40 of the Angleur to Marloie rail line, between Hamoir and Bomal.

== History ==
The railway station was first put into service on October 31, 1891 by the Belgian State Railways along the rail line from Angleur to Marloie (opened in 1866). It is located on a curve near the bridge over the Ourthe, near a tunnel. A guard house (that has since been sold to a private individual), is the only former railway building on the site.

Between March 1915 and January 1917, travelers no longer had access to the Sy railway station, which was closed and then used only by German soldiers.

== Passenger Services ==
=== Facilities ===
An unstaffed SNCB passenger stop, it has with two platforms with shelters and an automatic ticket vending machine.

=== Train Services ===
Sy is served by SNCB Omnibus (L) and Rush hour (P) trains.
