= Silly railway station =

Railway station in Hainaut, Belgium

Silly
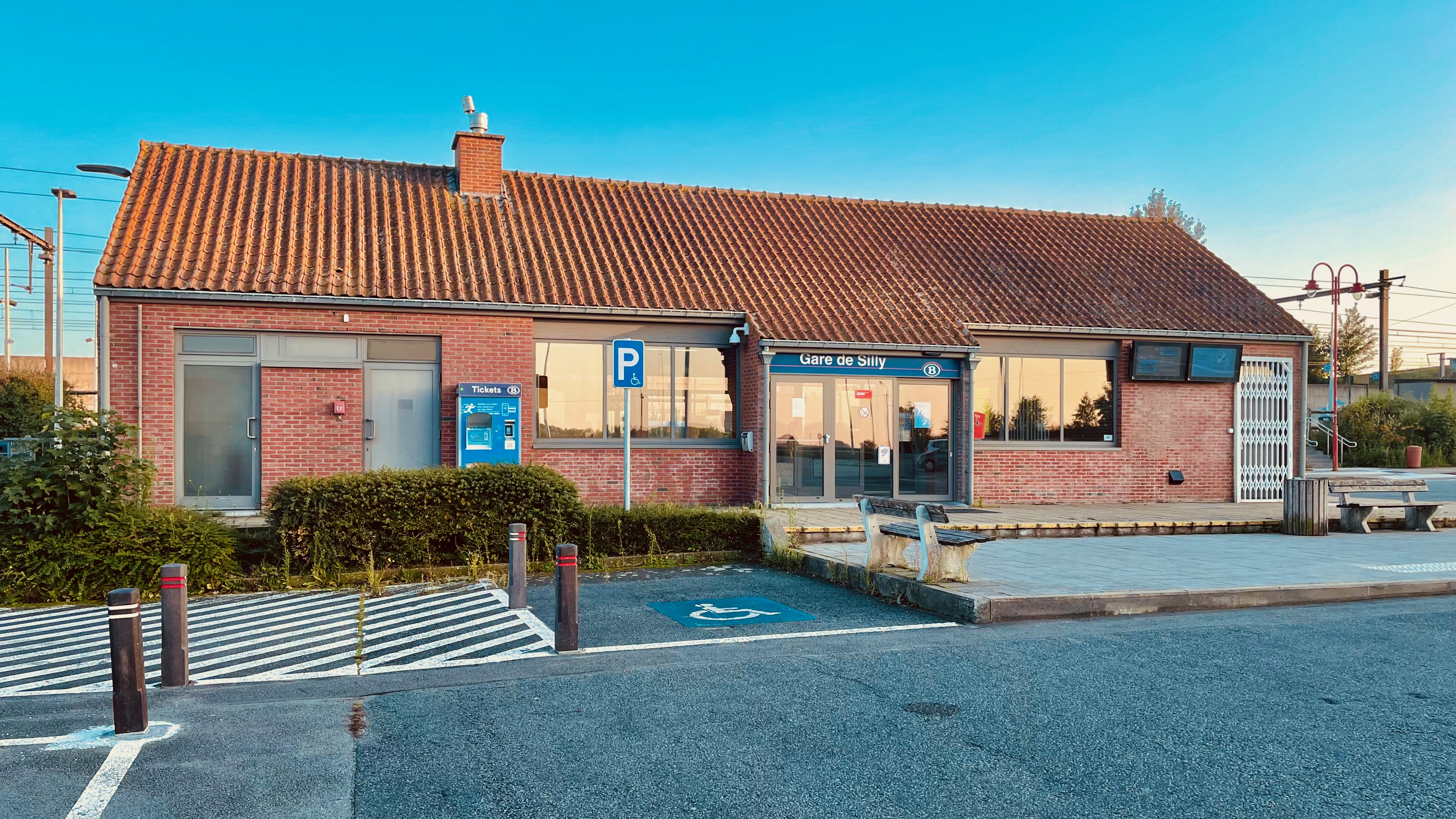
- Silly railway station

General information
- Location: Silly, Hainaut; Belgium
- Coordinates: 50°39′46″N 3°56′09″E
- System: Railway Station
- Owner: SNCB/NMBS
- Operator: SNCB/NMBS
- Line: 94

History
- Opened: 16 January 1866; 160 years ago
Location
- Location within Belgium Location within Europe

Silly railway station (French: Gare de Silly; Dutch: Station Opzullik) is a railway station in Silly, Hainaut, Belgium. It is located on railway line 94 which connects Brussels and Tournai. The adjacent stations for passenger traffic are Enghien and Ath.

The station was originally opened on 16 January 1866 as part of the segment of line 94 between Halle and Ath.

An accident occurred at the station on 17 November 2023, when a presumably drunk train driver missed stopping at the platforms. He then left the train, which was bound for Brussels. The passengers waited for three hours in the train and were taken by bus.

== See also ==
- List of railway stations in Belgium
- Rail transport in Belgium
