= Kapellen railway station =

Railway station in Antwerp, Belgium

Kapellen
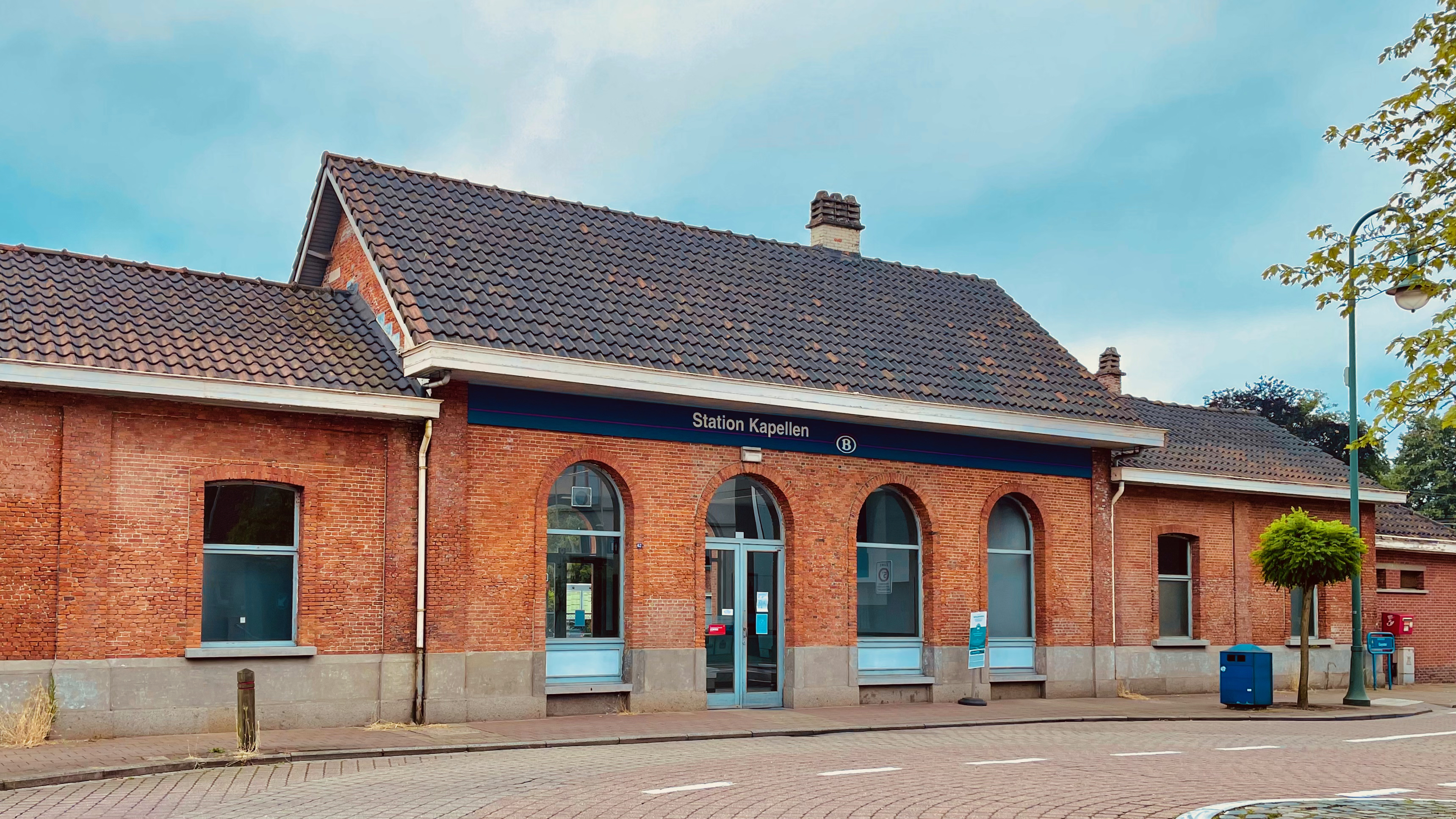
- Kapellen railway station

General information
- Location: Kapellen, Antwerp, Belgium
- Coordinates: 51°18′48″N 4°25′57″E
- System: Railway Station
- Owner: National Railway Company of Belgium
- Line: Line 12
- Platforms: 3 (towards Essen there is still an old platform that is occasionally used when there are disruptions in the schedule)
- Tracks: 2

History
- Opened: 26 June 1854
Location

Kapellen is a railway station in the town of Kapellen, Antwerp, Belgium. The station opened on 26 June 1854 on the Antwerp–Lage Zwaluwe railway, known in Belgium as Line 12. Just outside the station, to the north, on the east-side there is a single rail fork towards the military domain of Brasschaat. This fork leaves from the only stabling track between Noorderdokken and Essen. When the schedule is disrupted the slow train is often put on the sidetrack so that the express trains can pass the slow train.

== Infrastructure and surroundings ==
By the station there was a staffed crossing towards Hoogboom, it was operated from the signal cabin. The barriers used to be closed for long periods of time when a slow train stopped towards Essen. Because of that problem a new platform was built on the other side of the crossing, that way the crossing only had to close when the slow train arrived and not during the halting of the train. The platform has been built on the old cargo yard. With the platform, a spacious parking lot was also built. The old platform towards Essen, by the railway-station, is now out of service for the usual operating schedule. The two signal cabins have been demolished. One by the railway-station, the other at the end of the yard and sidetrack.

Near the railway-station there are still numerous old villas of rich people from Antwerp that fled the overcrowded city and commuted to the city by train.

De Lijn and the NMBS (National Railway Company of Belgium) have plans for the railway-station that processes more than 950 passengers per day. People think the old railway-station is charming, but old-fashioned and no longer suited for the modern-day standards. De Lijn also has plans for the railway-station, they want to make the railway station a center of the bus network as well.

== Railway accident ==
A while south of the railway-station there used to be a busy crossing with the Antwerpsesteenweg (the N11 Merksem - Putte). Because of the curve of the rails there is a crosslevel. Because of this the road on the crossing isn't flat. On 26 March 1979 a truck with a low-hanging trailer got stuck because of this. The driver tried to notify the railway station's personnel, but failed to do so in time. Because of the curve the blocked railroad wasn't visible to the oncoming train. The result, the locomotive of the Beneluxtrain derailed and landed on the old guardhouse of the barrier guard. The carriages did not derail and came to a standstill in Kapellen railroad station. There was 7 casualties of which one was fatal (the truck driver, who was standing next to the guard house when the locomotive derailed and landed on it).

This dangerous crossing was replaced by an underpass more than 27 years (27 years 5 months and 1 day, calculated based on the date of the opening of the underpass) after the incident, after 1 year and 9 months of construction.

== Train services ==
=== Week ===
Traintypes	Line	Schedule
IC05	Charleroi-South - Brussels - Antwerp - Essen	1/h
S32	Puurs - Antwerp - Roosendaal	1/h
S32	Puurs - Antwerp - Essen	1/h

=== Weekend ===
Traintype	Line	Schedule
S32	Puurs - Antwerp - Roosendaal	1/h
P	Essen - Antwerp - Heverlee	Sunday evening

== Traveler counts ==
Year	Weekday	Saturday	Sunday
2009	992	236	141
2012	1.053	408	302
2013	1.003	323	278
2014	1.036	298	296
2015	1.039	294	279
2017	1.211	375	341
