= Essen railway station, Belgium =

Railway station in Antwerp, Belgium

Essen
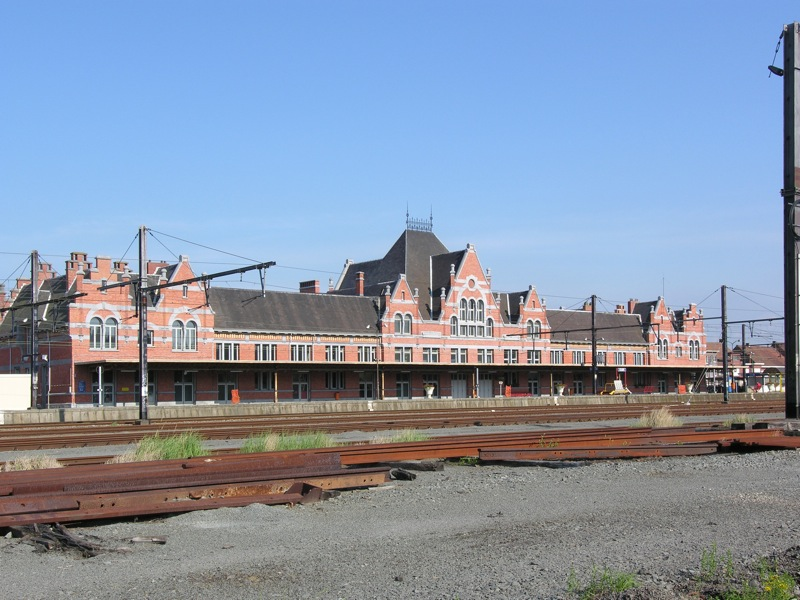

General information
- Location: Essen, Antwerp, Belgium
- Coordinates: 51°27′45″N 4°27′04″E
- System: Railway Station
- Owner: National Railway Company of Belgium
- Line: Line 12
- Platforms: 3

Construction
- Parking: Yes
- Cycle facilities: Yes

History
- Opened: 26 June 1854

Services
| Preceding station | NMBS/SNCB | Following station |
|---|---|---|
| Terminus | IC 22 | Kalmthout towards Bruxelles-Midi / Brussel-Zuid |
| Roosendaal Terminus | L 22 | Wildert towards Puurs |
Location

Essen is a railway station in the town of Essen, Belgium. The station opened on 26 June 1854 on the Antwerp–Lage Zwaluwe railway, known in Belgium as Line 12. Essen is a border station between the Netherlands and Belgium.

== Train services ==
The station is served by the following services:

- Intercity services (IC-22) Essen - Antwerp - Mechelen - Brussels (weekdays)
- Local services (L-22) Roosendaal - Essen - Antwerp - Puurs (weekdays)
- Local services (L-22) Roosendaal - Essen - Antwerp (weekends)
