= Heist-op-den-Berg railway station =

Railway station in Antwerp, Belgium

Heist-op-den-Berg
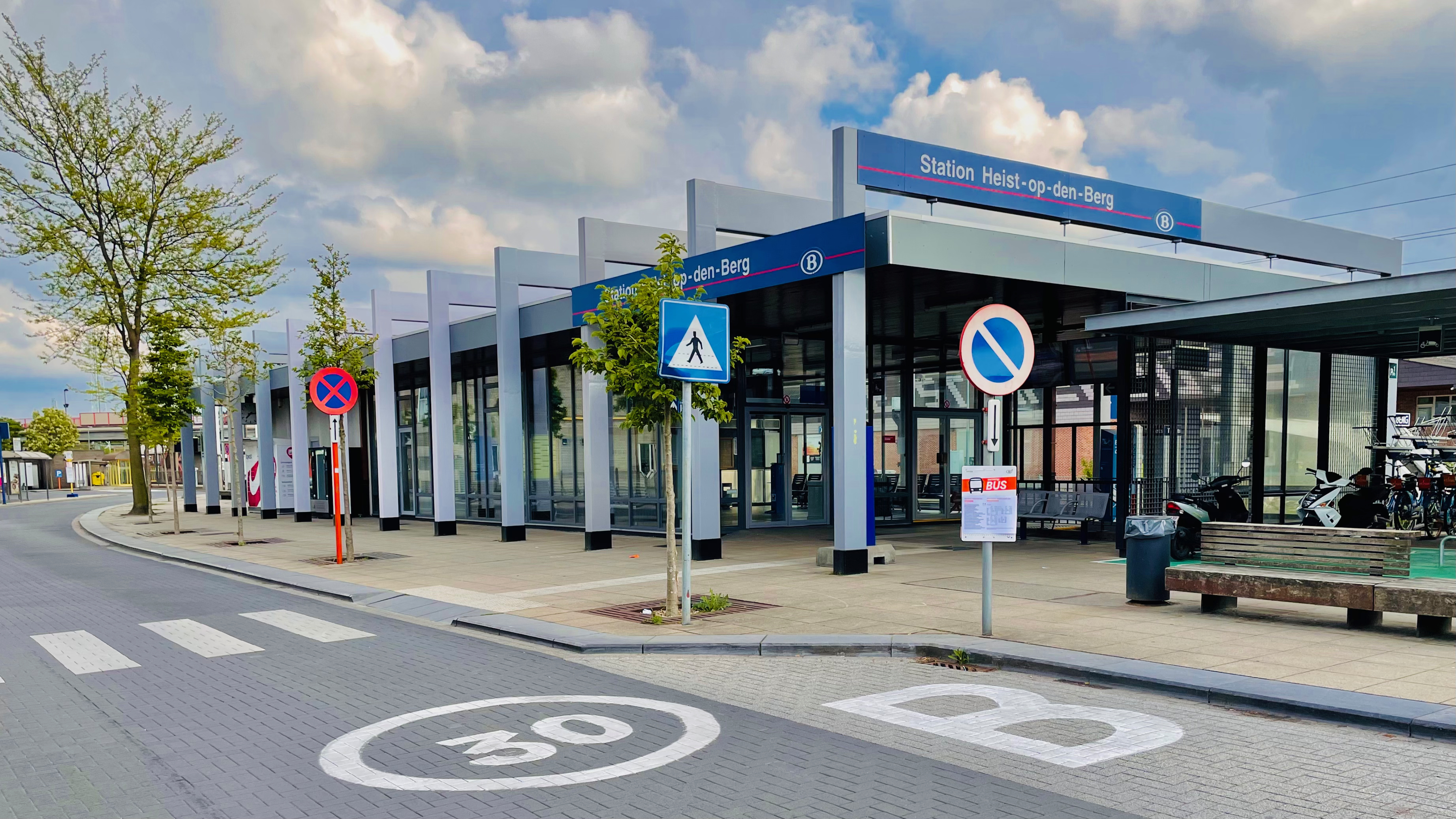
- Heist-op-den-Berg railway station

General information
- Location: Heist-op-den-Berg, Antwerp; Belgium
- Coordinates: 51°04′25″N 4°42′33″E
- System: Railway Station
- Owner: Infrabel
- Operator: National Railway Company of Belgium
- Line: 16 (Lier-Aarschot)
- Platforms: 3
- Tracks: 3

Other information
- Station code: GHO
- Website: http://www.belgianrail.be/en/stations-and-train/search-a-station/4/heist-op-den-berg.aspx

History
- Opened: 10 June 1864; 162 years ago

Passengers
- 2014: 1,770
Location
- Location within Belgium

Heist-op-den-Berg is a railway station in the town of Heist-op-den-Berg, Antwerp, Belgium. The station opened on 10 June 1864 and is located on line 16. The train services are operated by National Railway Company of Belgium (NMBS).

== Train services ==
The station is served by the following services:

- Intercity services (IC-09) Antwerp - Lier - Aarschot - Leuven (weekdays)
- Intercity services (IC-09) Antwerp - Lier - Aarschot - Hasselt - Liege (weekends)
- Local services (L-23) Antwerp - Lier - Aarschot - Leuven

Preceding station	NMBS/SNCB	Following station
Lier towards Antwerpen-Centraal	IC 09 weekdays, except holidays	Aarschot towards Leuven
Lier towards Antwerpen-Centraal	IC 09 weekends	Aarschot towards Liège-Guillemins
Melkouwen towards Antwerpen-Centraal	L 23	Booischot towards Leuven
