= Diepenbeek railway station =

Railway station in Limburg, Belgium

Diepenbeek
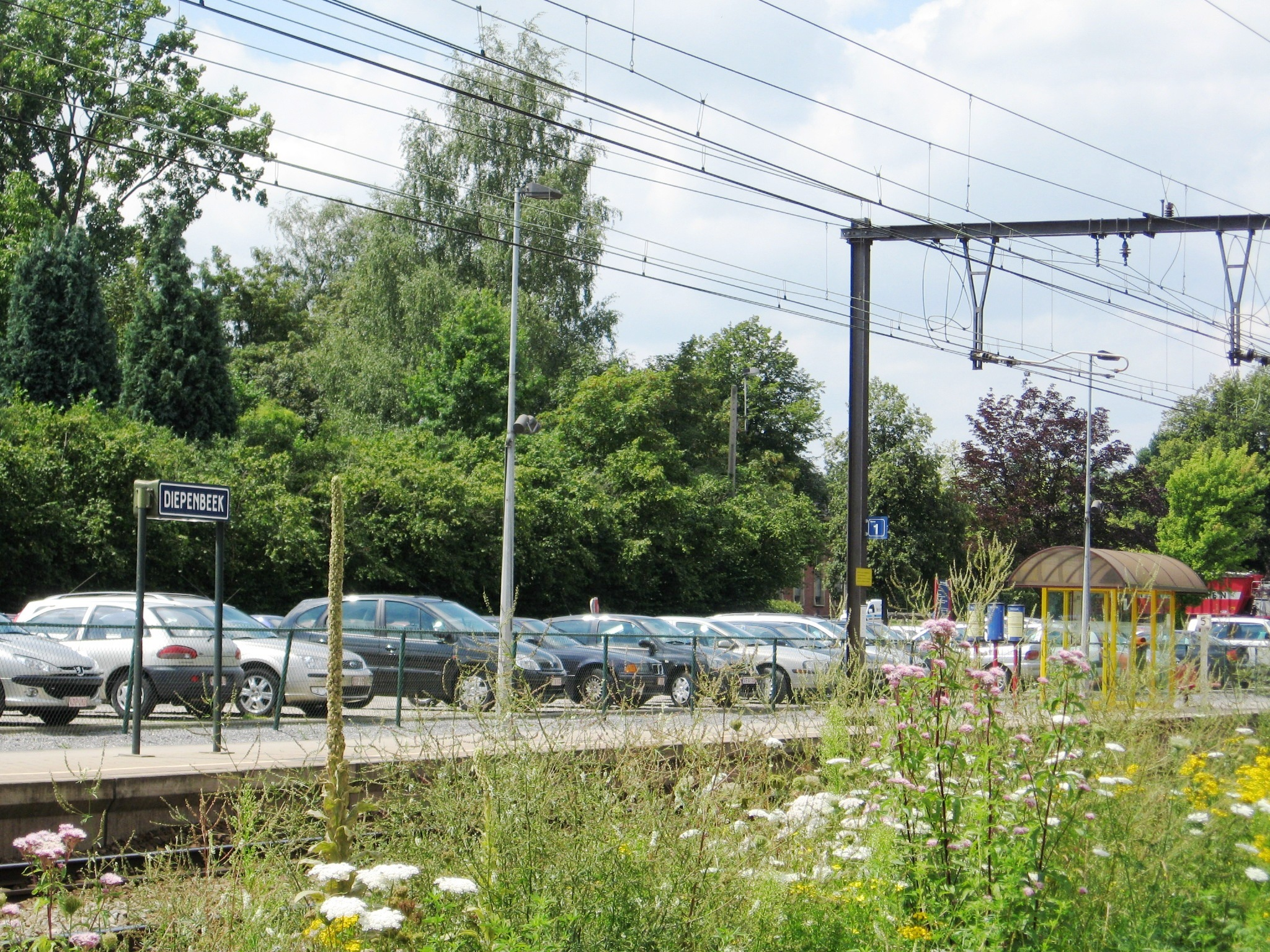

General information
- Location: Diepenbeek
- Coordinates: 50°54′40″N 5°25′05″E
- System: Railway Station
- Owner: Infrabel
- Operator: National Railway Company of Belgium
- Line: 34
- Platforms: 1
- Tracks: 2

Other information
- Station code: 1000324

History
- Opened: 1856-10-01; 1991-06-02
- Closed: 1957-09-29

Services
Preceding station	NMBS/SNCB	Following station
Hasselt towards Gent-Sint-Pieters	IC 20	Bilzen towards Tongeren
Hasselt Terminus	IC 13	Bilzen towards Maastricht
Hasselt towards Antwerpen-Centraal	IC 09 weekends	Bilzen towards Liège-Guillemins
Location
- Location within Belgium Location within Europe

Diepenbeek railway station is a railway stop on the Hasselt–Liège railway in the Belgian municipality of Diepenbeek.

The station was opened in 1856 along the new railway line between Hasselt and Maastricht. In the end of the 1950s, the station lost importance and was closed.

After the Limburg University Center was established near the former station in 1973, there was an increasing demand from students to reopen the station. This finally happened in 1991, when a stop was opened at the site of the former station.

In the context of the Spartacus plan, all level crossings in Diepenbeek will be removed, including the one in Stationsstraat. They will be replaced by passenger underpasses. In addition, the platforms will be renewed in 2021 and raised to the new standard of 76 centimetres (30 in).

== Services ==
=== Week ===
Train type	Connection	Timetable
IC 20	Tongeren – Hasselt – Aarschot – Brussels-South – Aalst – Gent-Sint-Pieters	1x/h
IC 13	Hasselt – Liège-Guillemins – Maastricht	1x/h

=== Weekend ===
Train type	Connection	Timetable
IC 09	Antwerpen-Centraal – Lier – Aarschot – Hasselt – Liège-Guillemins	1x/h
