= Tienen railway station =

Railway station in Flemish Brabant, Belgium

Tienen
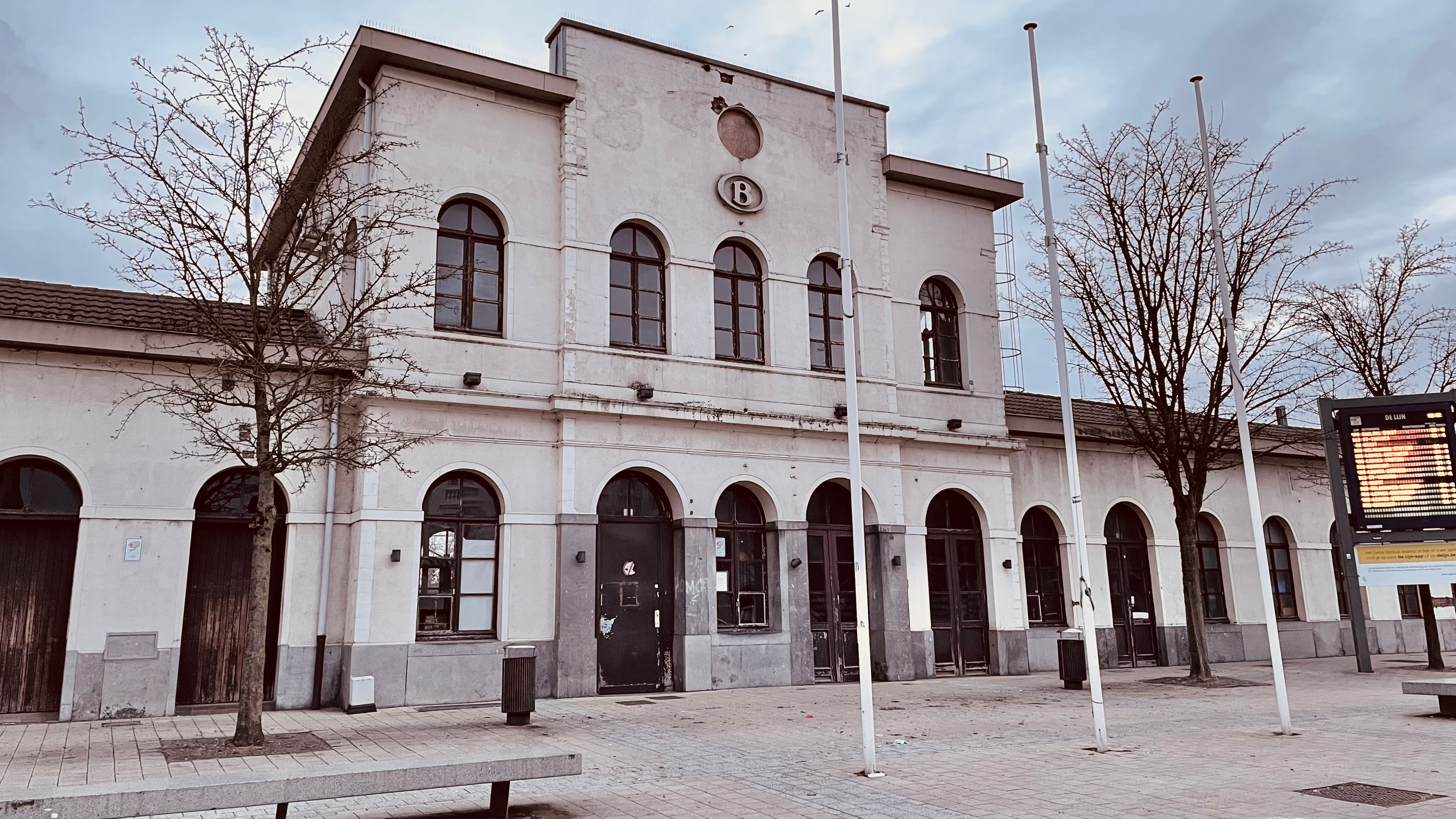
- Tienen railway station

General information
- Location: Tienen, Flemish Brabant; Belgium
- Coordinates: 50°48′29″N 4°55′33″E
- System: Railway Station
- Owner: NMBS/SNCB
- Operator: NMBS/SNCB
- Line: 36 (Brussels-Liège)
- Platforms: 5
- Tracks: 5

Other information
- Station code: FTNN

History
- Opened: 22 September 1837; 188 years ago

Passengers
- 2014: 4,033 per day
Location
- Location within Belgium Location within Europe

Tienen railway station (Dutch: Station Tienen; French: Gare de Tirlemont) (Note: Officially Tienen (Dutch: Tienen; French: Tirlemont)) is a railway station in Tienen, Flemish Brabant, Belgium. The station opened on 22 September 1837 and is located on railway line 36. The train services are operated by the National Railway Company of Belgium (NMBS/SNCB).

The station building dates from 1841 and is the oldest station building in Belgium that is still in existence.

Tienen used to be located on lines 22 (to Diest) and 142 (to Namur). These two lines were closed between 1967 and 1990 and are now cycle routes.

== Train services ==
The station is served by the following services:

- Intercity services (IC-03) Knokke/Blankenberge - Bruges - Ghent - Brussels - Leuven - Hasselt - Genk
- Intercity services (IC-14) Quiévrain - Mons - Braine-le-Comte - Brussels - Leuven - Liege (weekdays)
- Intercity services (IC-29) De Panne - Ghent - Aalst - Brussels - Brussels Airport - Leuven - Landen

Preceding station	NMBS/SNCB	Following station
Leuven towards Blankenberge or Knokke	IC 03	Landen towards Genk
Leuven towards Quiévrain	IC 14 weekdays	Landen towards Liège-Guillemins
Vertrijk towards De Panne	IC 29	Ezemaal towards Landen

== Gallery ==
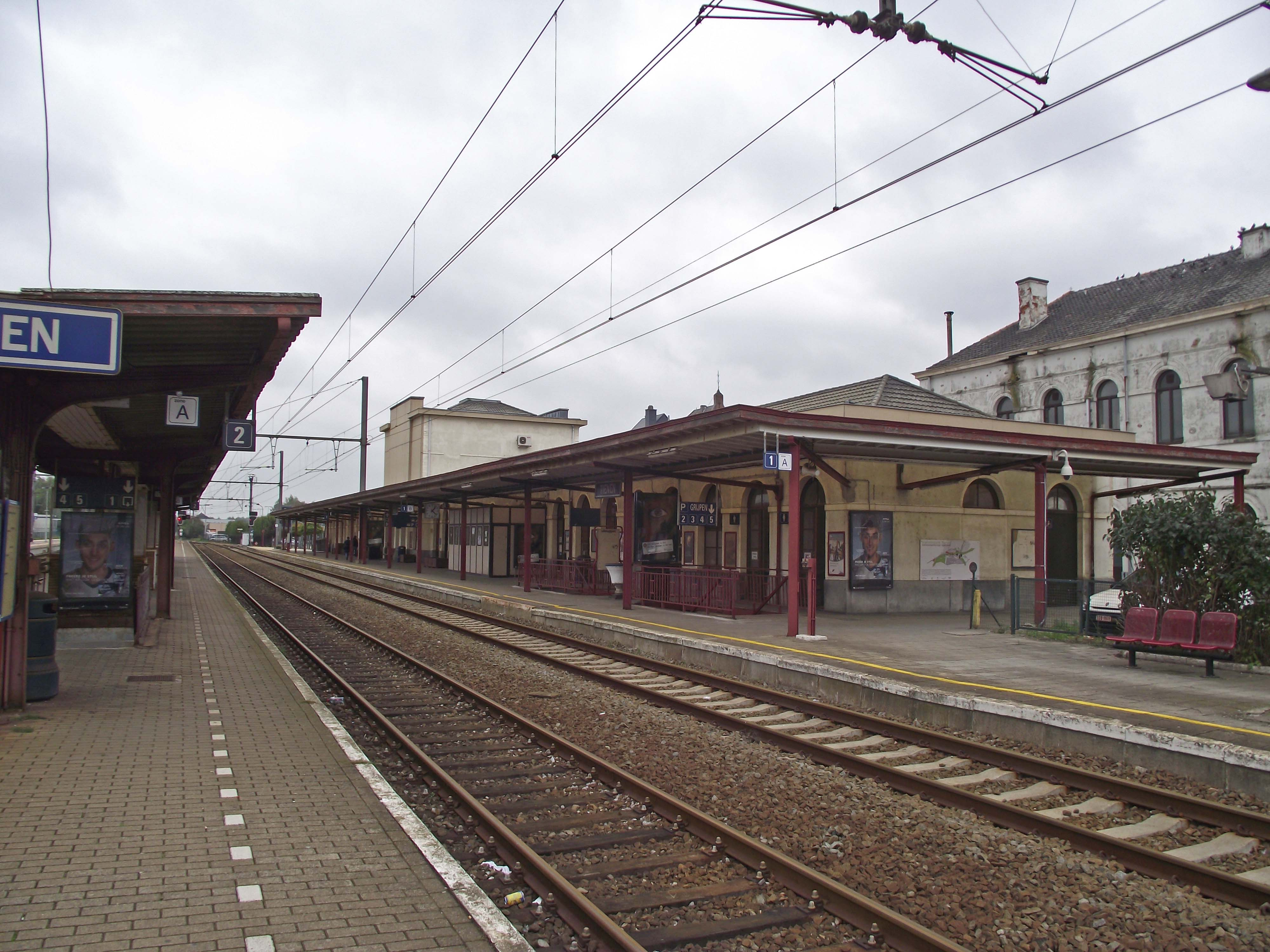
View of the platforms and tracks

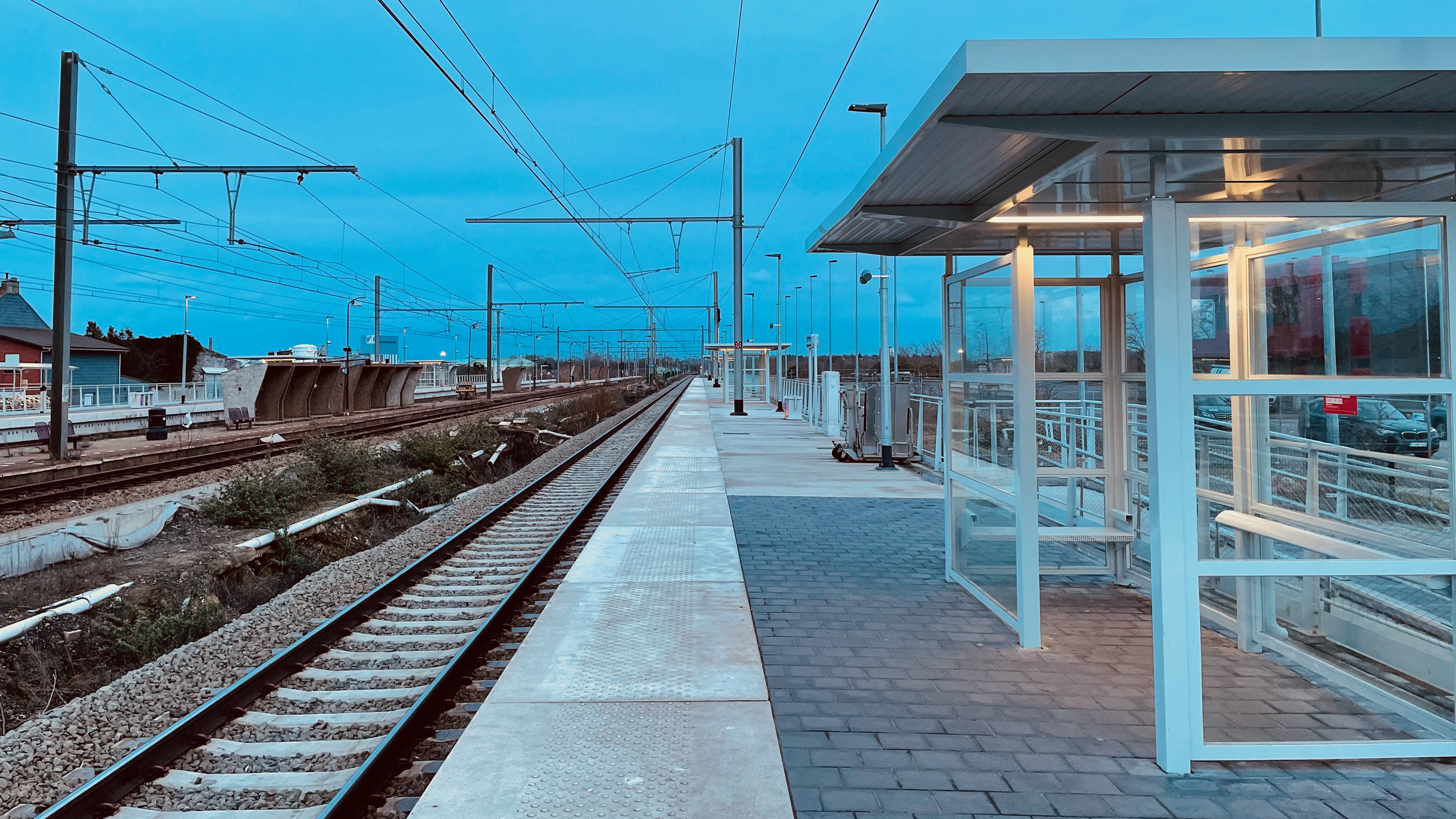
Another view of the platforms and tracks

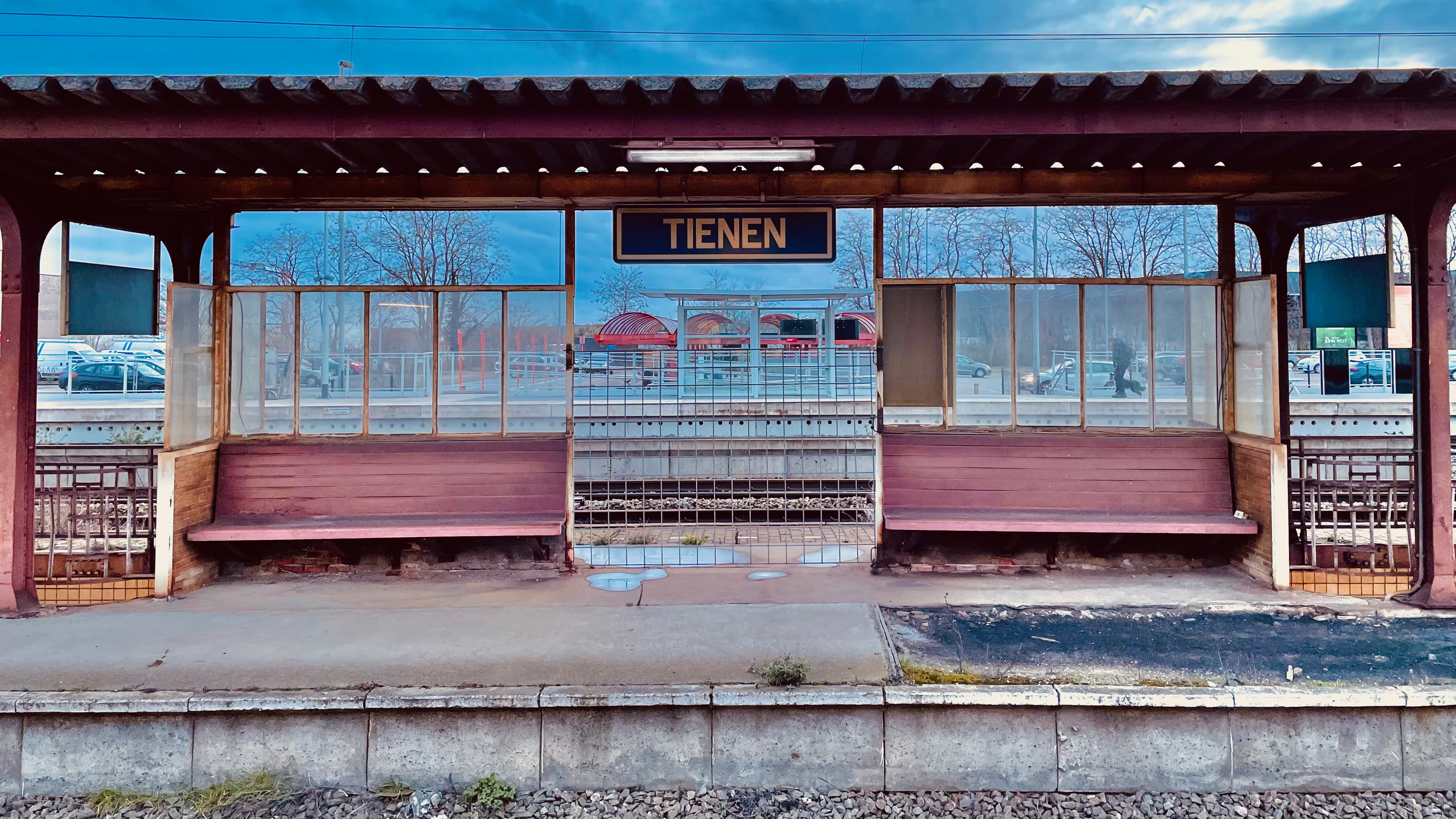
Place name sign on a platform

== See also ==
- List of railway stations in Belgium
- Rail transport in Belgium
