= Aarschot railway station =

Railway station in Flemish Brabant, Belgium

Aarschot
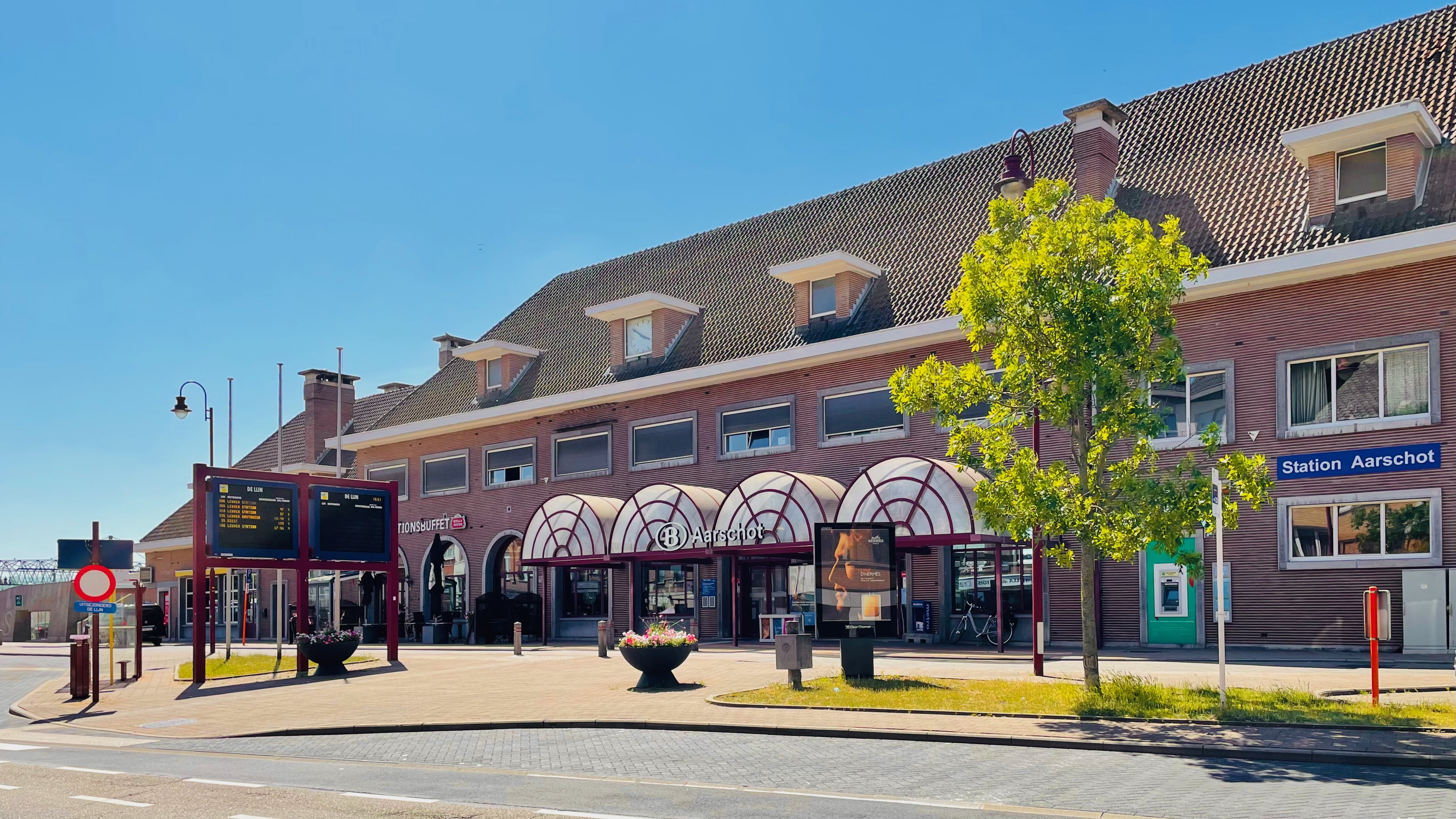
- Aarschot railway station

General information
- Location: Aarschot, Flemish Brabant; Belgium
- Coordinates: 50°59′03″N 4°49′26″E
- System: Railway Station
- Owner: NMBS/SNCB
- Operator: NMBS/SNCB
- Line: 35
- Platforms: 5
- Tracks: 5

Other information
- Station code: FRST

History
- Opened: 28 February 1863; 163 years ago

Passengers
- 2009: 5,039 per day
Location
- Location within Belgium Location within Europe

Aarschot railway station (Dutch: Station Aarschot; French: Gare d'Aerschot) (Note: Officially Aarschot (Dutch: Aarschot; French: Aerschot)) is a railway station in Aarschot, Flemish Brabant, Belgium. The station opened on 28 February 1863 and is located on railway line 35. The train services are operated by the National Railway Company of Belgium (NMBS/SNCB).

== Train services ==
The station is served by the following services:

- Intercity services (IC-08) Antwerp - Mechelen - Brussels Airport - Leuven - Hasselt
- Intercity services (IC-09) Antwerp - Lier - Aarschot - Leuven (weekdays)
- Intercity services (IC-09) Antwerp - Lier - Aarschot - Hasselt - Tongeren - Liege (weekends)
- Intercity services (IC-20) Ghent - Aalst - Brussels - Hasselt - Tongeren (weekdays)
- Local services (L-03) Leuven - Aarschot - Diest - Hasselt
- Local services (L-23) Antwerp - Lier - Aarschot - Leuven

| Preceding station | NMBS/SNCB | Following station |
|---|---|---|
| Leuven towards Antwerpen-Centraal | IC 08 weekdays | Diest towards Hasselt |
| Leuven towards Antwerpen-Centraal | IC 08 weekends | Langdorp towards Hasselt |
| Heist-op-den-Berg towards Antwerpen-Centraal | IC 09 weekdays, except holidays | Leuven Terminus |
| Heist-op-den-Berg towards Antwerpen-Centraal | IC 09 weekends | Diest towards Liège-Guillemins |
| Bruxelles-Nord / Brussel-Noord towards Gent-Sint-Pieters | IC 20 weekdays | Diest towards Tongeren |
| Wezemaal towards Leuven | L 03 weekdays | Langdorp towards Hasselt |
| Begijnendijk towards Antwerpen-Centraal | L 23 | Wezemaal towards Leuven |

== Gallery ==
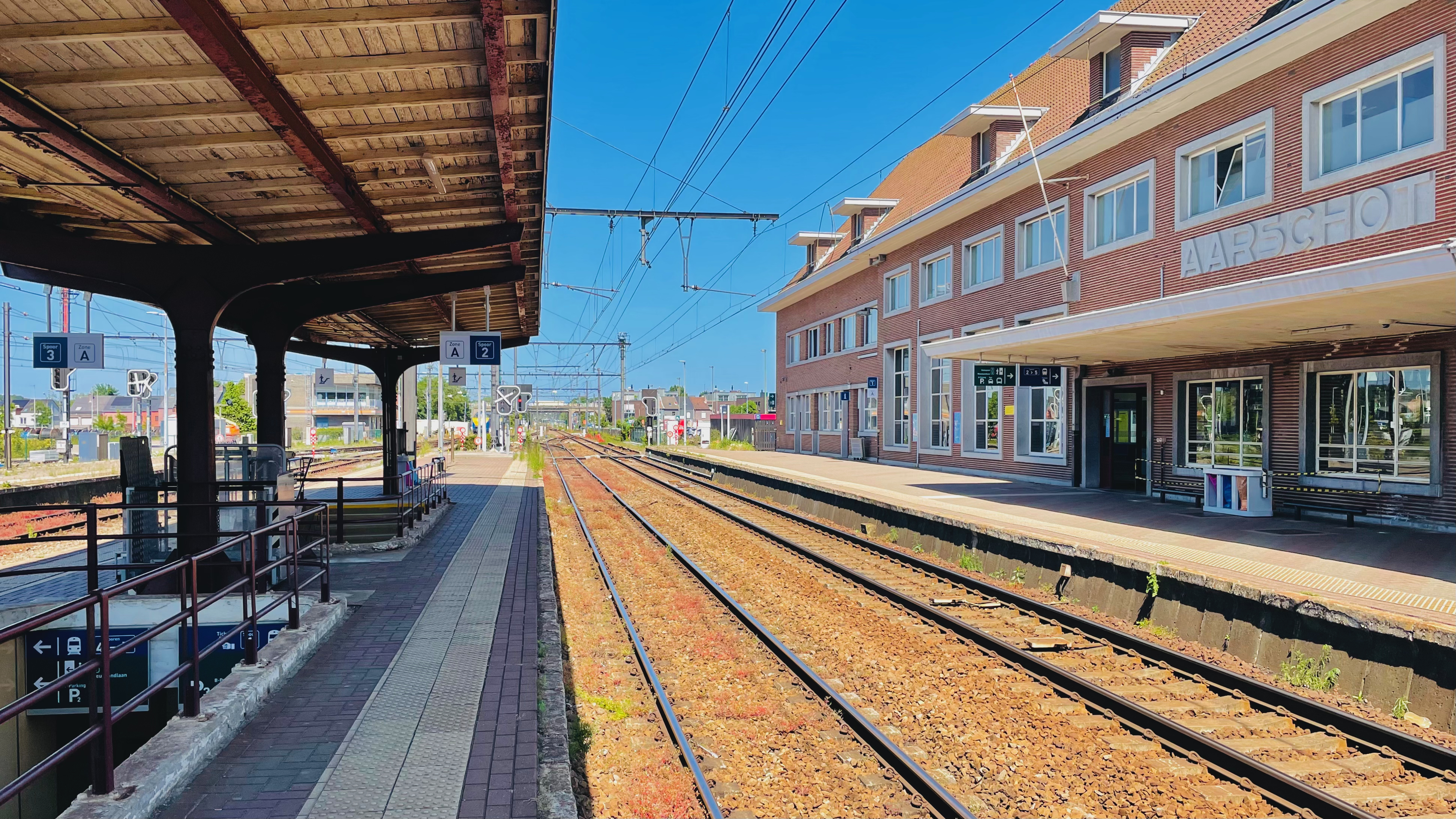
View of the platforms and tracks

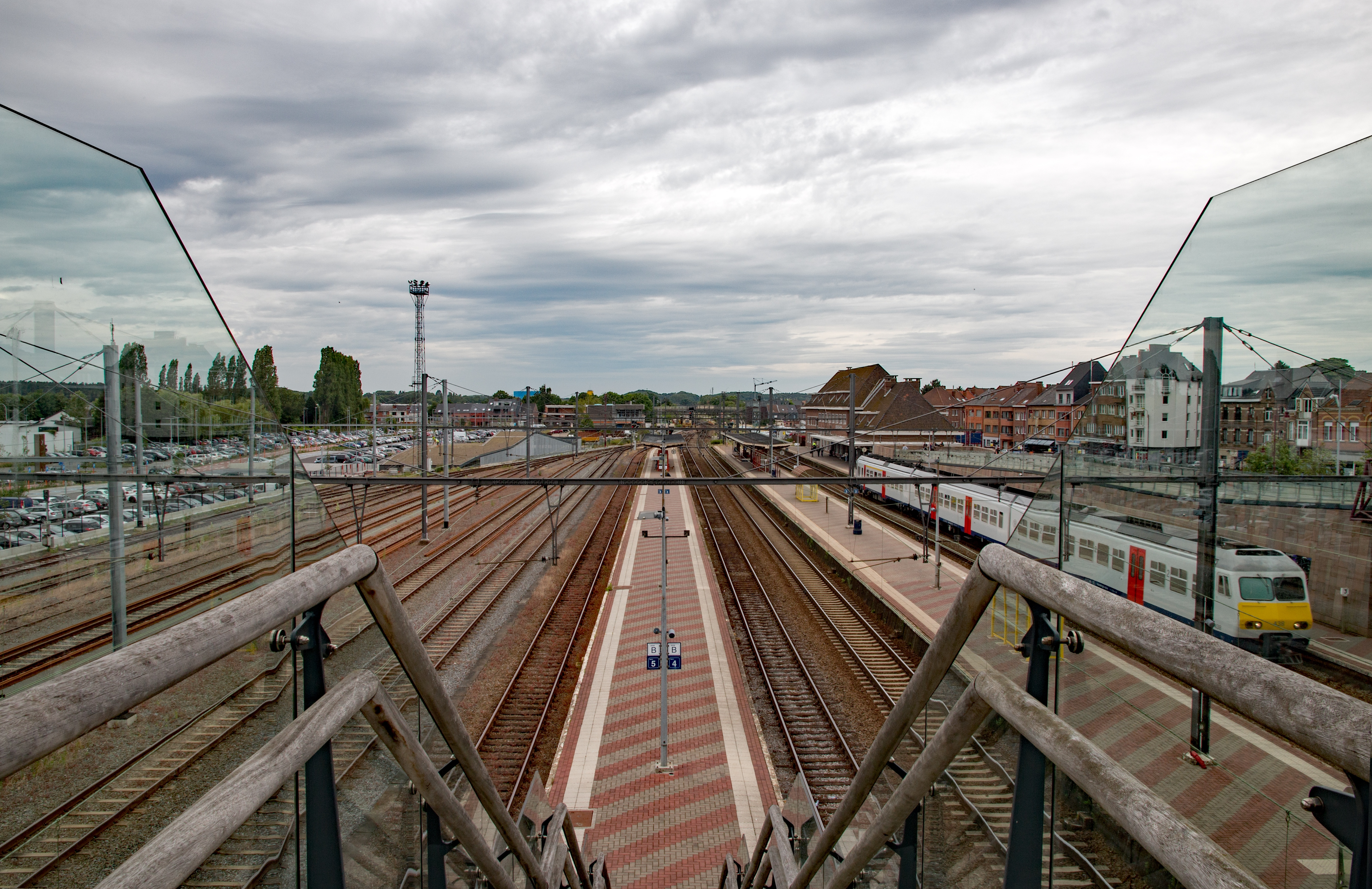
Looking down at the platforms and tracks

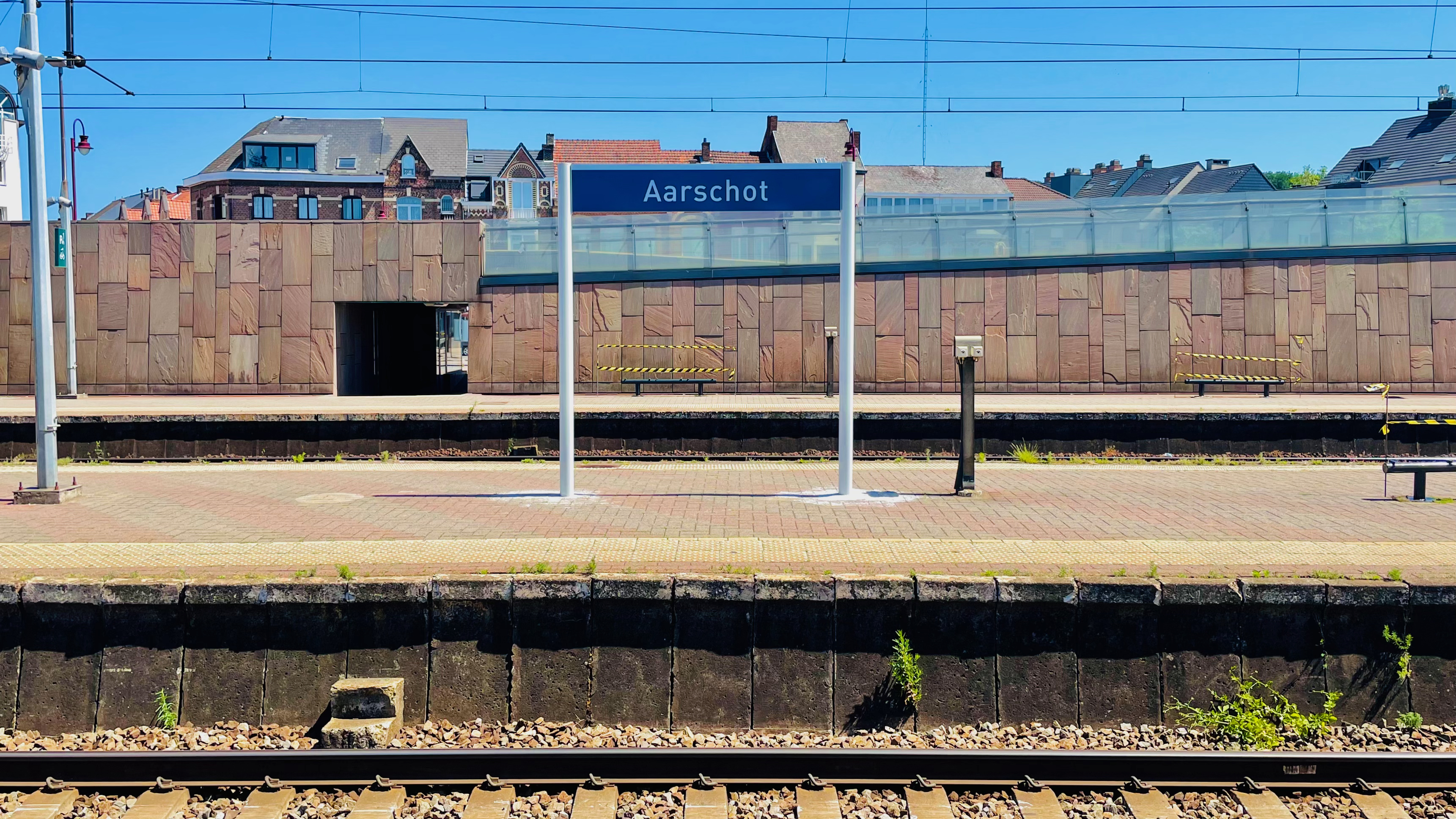
Place name sign on a platform

== See also ==
- List of railway stations in Belgium
- Rail transport in Belgium
