= Leuven railway station =

Railway station in Flemish Brabant, Belgium

Leuven
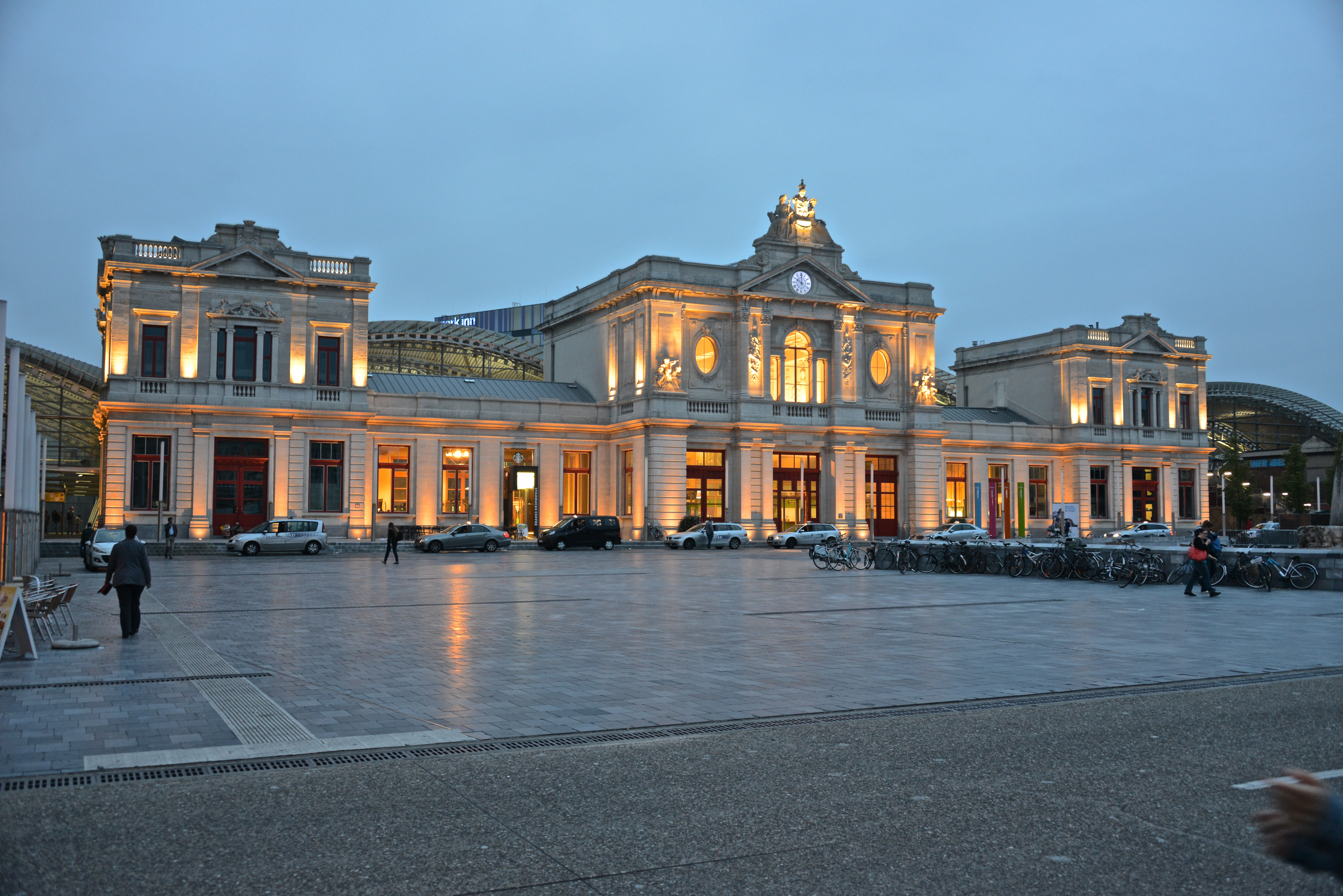
- Leuven railway station

General information
- Location: Martelarenplein, 3000 Leuven; Belgium
- Coordinates: 50.8814°N 4.7157°E
- System: Railway Station
- Owner: NMBS/SNCB
- Operator: NMBS/SNCB

Other information
- Station code: FLV

History
- Opened: 22 September 1837; 189 years ago

Services
Preceding station	DB Fernverkehr	Following station
Brussels Airport-Zaventem towards Antwerpen-Centraal	ICE 79	Liège-Guillemins towards Köln Hbf
Preceding station	NMBS/SNCB	Following station
Bruxelles-Nord / Brussel-Noord towards Oostende	IC 01	Liège-Guillemins towards Eupen
Bruxelles-Nord / Brussel-Noord towards Blankenberge or Knokke	IC 03	Tienen towards Genk
Brussels National Airport towards Antwerpen-Centraal	IC 08 reverse weekdays	Aarschot towards Hasselt
Terminus	IC 09	Aarschot towards Leuven
Bruxelles-Nord / Brussel-Noord towards Kortrijk	IC 12 weekdays	Liège-Guillemins towards Welkenraedt
Bruxelles-Nord / Brussel-Noord towards Quiévrain	IC 14 weekdays	Tienen towards Liège-Guillemins
Wijgmaal towards Gent-Sint-Pieters	IC 21 weekdays	Terminus
Brussels National Airport towards De Panne	IC 29	Vertrijk towards Landen
Terminus	L 03 weekdays	Wezemaal towards Hasselt
Wijgmaal towards Sint-Niklaas	L 20 weekdays	Terminus
Wijgmaal towards Mechelen	L 20 weekends	Terminus
Terminus	L 23	Wezemaal towards Antwerpen-Centraal
Herent towards Braine-le-Comte	S 2	Terminus
Herent towards Braine-l'Alleud	S 9 weekdays	Terminus
Terminus	S 20	Heverlee towards Ottignies
Location
- Location within Belgium Location within Europe

Leuven railway station (Dutch: Station Leuven; French: Gare de Louvain) (Note: Officially Leuven (Dutch: Leuven; French: Louvain)) is the main railway station in Leuven, Flemish Brabant, Belgium. The station is operated by the National Railway Company of Belgium (NMBS/SNCB) and is located on railway line 36. In 2007, it was the fifth-busiest station in Belgium, only preceded by the three main Brussels stations and Gent-Sint-Pieters railway station.

== Renovation ==
The station recently underwent extensive and costly renovations lasting several years. The square in front of the station houses a major bus terminal, as well as extensive bicycle and car parking. The station includes two tunnels which pass underneath the station for pedestrians, as well as an overhead bridge with elevators. The station is fully accessible for wheelchairs.

While a high-speed line passes through the station, Leuven is not a stop on any high-speed route. Current expansion is limited because the station has reached the maximum set of rail and platforms possible, meaning any further expansion would require building an underground segment.

== Train services ==
The station is served by the following services:

- Intercity services (IC-01) Ostend - Bruges - Ghent - Brussels - Leuven - Liege - Welkenraedt - Eupen
- Intercity services (IC-03) Knokke/Blankenberge - Bruges - Ghent - Brussels - Leuven - Hasselt - Genk
- Intercity services (IC-08) Antwerp - Mechelen - Brussels Airport - Leuven - Hasselt
- Intercity services (IC-09) Antwerp - Lier - Aarschot - Leuven (weekdays)
- Intercity services (IC-12) Kortrijk - Ghent - Brussels - Leuven - Liege - Welkenraedt (weekdays)
- Intercity services (IC-14) Quiévrain - Mons - Braine-le-Comte - Brussels - Leuven - Liege (weekdays)
- Intercity services (IC-21) Ghent - Dendermonde - Mechelen - Leuven (weekdays)
- Intercity services (IC-29) De Panne - Ghent - Aalst - Brussels - Brussels Airport - Leuven - Landen
- Local services (L-03) Leuven - Aarschot - Diest - Hasselt (weekends)
- Local services (L-20) Sint-Niklaas – Mechelen – Leuven (weekdays)
- Local services (L-20) Mechelen - Leuven (weekends)
- Local services (L-23) Antwerp - Lier - Aarschot - Leuven
- Brussels RER services (S2) Braine-le-Comte - Halle - Brussels - Leuven
- Brussels RER services (S9) Braine-l'Alleud - Etterbeek - Brussels-Luxembourg - Leuven (weekdays, peak hours only)
- Brussels RER services (S20) Leuven - Wavre - Ottignies

== Accidents and incidents ==
- On 18 February 2017, a passenger train was derailed near Leuven. One person was killed and 27 were injured.

== Gallery ==
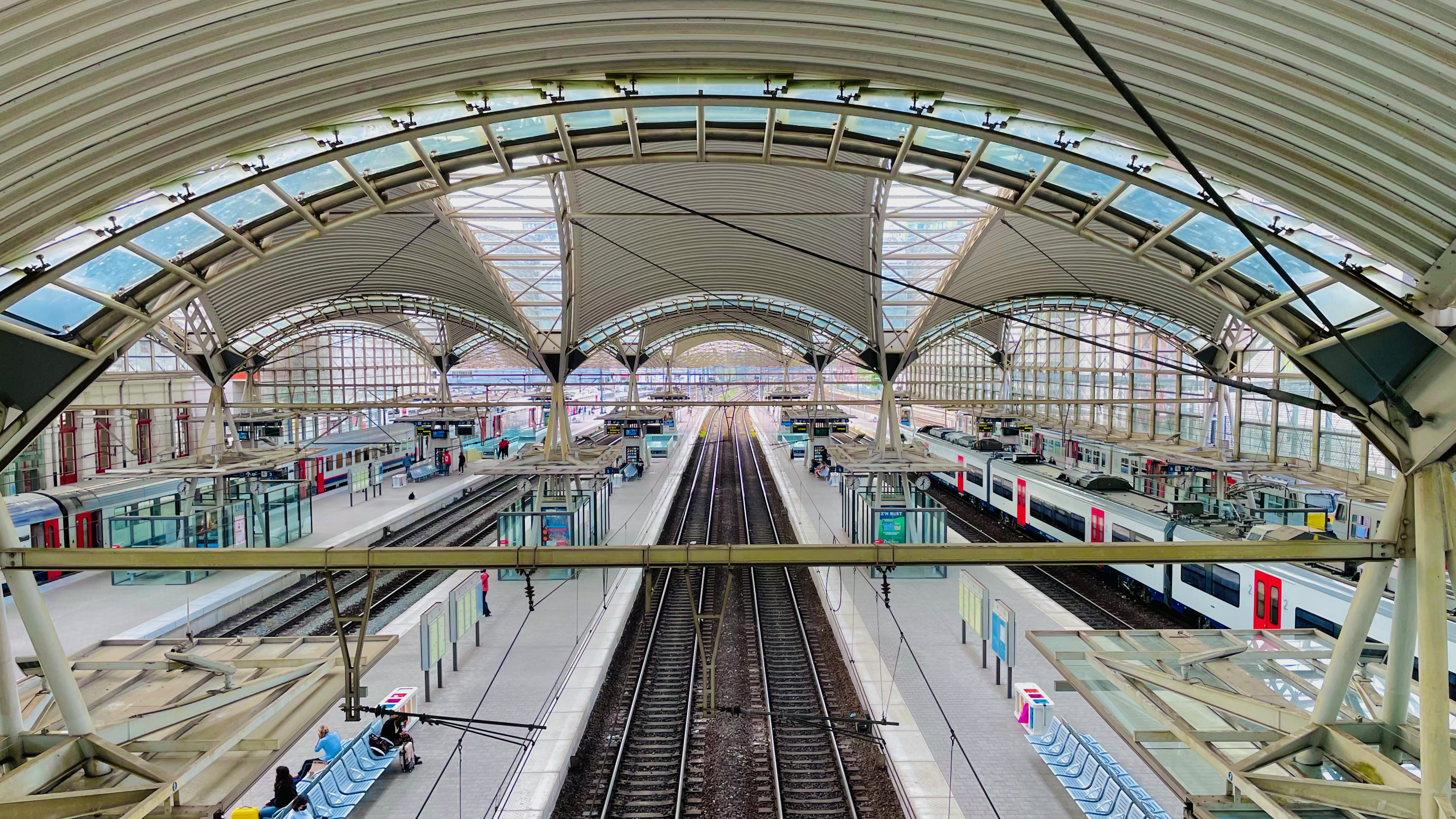
Looking down at the platforms and tracks

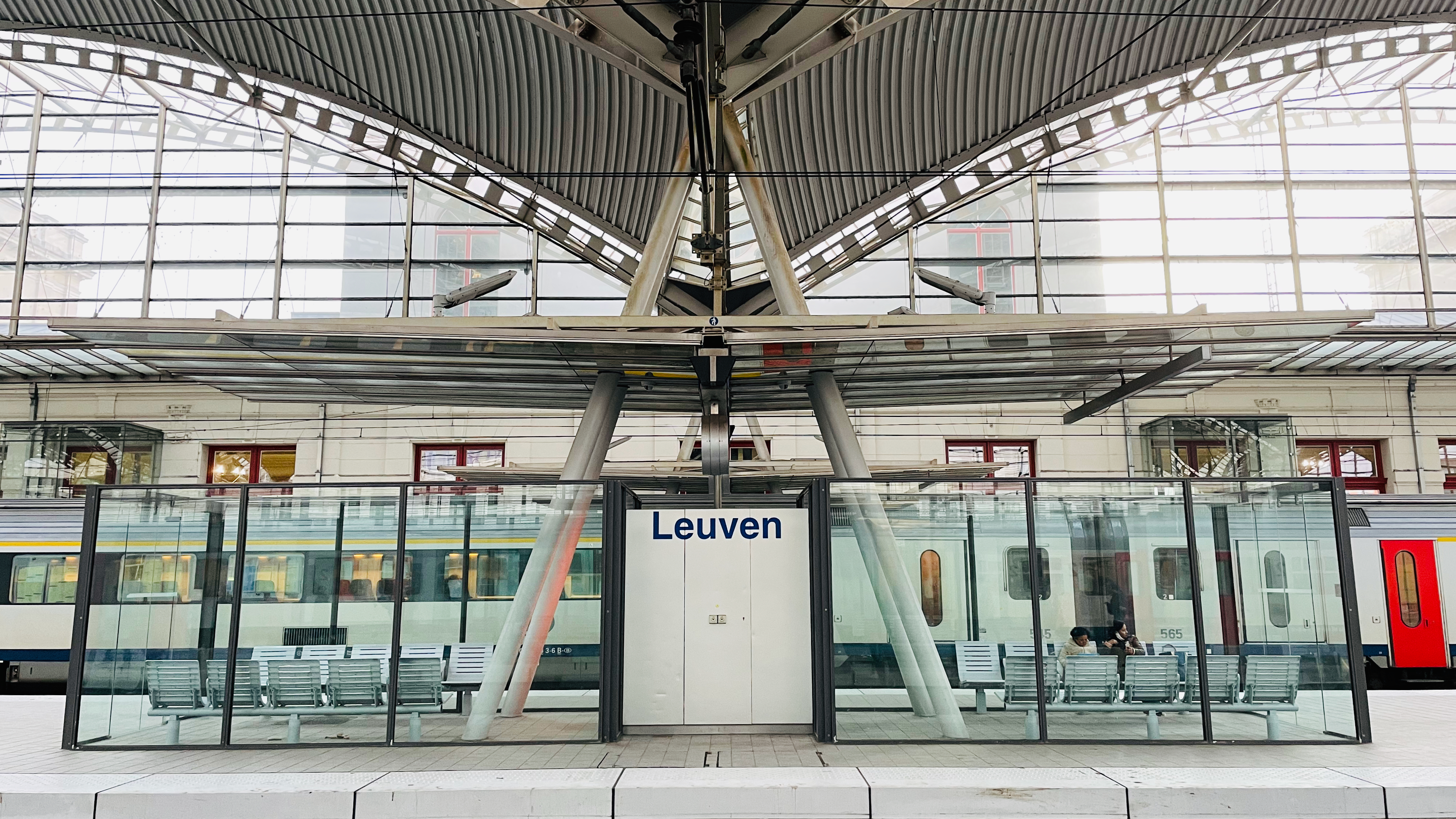
Place name sign on a platform

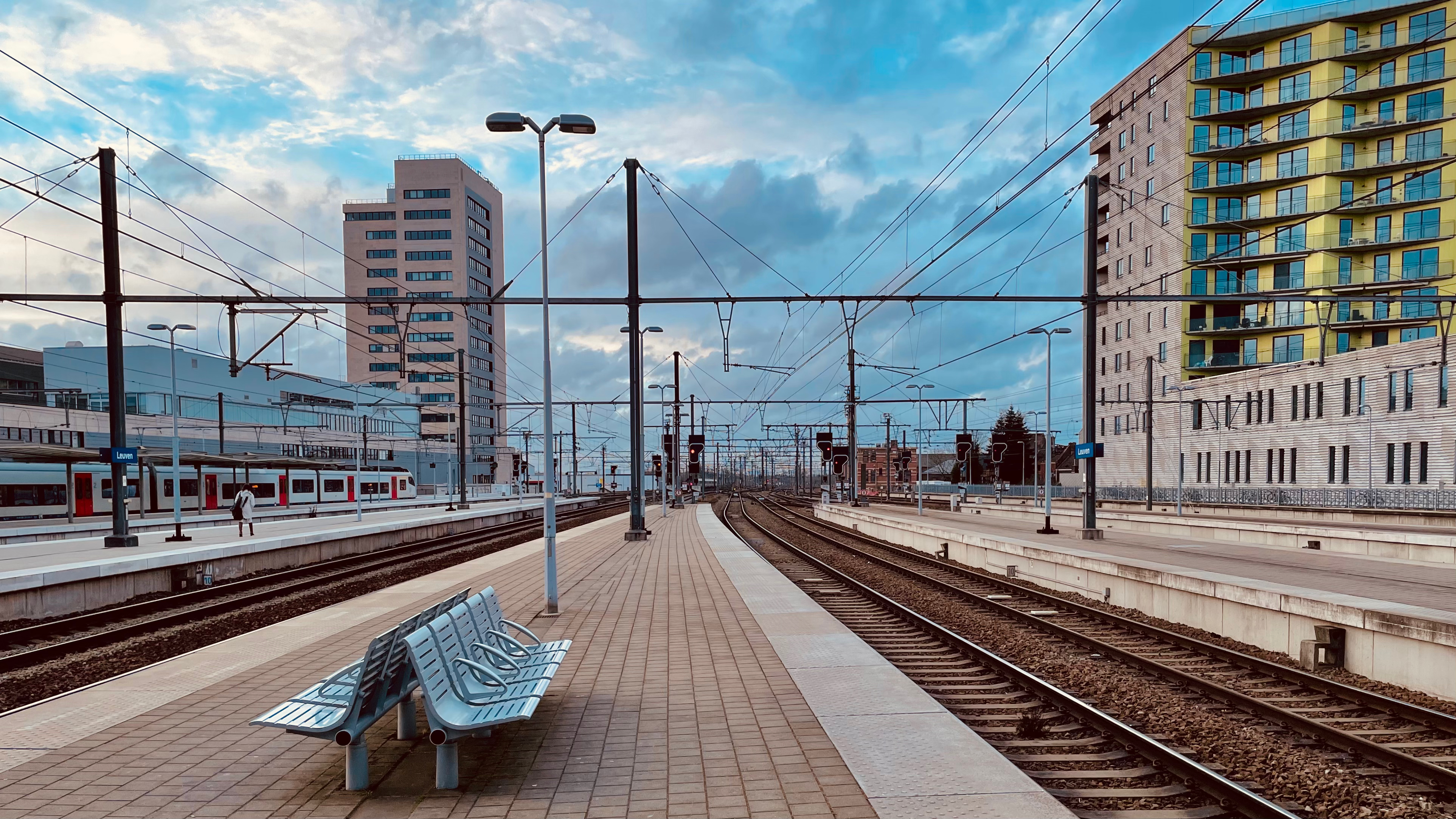
View of the platforms and tracks

== See also ==
- List of railway stations in Belgium
- Rail transport in Belgium
