= Wijgmaal railway station =

Railway station in Flemish Brabant, Belgium

Wijgmaal railway station (Dutch: station Wijgmaal) is a Belgian railway station located on Line 53, located in Wijgmaal, a village located within the boundaries of the city of Leuven, in Flemish Brabant in the Flemish Region of the country.

It was named "Herent" when it was put into service in 1864 by the Belgian State Railways administration, being given its current name in 1866.

The station is a passenger stop for the National Railway Company of Belgium (SNCB) served by InterCity (IC), Omnibus (L) and Express trains (P).

== Location along the railway ==
At an altitude of 17 meters above sea level, Wijgmaal station is located at kilometric point (PK) 59.428 of Line 53 (from Schellebelle to Leuven), between the currently operating stations at Hambos and Leuven.

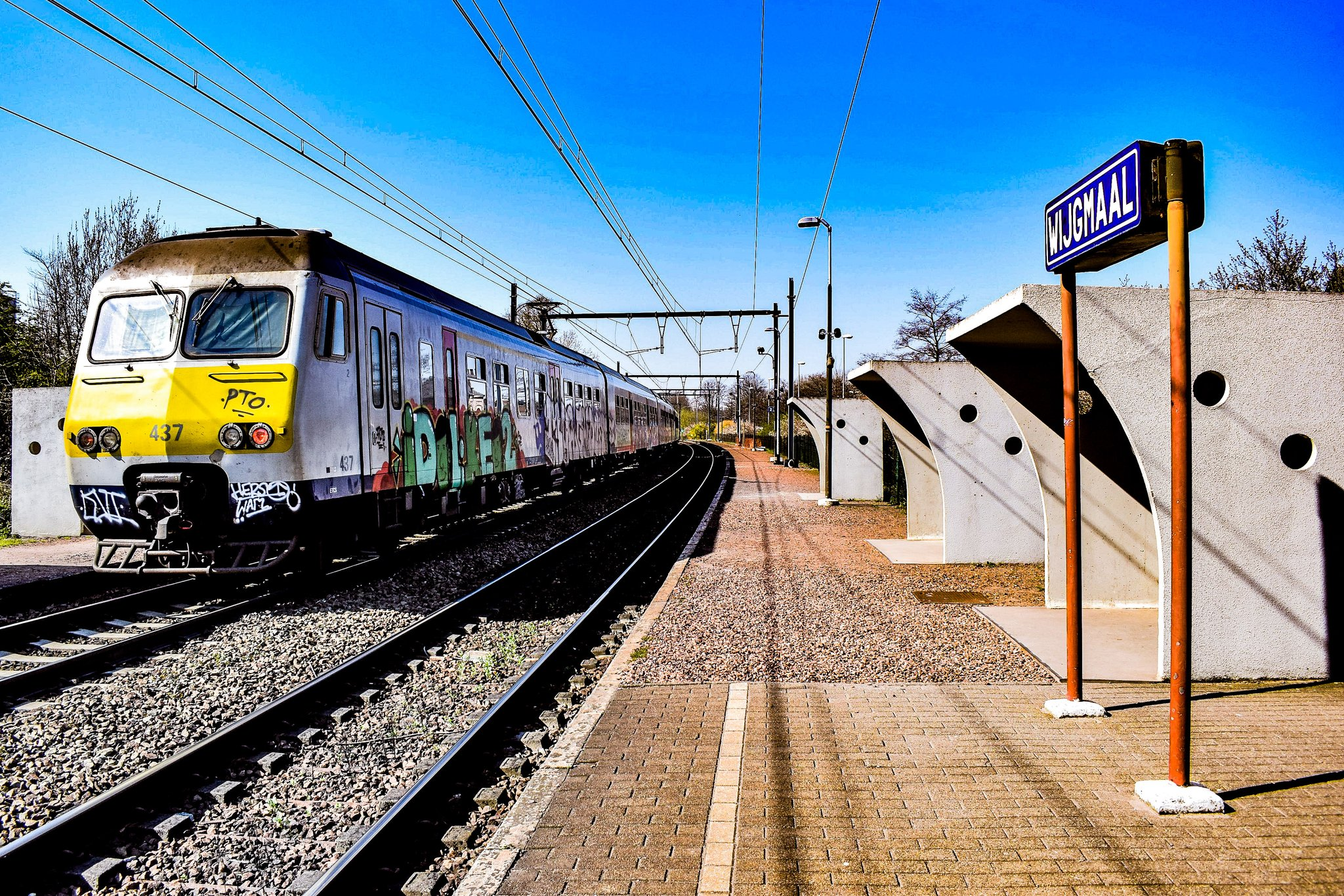
Train stopped at the station.

== History ==
"Herent railway station" was opened for service on 7 August 1864 by the Belgian State Railways (the spellings "Herent" or "Hérent" were also used before the station opened). It is located at the level crossing of the roadway leading from the Wygmael windmills to the canal. It was then served by four trains bound for Mechelen and an equal number heading to Leuven.

On 18 December 1866 it was renamed "Wygmael".

An 1881-type station was built there with an enlarged second floor; this part would later be demolished.

It was also common to see the spelling "Wygmaal" before the name being officially modified to "Wijgmaal" on 1 February 1938.

The ticket office was closed on 23 May 1993. Since then, the station has operated as an unstaffed stop.

After closure of the ticket office, the building was abandoned and the service wing was destroyed by fire. The station has since undergone restoration to be used as housing.

== Passenger service ==
=== Amenities ===
The site is now an unstaffed SNCB railway stop.

Crossing the tracks and passage from one platform to another is done using the roadway level crossing.

=== Trains serving the station ===
Wijgmaal is served by InterCity (IC), Omnibus (L) and Rush hour (P) SNCB trains operating over the commercially-used Line 53 (Leuven - Mechelen).

During the week, the service includes:

- IC-21 with frequent stops between Leuven and Gent-Sint-Pieters via Mechelen and Termonde;
- L trains between Leuven and Sint-Niklaas;
- two P trains from Leuven to Mechelen (mornings);
- two P trains from Termonde to Leuven and one from Leuven to Termonde (mornings);
- a single P train fromde Sint-Niklaas to Leuven (mornings) and another (in the same direction) afternoons;
- a single P train from Mechelen to Leuven (afternoons);
- two P trains from Leuven to Termonde and one train from Termonde to Leuven (afternoons).

Weekends and holidays, only IC-21 trains from Leuven to Mechelen operate.

=== Intermodal services ===
A parking lot for bicycles and vehicles is available.

== Gallery ==
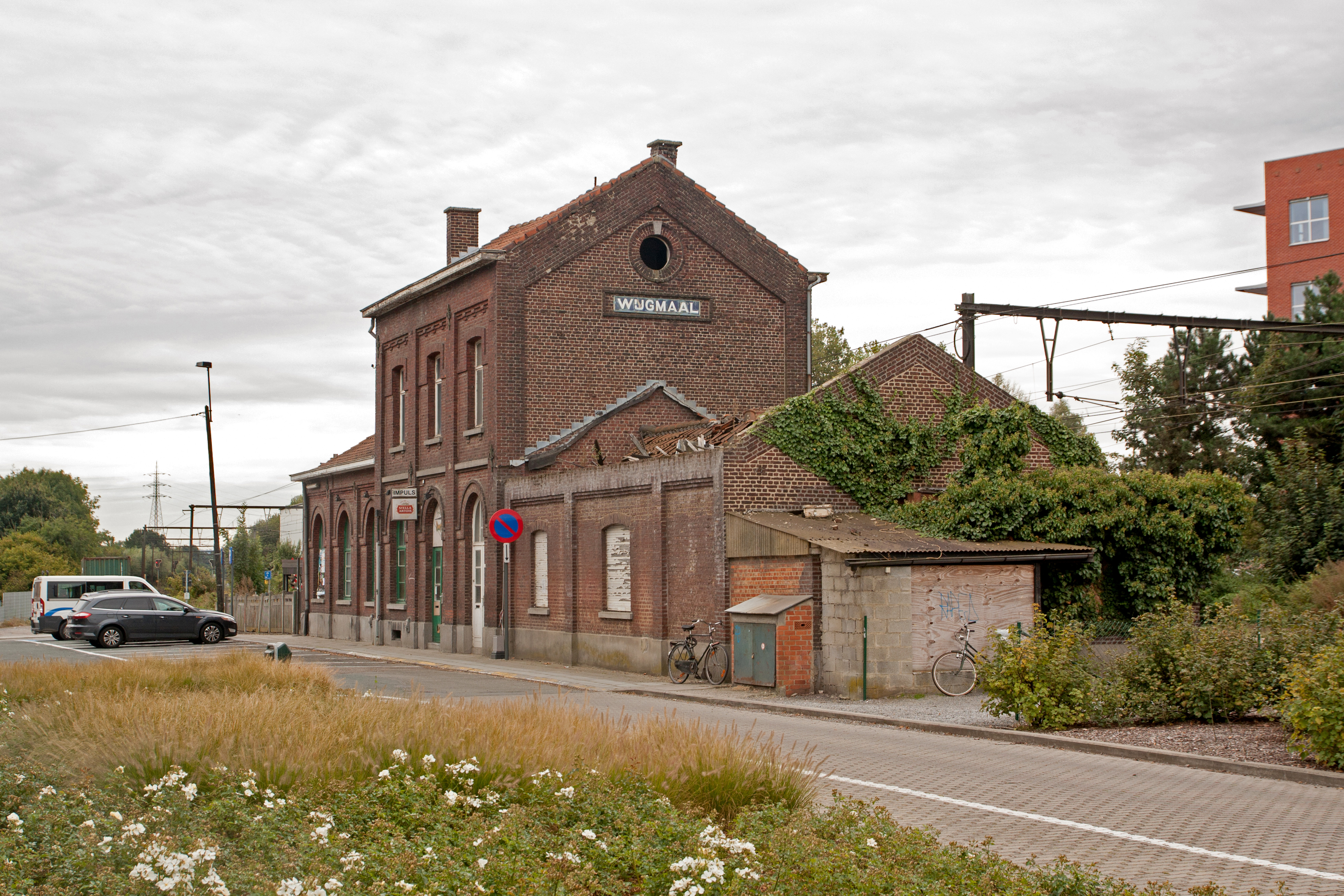
Former station building before renovations

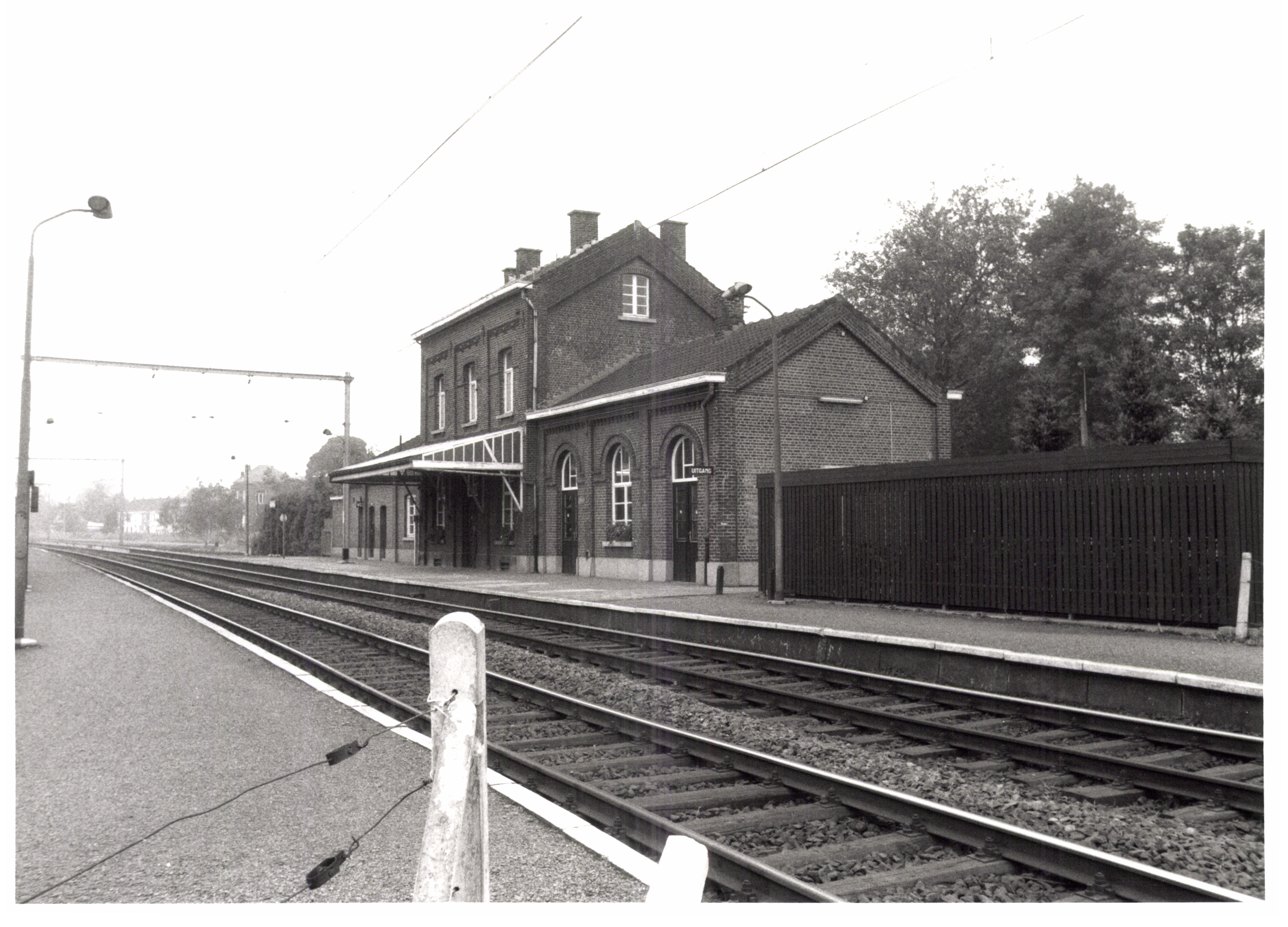
Trackside shown in 1984

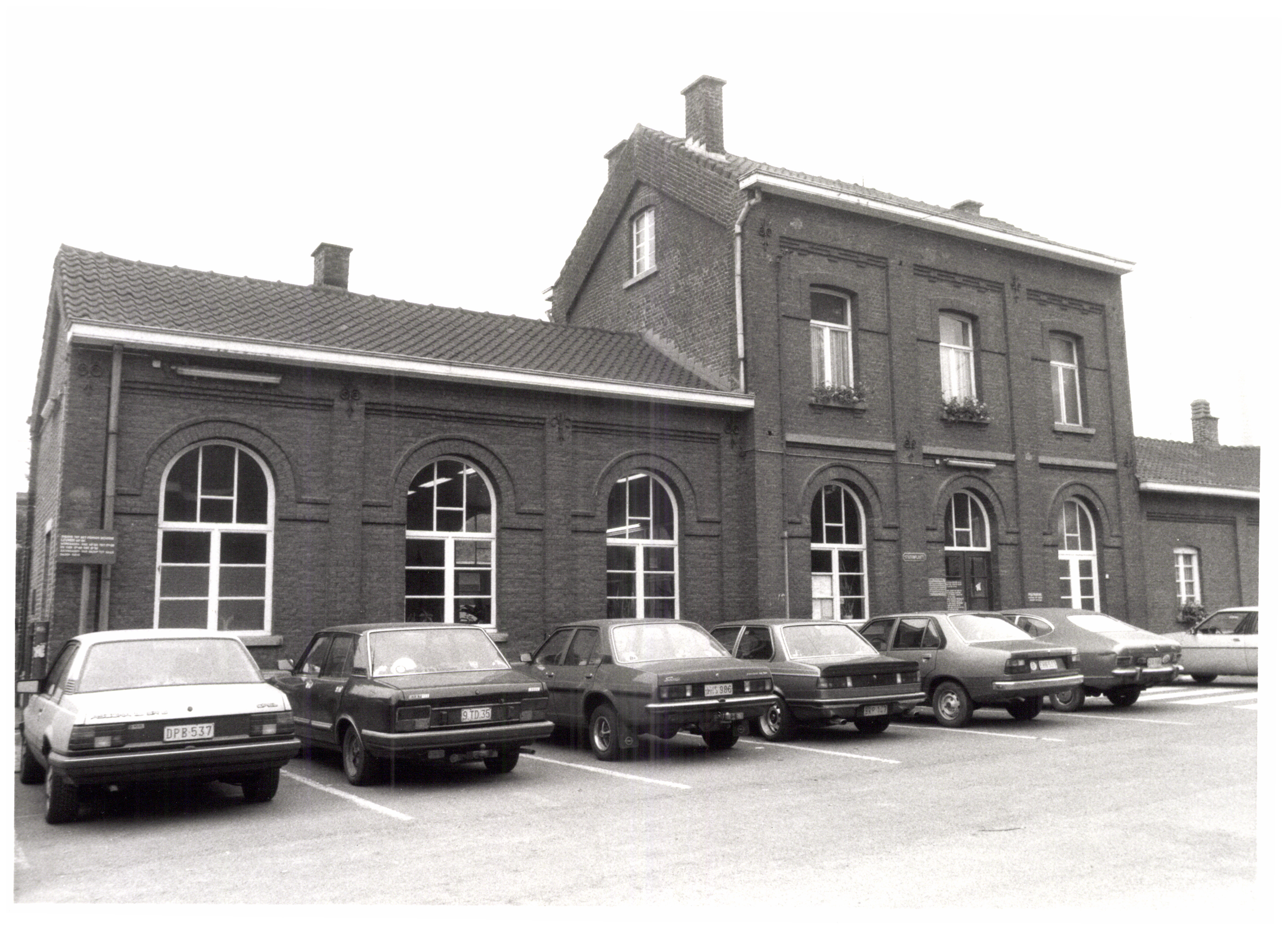
Streetside view

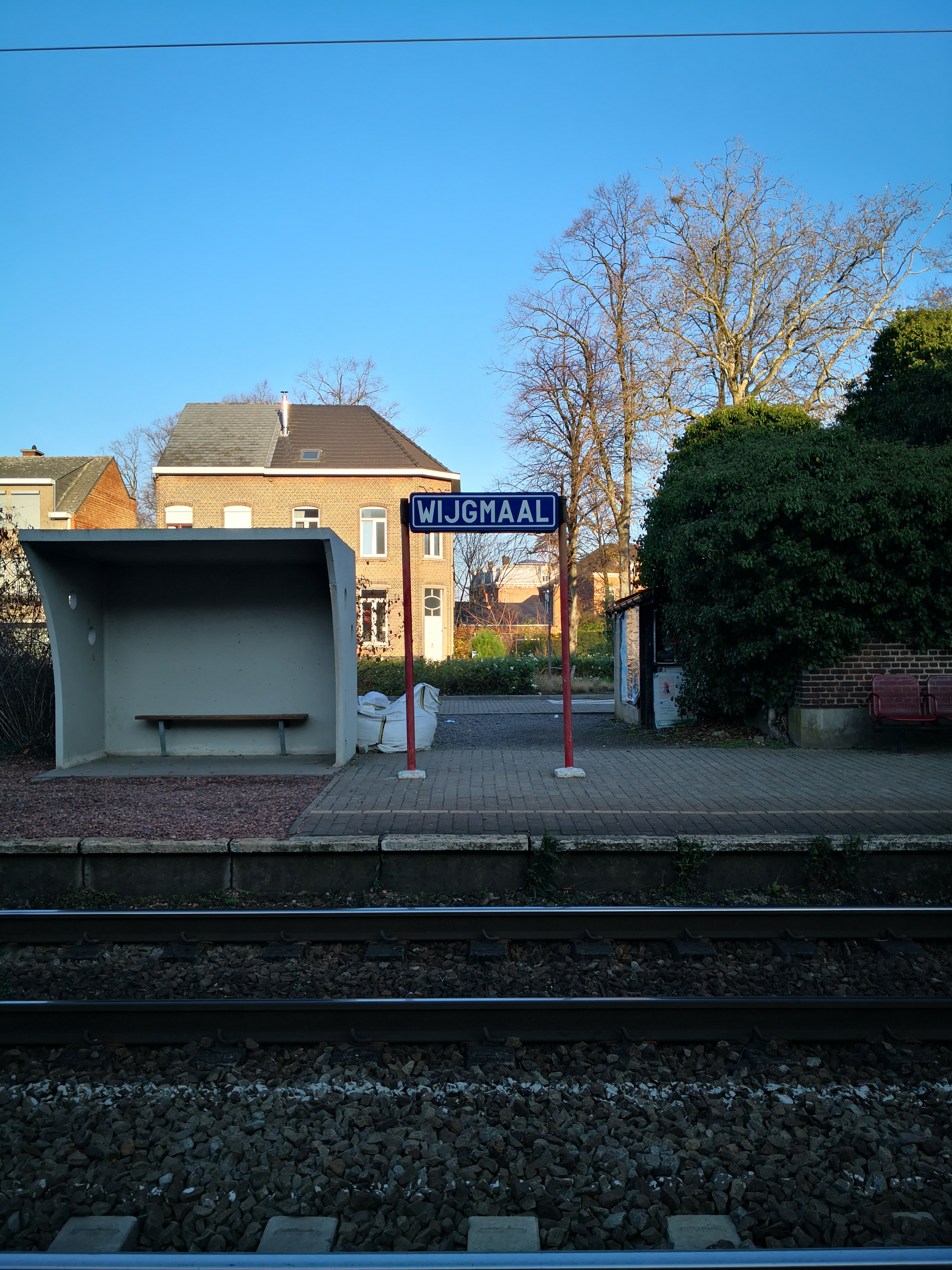
Passenger shelters.

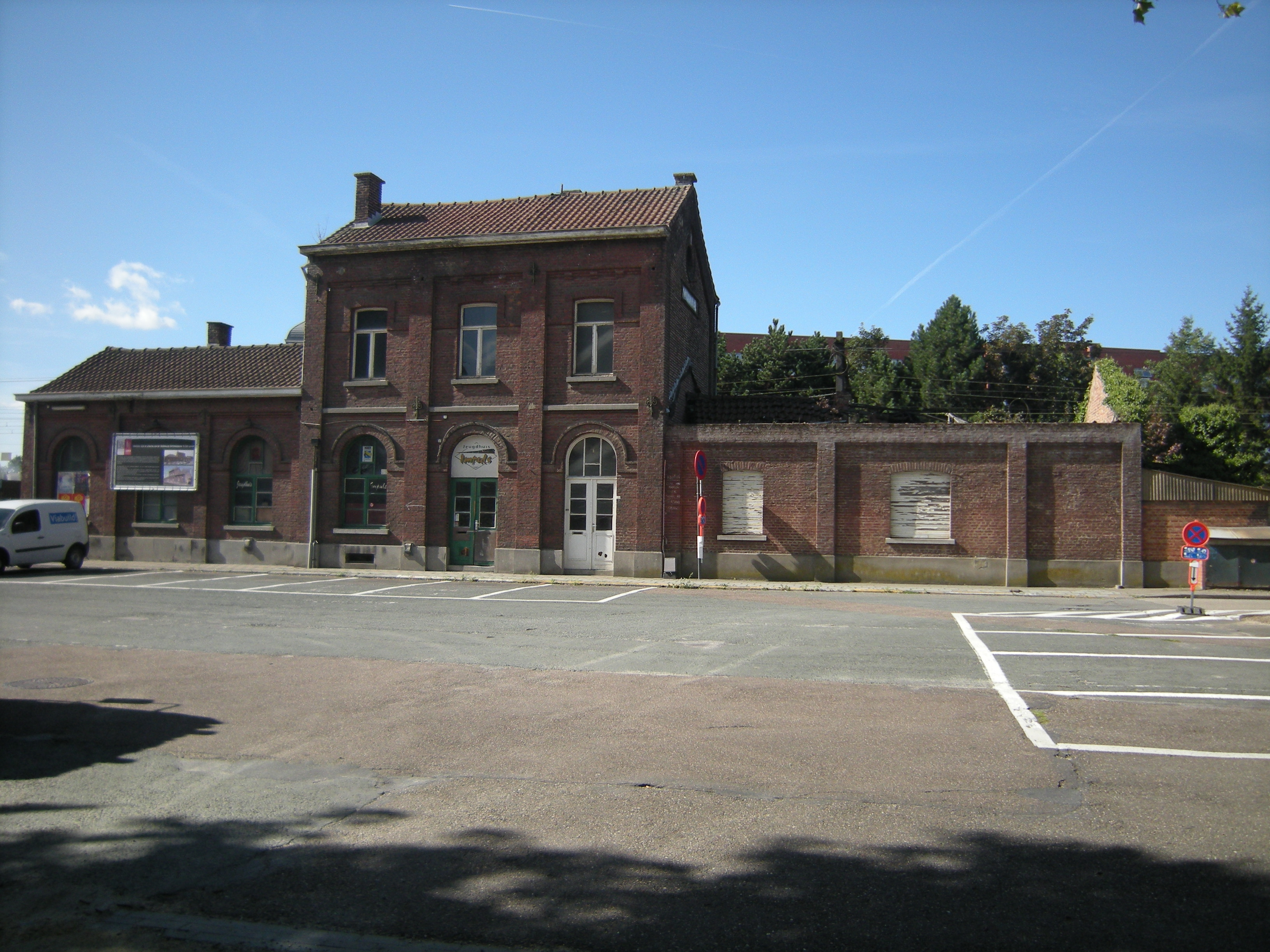
General view of the station

== See also ==
- List of Belgian railway services
- Rail transport in Belgium
