= Tongeren railway station =

Railway station in Limburg, Belgium

Tongeren
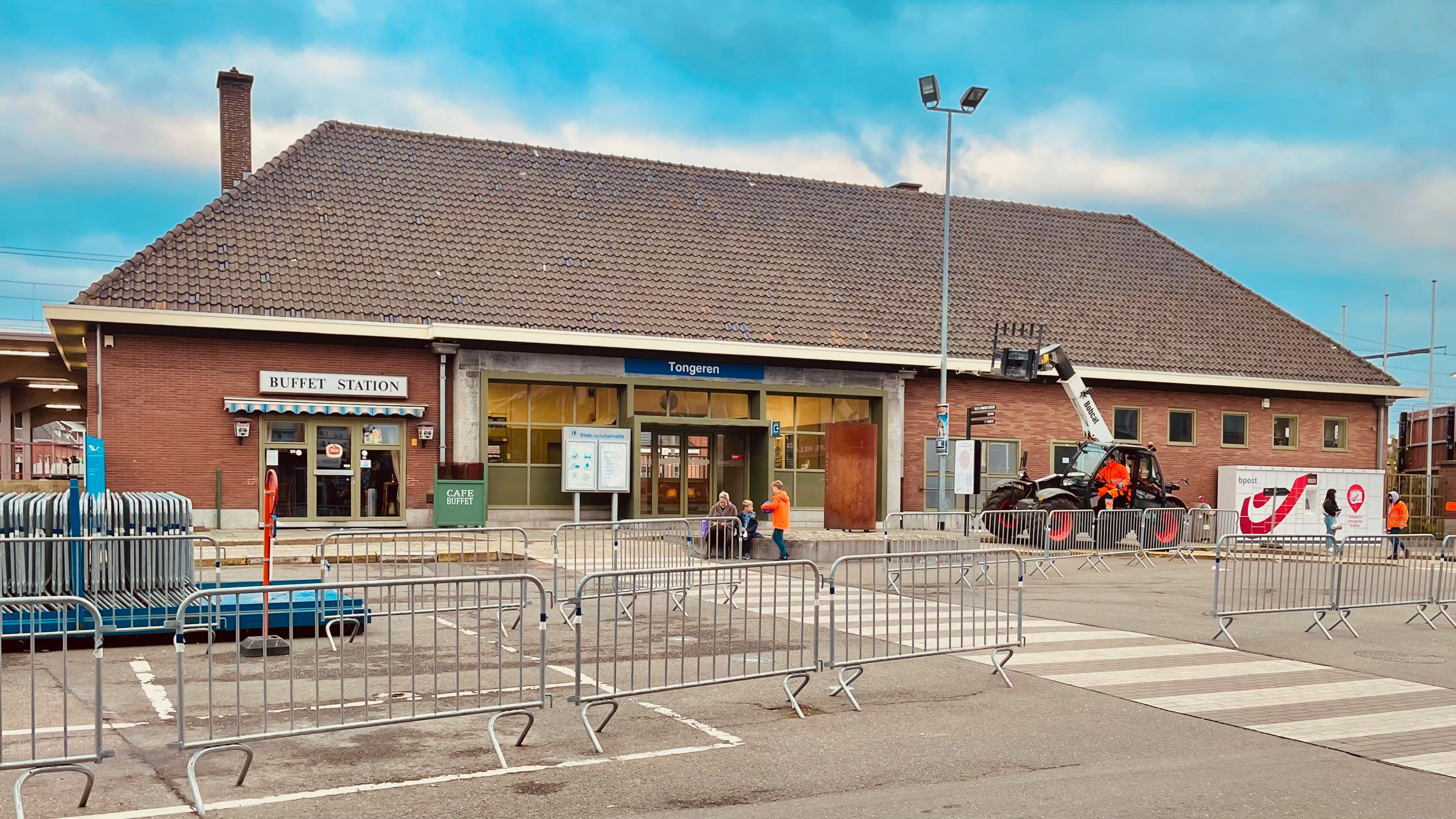
- Tongeren railway station

General information
- Location: Tongeren, Limburg; Belgium
- Coordinates: 50°47′2″N 5°28′24″E
- System: Railway Station
- Owner: NMBS/SNCB
- Operator: NMBS/SNCB
- Line: 24 - 34
- Platforms: 3
- Tracks: 5

Other information
- Station code: FTG

History
- Opened: 11 November 1863; 162 years ago

Services
Preceding station	NMBS/SNCB	Following station
Bilzen towards Gent-Sint-Pieters	IC 20	Terminus
Bilzen towards Hasselt	IC 13	Glons towards Maastricht
Bilzen towards Antwerpen-Centraal	IC 09 weekends	Glons towards Liège-Guillemins
Location
- Location within Belgium Location within Europe

Tongeren railway station (Dutch: Station Tongeren; French: Gare de Tongres) (Note: Officially Tongeren (Dutch: Tongeren, French: Tongres)) is a railway station in Tongeren, Limburg, Belgium. The station is on the Hasselt-Liège railway and marks the beginning of the Tongeren-Aachen railway through Visé to Germany. The station was also the final stop of the now demolished Drieslinter-Tongeren railway. The train services are operated by the National Railway Company of Belgium (NMBS/SNCB).

== Signal box ==
Tongeren signal box used to be located in the station building. It was permanently staffed until the 1990s, since when the train traffic in and around Tongeren has been regulated from Bilzen. The Tongeren signal box remained in place, but was only in use in the event of faults or maintenance works. On 24 June 2016, it was finally closed at the same time as the Bilzen signal box. Since then, train traffic has been regulated from Hasselt's modern, central traffic control post.

The ticket office of the station is only open during the week, between 5:45 a.m. and 1 p.m.

== Services ==
=== Week ===
Train type	Connection	Timetable
IC 20	Tongeren - Hasselt - Aarschot - Brussel-South - Aalst - Gent-Sint-Pieters	1x per hour
IC 13	Hasselt - Diepenbeek - Tongeren - Liège-Guillemins - Maastricht	1x per hour

=== Weekend ===
Train type	Connection	Timetable
IC 09	Antwerpen-Centraal - Aarschot - Hasselt - Diepenbeek - Tongeren - Liège-Guillemins	1x per hour

== Gallery ==
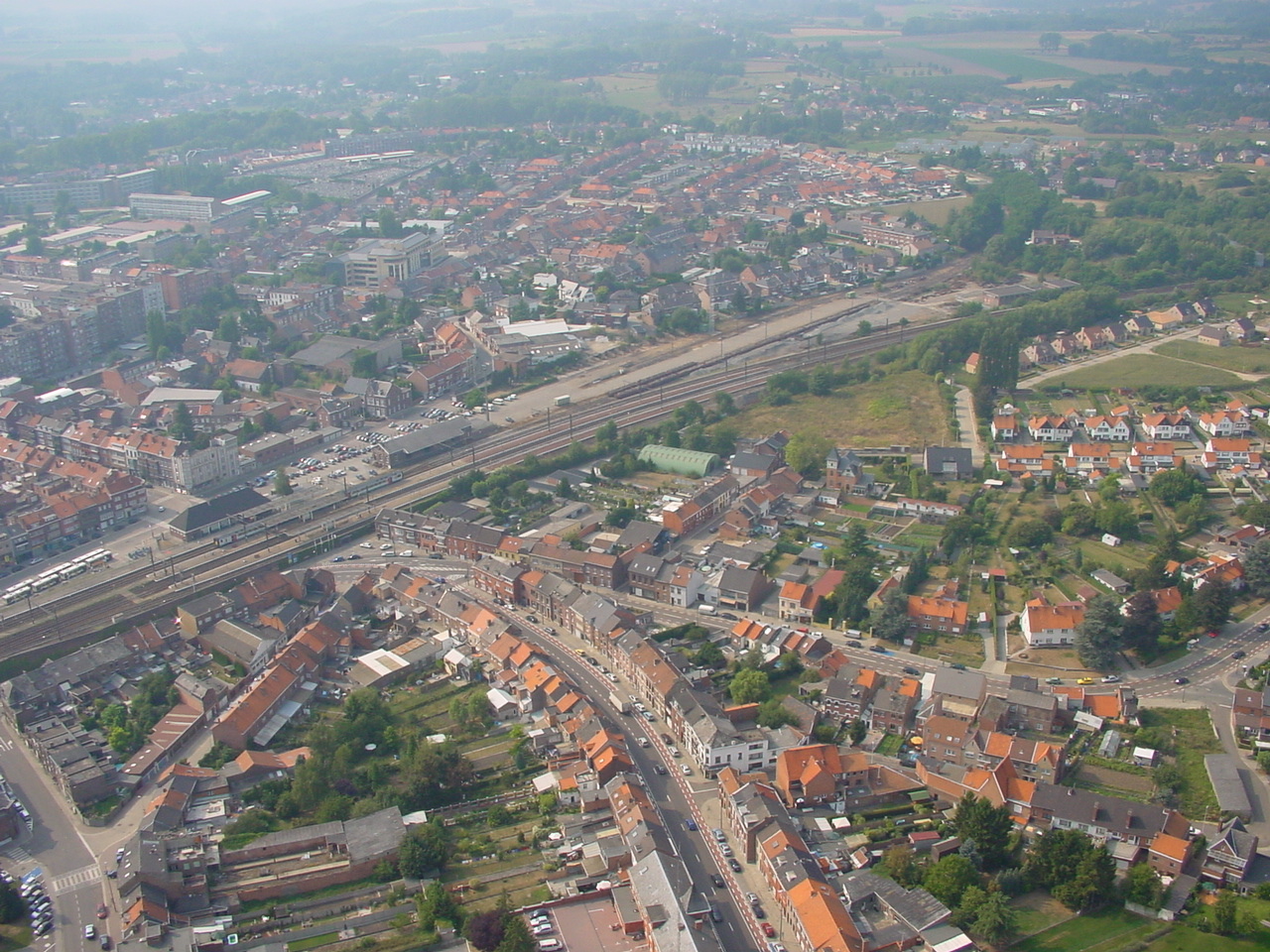
Tongeren railway station from a bird's eye view

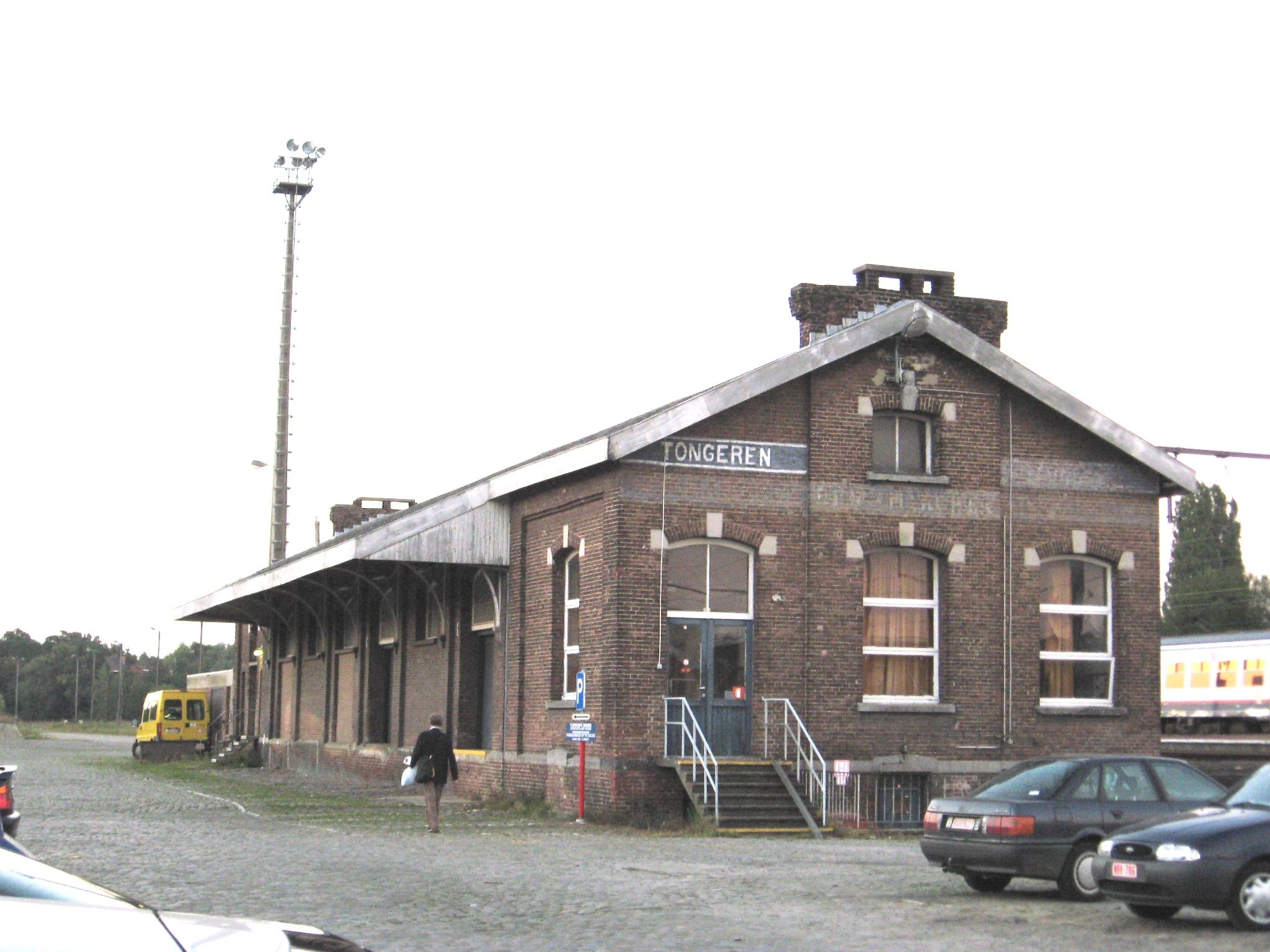
The freight station building

== See also ==
- List of railway stations in Belgium
- Rail transport in Belgium
