= Hasselt railway station =

Railway station in Limburg, Belgium

Hasselt
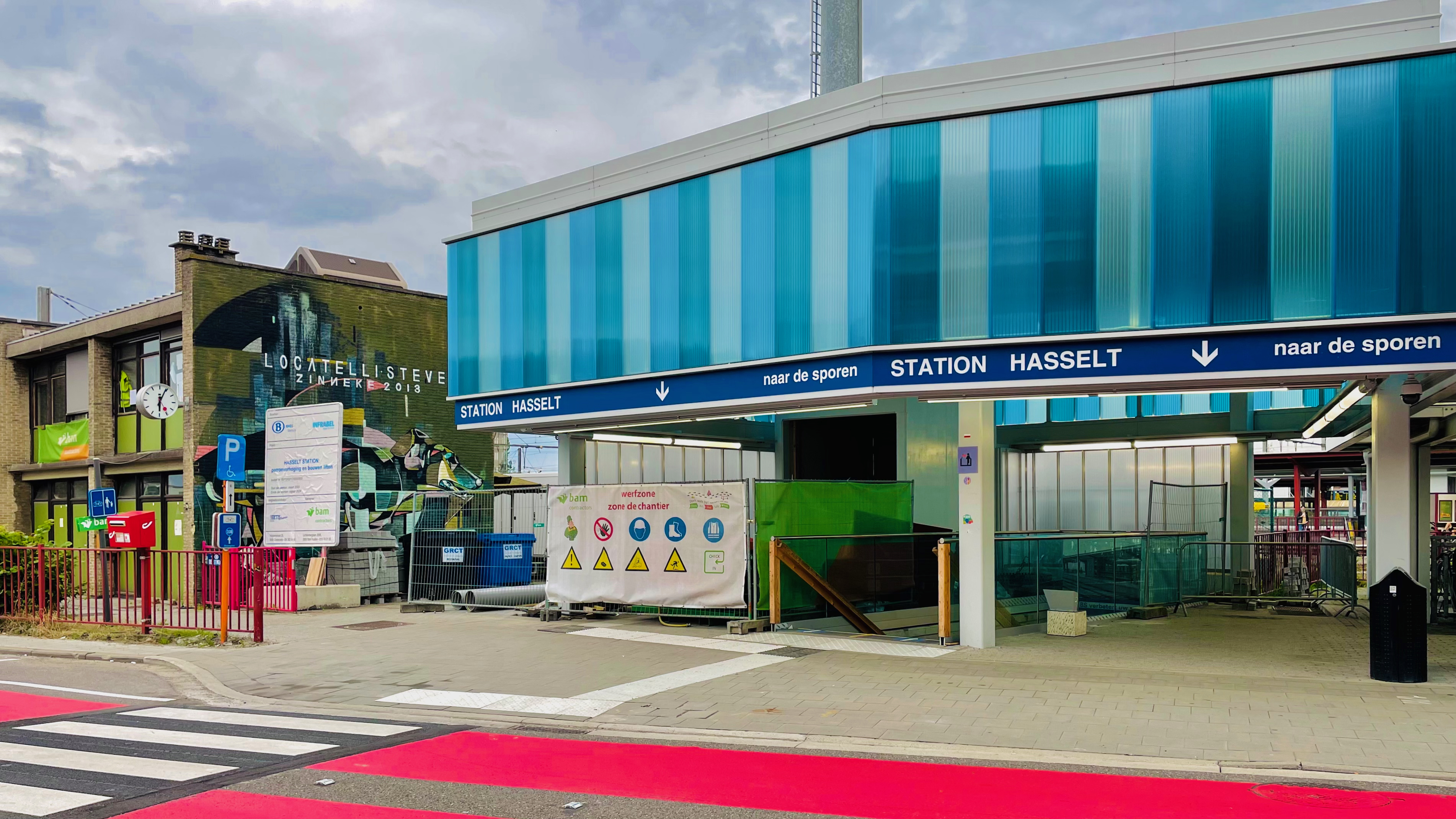
- Hasselt railway station

General information
- Location: Hasselt, Limburg; Belgium
- Coordinates: 50°55′52″N 5°19′41″E
- System: Railway Station
- Owner: NMBS/SNCB
- Operator: NMBS/SNCB
- Lines: 15, 21, 21A, 34 and 35
- Platforms: 5
- Tracks: 9

Other information
- Station code: FHS

History
- Opened: 8 December 1847; 178 years ago

Passengers
- 2009: 5,865 per day
Location
- Location within Belgium Location within Europe

Hasselt railway station (Dutch: Station Hasselt; French: Gare d'Hasselt) (Note: Officially Hasselt) is a railway station in Hasselt, Limburg, Belgium. The station opened on 24 October 1843 and it is located at 21 Stationsplein (Station Square). It is served by railway lines 15, 21, 21A, 34 and 35. The train services are operated by the National Railway Company of Belgium (NMBS/SNCB).

== Train services ==
The station is served by the following services:

- Intercity services (IC-03) Knokke/Blankenberge - Bruges - Ghent - Brussels - Leuven - Hasselt - Genk
- Intercity services (IC-08) Antwerp - Mechelen - Brussels Airport - Leuven - Hasselt
- Intercity services (IC-09) Antwerp - Lier - Aarschot - Hasselt - Liège (weekends)
- Intercity services (IC-10) Antwerp - Mol - Hasselt
- Intercity services (IC-13) Hasselt - Liers - Liège - Visè - Maastricht (weekdays)
- Intercity services (IC-20) Ghent - Aalst - Brussels - Hasselt - Tongeren (weekdays)
- Local services (L-03) Leuven - Aarschot - Diest - Hasselt

Preceding station	NMBS/SNCB	Following station
Alken towards Blankenberge or Knokke	IC 03	Kiewit towards Genk
Schulen towards Antwerpen-Centraal	IC 08	Terminus
Diest towards Antwerpen-Centraal	IC 09 weekends	Diepenbeek towards Liège-Guillemins
Zonhoven towards Antwerpen-Centraal	IC 10	Terminus
Terminus	IC 13 weekdays	Diepenbeek towards Maastricht
Diest towards Gent-Sint-Pieters	IC 20 weekdays	Diepenbeek towards Tongeren
Schulen towards Leuven	L 03 weekdays	Terminus

== See also ==
- List of railway stations in Belgium
- Rail transport in Belgium
