= Landen railway station =

Railway station in Flemish Brabant, Belgium

Landen
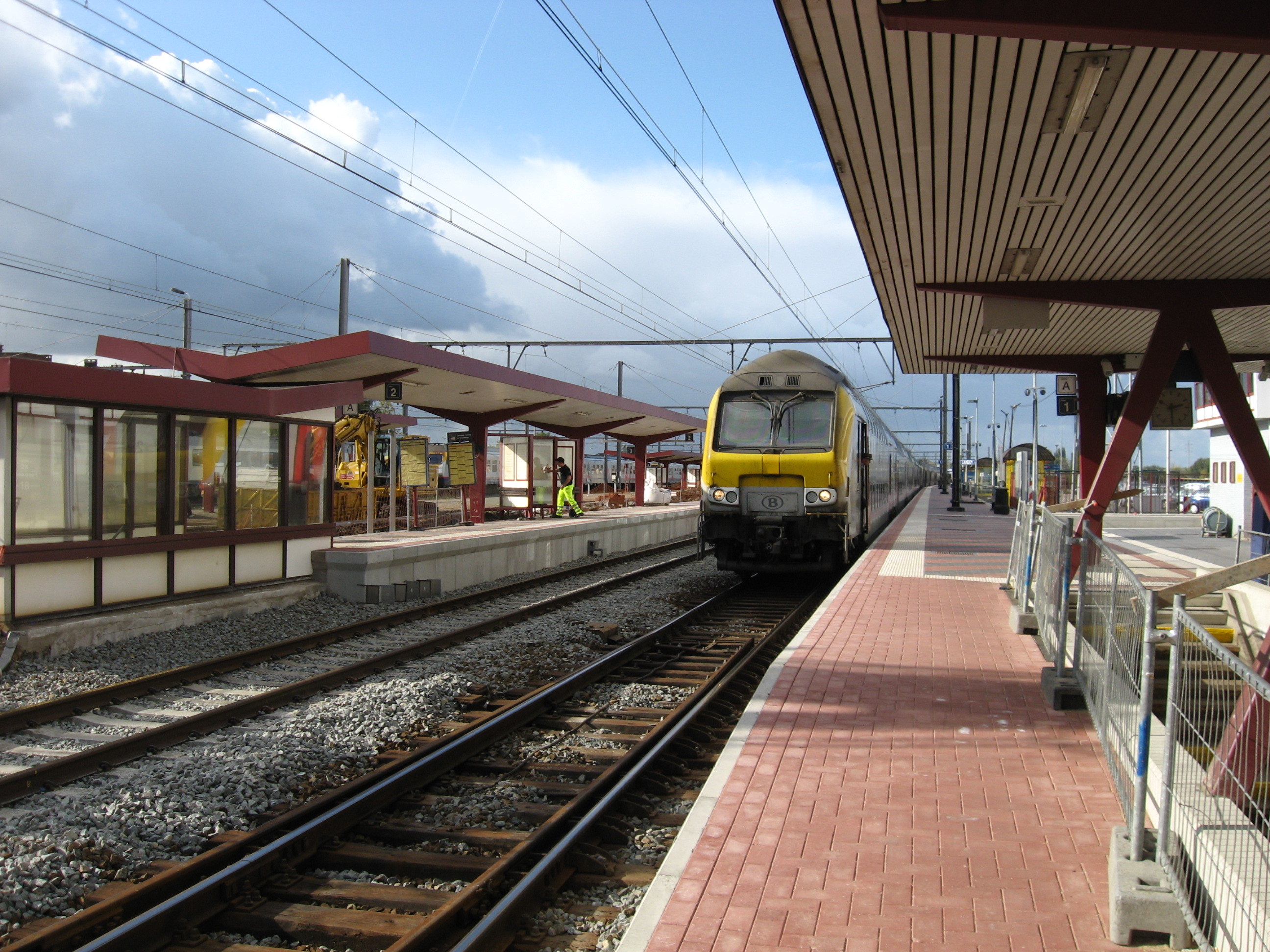
- Landen railway station

General information
- Location: Landen, Flemish Brabant; Belgium
- Coordinates: 50°44′52″N 5°04′46″E
- System: Railway Station
- Owner: Infrabel
- Operator: National Railway Company of Belgium
- Lines: 21 (Landen-Hasselt); 36 (Brussels-Liège)
- Platforms: 5

Other information
- Station code: FLD
- Website: http://www.belgianrail.be/en/stations-and-train/search-a-station/4/landen.aspx

History
- Opened: 2 April 1838; 188 years ago

Passengers
- 2014: 2,994
Location
- Location within Belgium

Landen is a railway station in the town of Landen, Flemish Brabant, Belgium. The station opened on 2 April 1838 and is located on lines 21 and 36. The train services are operated by National Railway Company of Belgium (NMBS).

Landen used to be located on 127 (to Statte) and 147 (to Tamines).

On 19 February 2016 a train ran away from a platform at Landen railway station after the driver left the cabin to inspect the train's mechanics. The train started moving in the direction of Tienen railway station and was stopped 30 minutes and 12 km later by a driver who jumped in the train's cab. No passengers were on the train during the incident.

== Train services ==
The station is served by the following services:

- Intercity services (IC-03) Blankenberge - Bruges - Ghent - Brussels - Leuven - Hasselt - Genk
- Intercity services (IC-14) Quiévrain - Mons - Braine-le-Comte - Brussels - Leuven - Liege (weekdays)
- Intercity services (IC-29) De Panne - Ghent - Aalst - Brussels - Brussels Airport - Leuven - Landen
- Local services (L-21) Landen - Waremme - Liege (weekends)

Preceding station	NMBS/SNCB	Following station
Tienen towards Blankenberge or Knokke	IC 03	Sint-Truiden towards Genk
Tienen towards Quiévrain	IC 14 weekdays	Waremme towards Liège-Guillemins
Neerwinden towards De Panne	IC 29	Terminus
Terminus	L 21 weekends	Waremme towards Liège-Guillemins
