= 1989 UCI Road World Championships – Women's team time trial =

Women's team time trial
1989 UCI Road World Championships

Race details
- Dates: 23 August 1989
- Stages: 1
- Distance: 50.9 km (31.6 mi)
- Winning time: 1h 08' 05"02

Medalists
	Gold	Soviet Union
	Silver	Italy
	Bronze	France

The women's team time trial of the 1989 UCI Road World Championships cycling event took place on 23 August 1989 in Chambéry, France. The course was 50.9 km long and went from Chambéry to Le Touvet and back to Chambéry.

== Final classification ==
Rank	Country	Riders	Time
1st place, gold medalist(s)	Soviet Union	Nadezhda Kibardina Natalya Melyokhina; Tamara Poliakova; Laima Zilporite	1h 08' 05"02
2nd place, silver medalist(s)	Italy	Monica Bandini Roberta Bonanomi; Maria Canins; Franscesca Galli	1h 08' 05"89
3rd place, bronze medalist(s)	France	Nathalie Cantet Catherine Marsal; Cécile Odin; Valérie Simonnet	1h 08' 35"
4	Netherlands	Monique Knol Monique De Bruin; Cora Westland; Menny Top	1h 08' 37"
5	United States	Elisabeth Davis Margaret Maass; Linda Brenneman; Maureen Manley	1h 09' 42"
6	West Germany	Viola Paulitz Jutta Niehaus; Stefanie Halbach; Ruth Schmid	1h 09' 50"
7	Sweden	Marion Levin Helena Normann; Paula Westher; Christina Vosveld	1h 10' 03"
8	Switzerland	Luzia Zberg Edith Schönenberger; Evelyne Müller; Brigitte Gyr	1h 10' 19"
9	Canada	Sara Neil Kelly Ann Way; Alison Sydor; Denise Kelly	1h 12' 06"
10	Belgium	Nele D'Haene Els Mertens; Heidi Van De Vijver; Sylvie Slos	1h 12' 38"
11	Norway	Astrid Danielsen Inguun Bollerud; Wencke Jansen; May Britt Valand	1h 12' 43"
12	East Germany	Petra Rössner Angela Ranft; Angela Kindling; Katja Kamratowsky	1h 13' 01"
13	Denmark	Karina Skibby Hanne Malmberg; Hanne Rasmussen; Merete Andersen	1h 13' 04"
14	Hungary	Molnar Pinterne Marta Seregely; Eva Izsak; Emese Szalay	1h 16' 20"
15	South Korea	Yung Mi Hong Yung Mwa Kim; Yung Sin Kim; Eun Ja So	1h 16' 55"
