= 1987 UCI Road World Championships – Women's team time trial =

Women's team time trial
1987 UCI Road World Championships

Race details
- Dates: 1 September 1987
- Stages: 1
- Distance: 50 km (31 mi)
- Winning time: 1h 05' 53"

Medalists
	Gold	Soviet Union
	Silver	United States
	Bronze	Italy

The women's team time trial of the 1987 UCI Road World Championships cycling event took place on 1 September 1987 in Villach, Austria.

== Final classification ==
Rank	Country	Riders	Time
1st place, gold medalist(s)	Soviet Union	Nadezhda Kibardina Tamara Poliakova; Lyubov Pugovichnikova; Alla Yakovleva	1h 05' 53"
2nd place, silver medalist(s)	United States	Sue Ehlers Jane Marshall; Leslie Schenk; Inga Thompson	1h 05' 58"
3rd place, bronze medalist(s)	Italy	Monica Bandini Roberta Bonanomi; Imelda Chiappa; Fransesca Galli	1h 06' 42"
4	Netherlands	Mieke Havik Heleen Hage; Petra de Bruin; Thea van Rijnsoever	1h 08' 06"
5	Sweden	Marion Levin Helena Normann; Paula Westher; Christina Vosveld	1h 08' 34"
6	Canada	Sara Neil Kelly Ann Way; Judy Latoski; Geneviève Brunet	1h 09' 09"
7	France	Dominique Damiani Valérie Simonnet; Cécile Odin; Virginie Lafargue	1h 09' 19"
8	Germany	Ines Varenkamp Ute Enzenauer; Jutta Niehaus; Heidi Matwew	1h 10' 25"
9	New Zealand	Sue Golder; Karen Holiday; Sarah Holland; Yvonne Sprey	1h 11' 14"
10	Australia	Elizabeth Hepple Robyn Battison; Donna Rae; Donna Gould	1h 11' 21"
11	Norway	Unni Larsen Tone Benjaminsen; Astrid Danielsen; Anita Valen	1h 11' 26"
12	Austria	Johanna Hack Christine Hager; Maria Handstanger; Edith Obersberger	1h 11' 35"
13	Denmark	Helle Sörensen Karina Skibby; Hanne Malmberg; Betina Falsing	1h 11' 45"
14	Belgium	Agnès Dusart Godelieve Janssens; Anne Barrie; Martine Schotte	1h 12' 36"
15	United Kingdom	Lisa Brambani Virginia Thomas; Claire Greenwood; Susan Thompson	1h 13' 13"
