= 1988 UCI Road World Championships – Women's team time trial =

Women's team time trial
1988 UCI Road World Championships

Race details
- Dates: 27 August 1988
- Stages: 1
- Distance: 54 km (34 mi)
- Winning time: 1h 19' 03"

Medalists
	Gold	Italy
	Silver	Soviet Union
	Bronze	United States

The women's team time trial of the 1988 UCI Road World Championships cycling event took place on 27 August 1988 in Renaix, Belgium.

== Final classification ==
Rank	Country	Riders	Time
1st place, gold medalist(s)	Italy	Monica Bandini Roberta Bonanomi; Maria Canins; Francesca Galli	1h 19' 03"
2nd place, silver medalist(s)	Soviet Union	Alla Yakovleva Nadezhda Kibardina; Svetlana Rozhkova; Laima Zilporite	1h 19' 43"
3rd place, bronze medalist(s)	United States	Jeanne Golay Phyllis Hines; Jane Marshall; Leslie Schenk	1h 20' 38"
4	West Germany	Ines Varenkamp Sandra Schumacher; Jutta Niehaus; Viola Paulitz	1h 20' 48"
5	Belgium	Agnès Dusart Els Mertens; Sylvie Slos; Kristel Werckx	1h 22' 05"
6	Canada	Kelly Ann Way Alison Sydor; Denise Kelly; Laural Zilke	1h 22' 15"
7	Sweden	Helena Normann Paula Westher; Christina Vosveld; Maria Höljer	1h 23' 10"
8	Netherlands	Heleen Hage Monique Knol; Karin Schuitema; Cora Westland	1h 24' 17"
9	Czechoslovakia	Radka Kynclova Martina Navratilova; Ildiko Paczova; Jarmila Snahnicanova	1h 24' 19"
10	Denmark	Hanne Malmberg Hanne Rasmussen; Lona Munck; Helle Sörensen	1h 24' 30"
11	Norway	Tone Benjaminsen Astrid Danielsen; Wencke Jansen; May Britt Valand	1h 24' 53"
12	United Kingdom	Lisa Brambani Claire Greenwood; Maria Blower; Judith Painter	1h 26' 12"
13	France	Jeannie Longo Catherine Marsal; Cécile Odin; Anny Rebière	1h 27' 45"
