= Park and ride railway station =

A park and ride railway station is a railway station designed to be used for park and ride.

== In Belgium ==
Noorderkempen railway station in Brecht, opened in 2009 on the HSL 4 high-speed line, functions as a park and ride for Antwerp and to a lesser extent Breda.

== In New Zealand ==
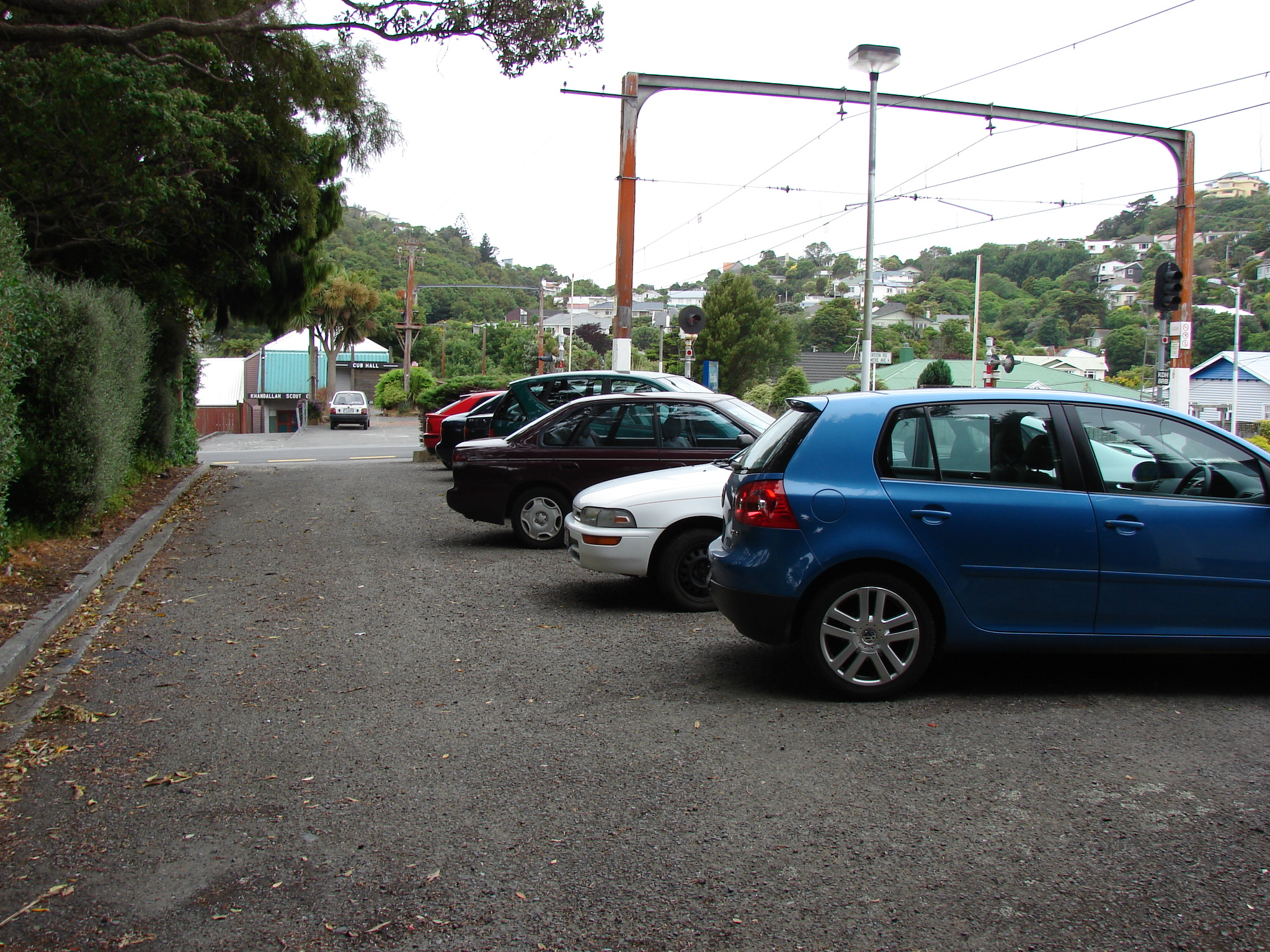
Khandallah railway station in Wellington; car park.

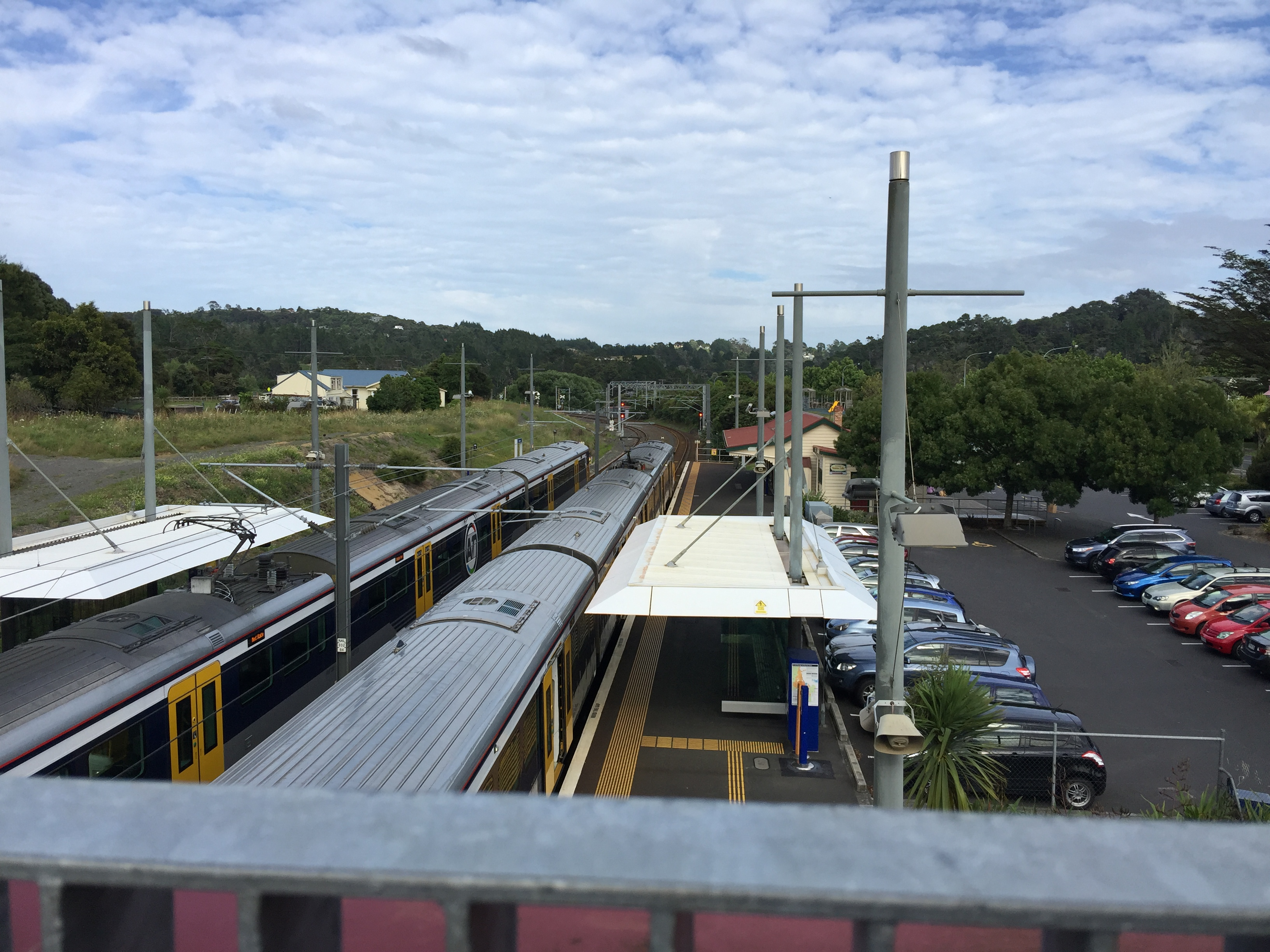
Swanson railway station in Auckland; car park.

In New Zealand, Auckland and Wellington have extensive electrified suburban networks; see Public transport in the Wellington Region (Khandallah railway station right) and Public transport in Auckland (Swanson railway station below). Many suburban stations have park and ride facilities.

== In the United Kingdom ==
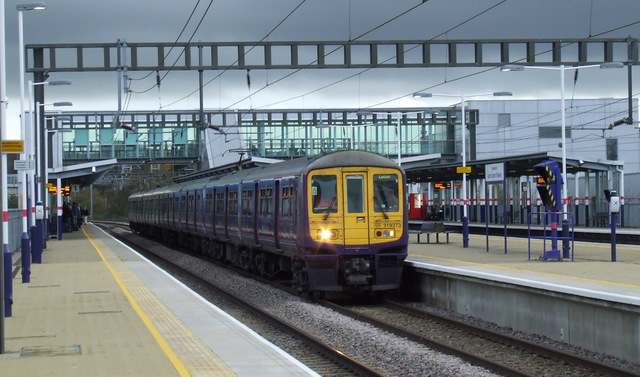
Luton Airport Parkway railway station

Several mainly park-and-ride-status railway stations in England have the suffix "parkway" in their name. The etymology is from the original U.S. meaning as the Bristol Parkway railway station was named after the adjacent M32 motorway, originally known as The Parkway because of its green-buffered route into the city. Bristol Parkway was the first railway station so named, in 1972. The majority of such stations were opened in the late 20th century to relieve pressure on existing city centre stations. Examples such as Didcot Parkway are renamings following the expansion of the car parking facilities where the name is used promotionally (for example commuters to Oxford are encouraged to leave their car at Didcot and travel to Oxford by train) whereas in others with multi-storey car parks serving modest settlements such as Brookwood and Fleet the suffix has not been adopted.

Luton Airport Parkway and Southampton Airport Parkway are examples serving Luton and Southampton airports. Some were so named as they are not in easy walking distance of an airport terminal; passengers use shuttle bus services. Southampton Airport Parkway is within easy walking distance of Southampton Airport. It has extensive car parking of its own, intended for use by commuters rather than users of the airport.

== In the United States ==
In the United States, it is common for outlying rail stations to include automobile parking, often with hundreds of spaces. Boston, for example, has built several large parking facilities at its commuter rail and metro stations near major highways and large arterial surface roads around the periphery of the city: Alewife, Braintree, Forest Hills, Hyde Park, Quincy Adams, Riverside, Route 128, Wellington, Woburn. The local transit operator locally, the MBTA, offers 46,000 park and ride spaces.

NJ Transit also features multiple such stations, particularly those at Hamilton, Hoboken, Metropark, Secaucus Junction, and Trenton.

== See also ==
- Coachway interchange: a similar concept for long-distance coach travel
