= Gracia–Orlová =

Czech multi-day road cycling race

Race details
- Date: 1. 5. - 4. 5. 2025
- Region: Czech Republic
- Type: Stage race
- Web site: www.graciaorlova.cz

History
- First edition: 1987
- Editions: 37 (as of 2025)
- First winner: Angela Ranft (GDR)
- Most wins: Hanka Kupfernagel (GER) (5 wins)
- Most recent: Marta Bastianelli (ITA)

Gracia–Orlová is a women's staged cycle race which takes place in the Moravian-Silesian Region of the Czech Republic and in the Silesian Voivodeship of Poland. It was created in 1987.

== Honours ==
Year	Winner	Second	Third
1987	(East Germany) Angela Ranft	(East Germany) Petra Rossner	(East Germany) Kerstin Arndt
1988	(Czechoslovakia) Radka Kynčlová	(East Germany) Petra Rossner	(East Germany) Angela Kindling
1989	(East Germany) Angela Ranft	(Czechoslovakia) Ildikó Páczová	(Czechoslovakia) Radka Kynčlová
1990	(Czechoslovakia) Radka Kynčlová	(Czechoslovakia) Eva Orvošová	(Czechoslovakia) Jana Poloková
1991	(Czechoslovakia) Ildikó Páczová	(Czechoslovakia) Eva Orvošová	(Czechoslovakia) Alena Barillová
1992	(Russia) Valentina Gerasimova	(Ukraine) Marina Proudnikova	(Russia) Elena Ogouy
1993	(Lithuania) Rasa Polikevičiūtė	(Russia) Aleksandra Koliaseva	(Ukraine) Tamara Polyakova
1994	(Russia) Gulnara Fatkulina	(Russia) Svetlana Samokhvalova	(Russia) Olga Sokolova
1995	(Germany) Hanka Kupfernagel	(Germany) Judith Arndt	(Russia) Valentina Gerasimova
1996	(Germany) Hanka Kupfernagel	(Slovenia) Lenka Ilavská	(Switzerland) Barbara Heeb
1997	(Germany) Hanka Kupfernagel	(Switzerland) Barbara Heeb	(Russia) Zulfiya Zabirova
1998	(Switzerland) Marcia Vouets-Eicher	(Australia) Kathryn Watt	(Slovakia) Lenka Ilavská
1999	(Germany) Hanka Kupfernagel	(Ukraine) Tetyana Styazhkina	(Ukraine) Ioulia Mourenkaia
2000	(Germany) Hanka Kupfernagel	(Netherlands) Meike de Bruijn	(Norway) Monica Valen
2001	(Germany) Judith Arndt	(Switzerland) Nicole Brändli	(United States) Lara Ruthven
2002	(United States) Amber Neben	(Germany) Hanka Kupfernagel	(Switzerland) Priska Doppmann
2003	(Switzerland) Nicole Brändli	(Germany) Judith Arndt	(Czech Republic) Lada Kozlíková
2004	(Switzerland) Nicole Brändli	(Switzerland) Annette Beutler	(Switzerland) Karin Thürig
2005	(Germany) Judith Arndt	(Sweden) Susanne Ljungskog	(Germany) Madeleine Sandig
2006	(Germany) Judith Arndt	(United States) Amber Neben	(Switzerland) Nicole Brändli
2007	(Germany) Judith Arndt	(Russia) Alexandra Burchenkova	(Netherlands) Andrea Bosman
2008	(Netherlands) Marianne Vos	(Germany) Luise Keller	(Russia) Alexandra Burchenkova
2009	(Germany) Trixi Worrack	(Italy) Fabiana Luperini	(Netherlands) Marianne Vos
2010	(Netherlands) Marianne Vos	(Netherlands) Annemiek van Vleuten	(United Kingdom) Nicole Cooke
2011	(Russia) Tatiana Antoshina	(Russia) Natalia Boyarskaya	(Russia) Svetlana Bubnenkova
2012	(United States) Evelyn Stevens	(Germany) Trixi Worrack	(United Kingdom) Sharon Laws
2013	(Netherlands) Ellen van Dijk	(United States) Evelyn Stevens	(United Kingdom) Emma Pooley
2014	(Poland) Paulina Brzeźna-Bentkowska	(Australia) Katrin Garfoot	(Poland) Eugenia Bujak
2015	(Belarus) Alena Amialiusik	(Germany) Trixi Worrack	(Poland) Eugenia Bujak
2016	(Azerbaijan) Olena Pavlukhina	(Australia) Shara Gillow	(Belarus) Alena Amialiusik
2017	(Netherlands) Riejanne Markus	(Netherlands) Anouska Koster	(Netherlands) Moniek Tenniglo
2018	(Sweden) Emilia Fahlin	(Russia) Olga Zabelinskaya	(Russia) Maria Novolodskaya
2019	(Italy) Marta Bastianelli	(Belgium) Julie Van de Velde	(Russia) Maria Novolodskaya
2022	(Poland) Agnieszka Skalniak-Sójka	(Sweden) Jenny Rissveds	(Austria) Christina Schweinberger
2023	(Sweden) Jenny Rissveds	(Poland) Dominika Włodarczyk	(Sweden) Emilia Fahlin
2024	(Germany) Corinna Lechner	(Netherlands) Mirre Knaven	(Slovenia) Urška Žigart
2025	(Canada) Alison Jackson	(Switzerland) Jasmin Liechti	(Poland) Karolina Kumiega

== Jerseys ==
As of the 2013 edition:

denotes the rider leading the race overall
denotes the rider leading the Points classification
denotes the rider leading the Mountains classification
denotes the rider leading the Sprints classification
