= NS International =

Dutch railway company

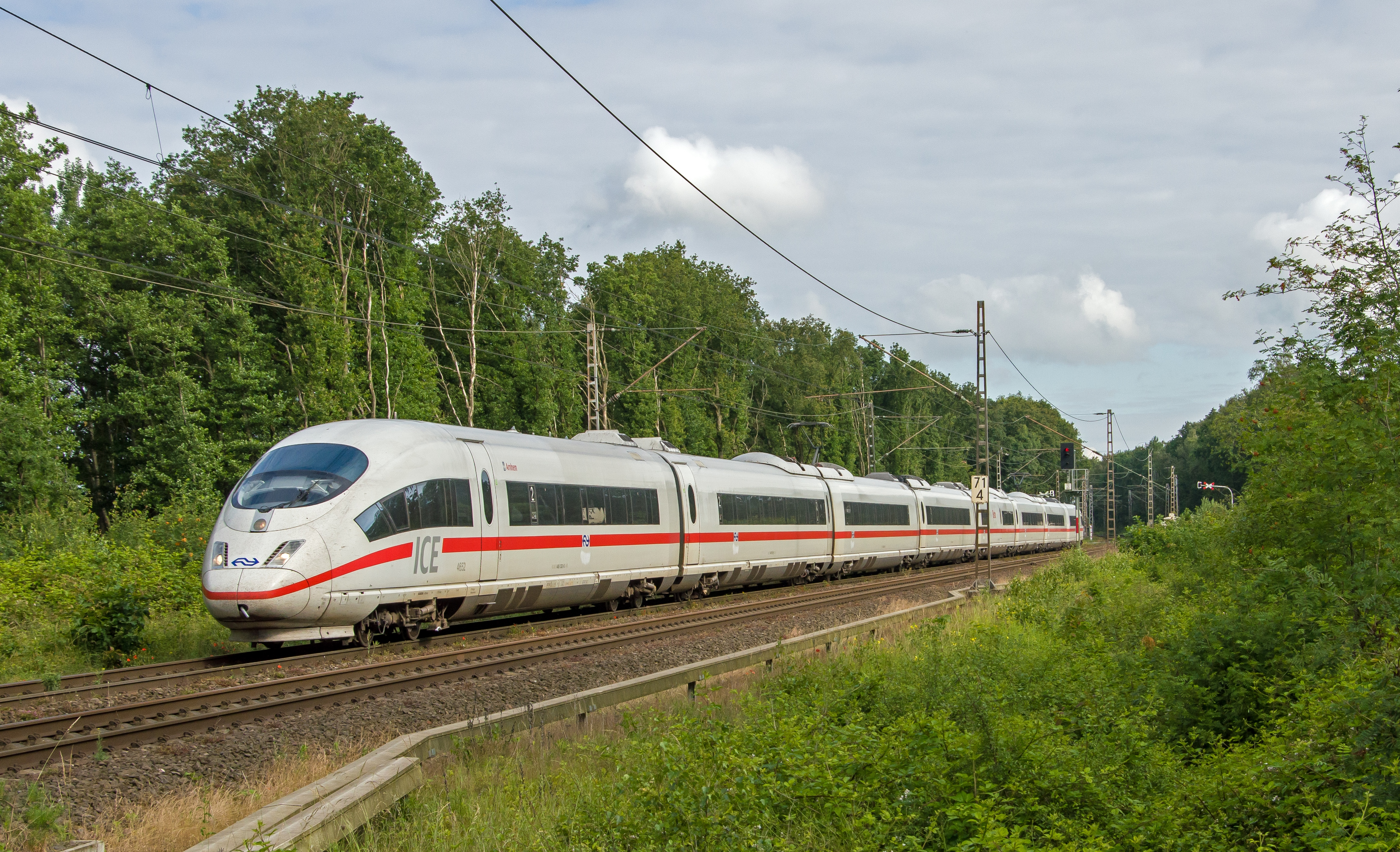
- NS International's ICE 3

Overview
- Main regions: Belgium, France, Germany, Netherlands, Switzerland and the United Kingdom
- Parent company: Nederlandse Spoorwegen
- Headquarters: Amsterdam
- Dates of operation: 15 June 2014–

Technical
- Length: 426 km (265 mi)

Other
- Website: www.nsinternational.com

NS International, formerly NS Hispeed, is a passenger railway operator based in the Netherlands that operates international intercity and high-speed connections to several European cities. It is a subsidiary of the Dutch state-owned railway operator Nederlandse Spoorwegen (NS).

== History ==
During 2007, the former international subdivision of the Dutch state-owned railway operator Nederlandse Spoorwegen (NS), NS Internationaal, was reorganised and rebranded as NS Hispeed. Orientated on providing international passenger services between the Netherlands and neighbouring European countries, it promptly became a founding member of the Railteam alliance, with a 10% share in the group.

To facilitate the operation of high speed services, NS Hispeed proceeded with the procurement of new suitable rolling stock. In 2004, NS International and NMBS/SNCB had jointly ordered 19 V250 train sets from the Italian rolling stock manufacturer AnsaldoBreda for operations between Amsterdam and Brussels and Breda on the HSL-Zuid and HSL 4 high speed railway lines. However, difficulties with the order soon became apparent; the initial delivery date was scheduled to take place in 2007 By 2008, deliveries were not anticipated until early 2009, while the introduction into service date was pushed back to the middle of 2009. NS Hispeed claimed that the delay was primarily due to the lack of a formal ETCS level 2 specification; financial assistance in the form of reorganised track access charges for the unused HSL-Zuid line had to be arranged with the Dutch government.

On 7 July 2009, the new high speed service, branded Fyra, was introduced along with the formal presentation of the prototype V250 train at the high speed train depot at Watergraafsmeer in the Netherlands. However, by this point the expected in-service date has been pushed back to Autumn 2010. In July 2010, the Dutch transport minister Camiel Eurlings stated that the commencement of commercial V250 services on Dutch high speed lines would not take place until December 2011. It would not be until September 2012 - roughly five years later than planned, - that a limited service of one return train per three hours in the Netherlands began in September 2012 between Amsterdam and Rotterdam.

The operations of the V250 fleet would be relatively brief as, during January 2013, it was removed from service due to numerous technical issues pertaining to both reliability and safety in low temperature conditions. Belgian authorities opted to revoke the V250's operating certification in Belgium after a floor plate that had fallen off a V250 was discovered. Four months later, only two of the nine sets to have been delivered were reportedly capable of performing test runs. The continuous problems with the V250 caused a public outcry in both Belgium and the Netherlands, including accusations in the Belgian and Dutch media that only financial considerations were behind the decision to grant the contract to AnsaldoBreda over its competitors. On 3 June 2013, NS announced that it would terminate the Fyra project and return the V250 fleet to its manufacturer. On 17 March 2014, NS announced a settlement with AnsaldoBreda had been reached under which the trainsets would be returned for a refund of €125 million, €88m less than originally paid, while an additional compensation for each unit, up to a maximum of €21m, would be issued if resold.

During June 2014, the company's name was changed to NS International; this rebranding came in parallel to the transfer of the operations of the HSL-Zuid high speed line from NS Hispeed to NS Reizigers. Some industry commentators saw this as a measure by the organisation to distance itself from the negative reputation garnered from the V250 controversy.

In September 2013, it was announced an agreement with the Dutch government, the international train operator Eurostar, and NS International has been reached for the provision of twice daily services between London and Amsterdam Centraal. The initial launch date was December 2016. The service would use newly purchased rolling stock and also call at Brussels, and Rotterdam. Initially, trains would stop in Brussels for about half an hour to allow domestic passengers from Amsterdam and Rotterdam to leave, a security sweep performed, and then permit London bound passengers to board. In November 2014, Eurostar announced the Amsterdam service's launch had been pushed back to "2016–2017" and that it would include a stop at Schiphol Airport; Eurostar indicated that the calling pattern was "not set in stone" and if a business case supported it the service might be extended to additional cities such as Utrecht. Fare prices were reported to start at £35 for a single ticket. The first regular service to Amsterdam left London St Pancras International at 08:31 on 4 April 2018; services on the route were quickly expanded over the following years. The direct Amsterdam to London service launched on 26 October 2020 with two trains per day on weekdays.

Former NS Hispeed logo

In August 2019, it was reported that NS international's various services had been cumulatively used by 917,000 passengers over the previous three months, representing a 13 percent increase over the year prior. The increased ridership was attributed to shorter journey times and increased service frequency, particularly on the route to Berlin, which saw the largest increase in passenger volume at 19 percent. One month later, the Dutch flagcarrier KLM announced that it would replace all flights on its Brussels-Amsterdam route with high speed trains that it claimed would equal airliners in speed, comfort, and capacity. During October 2021, the Dutch Ministry of Infrastructure and Water Management stated that it would permit greater competition on the nation's international lines to Brussels, Paris, London, Berlin, and Basel, in competition with NS International's services. This extended to international night train services, which the Dutch government was also reportedly considering granting on a fully open access basis between Amsterdam and Vienna. The plan was politically contentious due to the predicted economic consequences upon NS International.

NS International has responded to increased competition by reducing journey times on its existing services where feasible to do so. In September 2022, it was announced that NS International's Intercity service between Amsterdam and Berlin would benefit from increased speeds, cutting the journey time by 30 minutes by the end of 2023. The organisation has reportedly considered no longer accepting Interrail passes on some of its international services.

As of 2023, NS International is the Dutch partner of three high-speed international services: Eurostar, Thalys and ICE International. Although the rolling stock for these services are pooled, each partner has purchased and owns a number of units in each fleet. Accordingly, NS owns three ICE 3M EMUs used for the ICE services, and two PBKA EMUs operated by Thalys, all of which are quadricurrent.

== Services ==
The company operates, together with its partners, direct services to Belgium, France, Germany, Switzerland and the United Kingdom.

Type	Series	Partner	Route	Frequency	Notes
ICE	100 (ICE 43)	DB	Amsterdam Centraal - Utrecht Centraal - Arnhem Centraal - Oberhausen Hbf - Duisburg Hbf - Düsseldorf Hbf - Köln Hbf - Siegburg/Bonn - Frankfurt Flughafen - Mannheim Hbf - Karlsruhe Hbf - Offenburg - Freiburg Hbf - Basel Bad Bf - Basel SBB	1x per day	
ICE	120 (ICE 78)	DB	Amsterdam Centraal - Utrecht Centraal - Arnhem Centraal - Oberhausen Hbf - Duisburg Hbf - Düsseldorf Hbf - Köln Hbf - Frankfurt Flughafen - Frankfurt Hbf	5x per day	
Intercity	140 (IC 77)	DB	Amsterdam Centraal - Hilversum – Amersfoort Centraal - Apeldoorn – Deventer - Almelo - Hengelo - Bad Bentheim - Rheine - Osnabrück Hbf - Bad Oeynhausen/Bünde - Minden - Hannover Hbf - Wolfsburg Hbf - Stendal - Berlin-Spandau - Berlin Hbf - Berlin Ostbahnhof	5x per day to Berlin, 1x per day to Hannover, 1x per day to Bad Bentheim	
Intercity Direct	9200	NMBS	Amsterdam Centraal - Schiphol - Rotterdam Centraal - Breda - Noorderkempen - Antwerpen-Centraal - Antwerpen-Berchem - Mechelen - Brussels National Airport - Brussels-North - Brussel-Centraal - Brussel-Zuid/Midi	1x per hour	
Nightjet	NJ 421	ÖBB	Amsterdam Centraal - Utrecht Centraal - Arnhem Centraal - Düsseldorf HBF - Cologne HBF - Bonn HBF - Koblenz HBF - Mainz HBF - Frankfurt Flughafen - Frankfurt HBF - Würzburg HBF - Nürnberg HBF - Augsburg HBF - Munich HBF - Rosenheim HBF - Kufstein - Wörgl HBF - Jenbach - Innsbruck HBF	1x per day	Combined with NJ 40421 from Amsterdam - Nürnberg. Combined with NJ 40491 from Nürnberg - Innsbruck.
Nightjet	NJ 40421	ÖBB	Amsterdam Centraal - Utrecht Centraal - Arnhem Centraal - Düsseldorf HBF - Cologne HBF - Bonn HBF - Koblenz HBF - Mainz HBF - Frankfurt Flughafen - Frankfurt HBF - Würzburg HBF - Nürnberg HBF - Regensburg HBF - Passau HBF - Wels HBF - Linz HBF - Amstetten NÖ - St.Pölten HBF - Vienna Meidling - Vienna HBF	1x per day	Combined with NJ 421 from Amsterdam - Nürnberg. Combined with NJ 491 from Nürnberg - Vienna.
Nightjet	NJ403 (IC 60403)	ÖBB and DB	Amsterdam Centraal - Utrecht Centraal - Arnhem Centraal - Duisburg HBF - Düsseldorf Hbf - Bonn-Beuel - Koblenz HBF - Mainz HBF - Frankfurt Flughafen - Frankfurt HBF - Mannheim HBF - Karlsruhe HBF - Baden-Baden - Offenburg - Freiburg HBF - Basel Bad - Basel - Zürich	1x per day	

Regional cross-border services (from Arnhem, Enschede, Hengelo, Maastricht, Nieuweschans, Venlo, Heerlen and Roosendaal) are not part of NS International, nor was the CityNightLine from Amsterdam to Munich and Zurich.

== Rolling stock ==
Class	Illustration	Type	Top speed		Number	Built	Notes
Class	Illustration	Type	mph	km/h	Number	Built	Notes
Current rolling stock
Siemens Vectron		Locomotive	99	160	18	2019-	Used for the Nightjet Amsterdam - Innsbruck / Vienna, Nightjet Amsterdam - Zürich and for the intercity Amsterdam - Berlin.
ICNG		Electric multiple unit	124	200	20	2019-	Intercity Nieuwe Generatie (New Generation Intercity) A further 79 trainsets have been ordered, by the NS. Those will be used for service within the Netherlands and to Belgium via Antwerp and Brussels.
Former rolling stock
Series 43000		Electric multiple unit	186	300	2	1997	Used for Eurostar service, now fully owned by Eurostar Group
V250		Electric multiple unit	155	250	16 ordered	2008-2010	Trains were to be used for Fyra, but the order was cancelled in 2013 and the whole Fyra project abandoned.
DBAG Class 406		Electric multiple unit	199	320	3	1999	Formerly used for ICE International service. Retired in April 2025.

== See also ==
- Dutch railway services
- Train routes in the Netherlands
