= Meike de Bruijn =

Dutch cyclist

Personal information
- Born: 15 April 1970 (age 56) Amsterdam, Netherlands

Cycling career
- Sport: Cycling
- Discipline: Road cycling

Professional teams
- 1997–1998: Rabobank
- 1999: The Greenery-Hawk-VW
- 2000: Radteam Kupfernagel

Meike de Bruijn (born 15 April 1970 in Amsterdam) is a road cyclist from Netherlands. She represented her nation at the 1995 UCI Road World Championships and 1997 UCI Road World Championships in the women's time trial. In 1995 she won a stage in the French stage race Laines-aux-Bois. In 1996 she won the silver medal at the Dutch National Road Race Championships. In the general classification of the 2000 Gracia–Orlová she finished second.
