= Noorderkempen railway station =

Railway station in Antwerp, Belgium

Noorderkempen
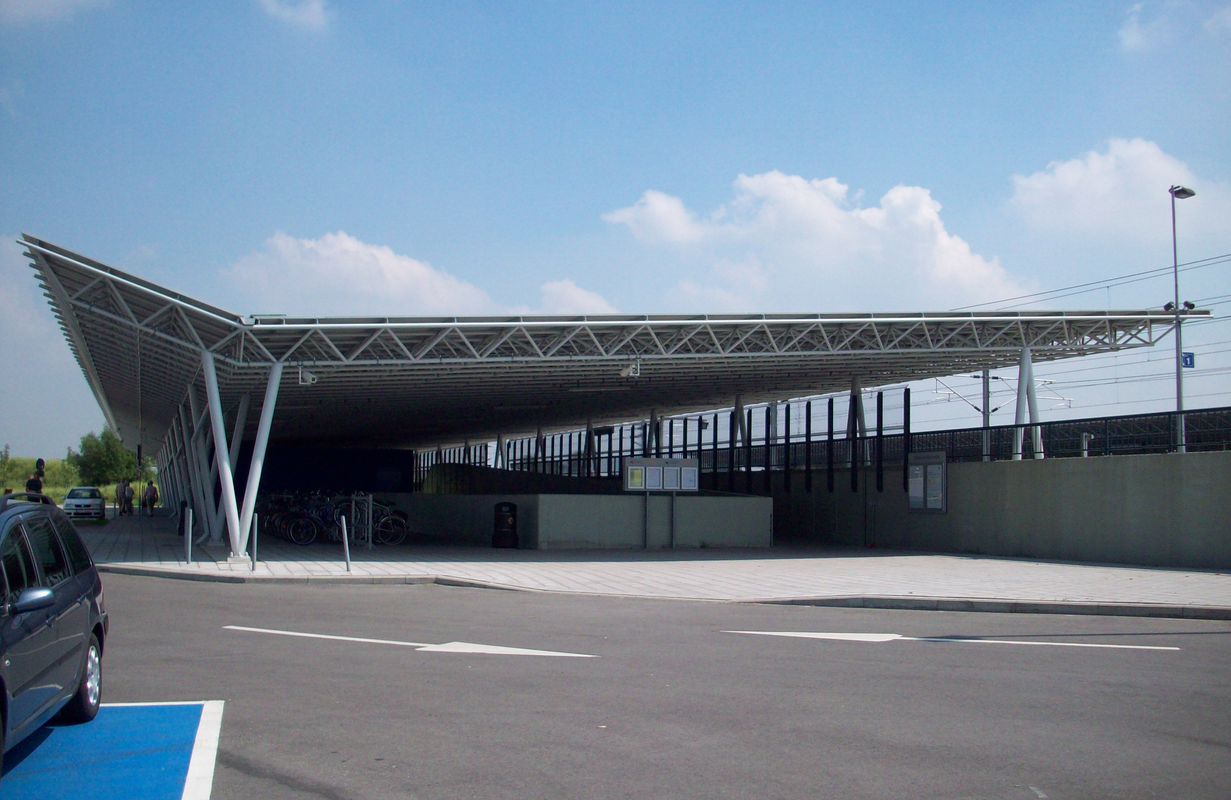

General information
- Location: Brecht, Antwerp, Belgium
- Coordinates: 51°21′25″N 4°37′58″E
- System: Railway Station
- Owner: National Railway Company of Belgium
- Line: HSL 4
- Platforms: 2
- Tracks: 4

History
- Opened: 15 June 2009

Services
Preceding station	NMBS/SNCB	Following station
Terminus	IC 15	Antwerpen-Luchtbal towards Antwerpen-Centraal
Preceding station	NS International	Following station
Antwerpen-Centraal towards Brussels-South	Eurocity 9200	Breda towards Rotterdam Centraal
Location

Noorderkempen is a railway station near the town of Brecht, Antwerp province, Belgium. The train services are operated by National Railway Company of Belgium (NMBS) and Nederlandse Spoorwegen (NS).

The station makes the Northern Kempen region connected to the rail network via the HSL 4 route and is the only true high-speed station in Belgium. However, it is not served by any true high-speed train, functioning rather as a park and ride for Antwerp and to a lesser extent Breda. The Thalys services (300 km/h) skip the station as the IC services (160 km/h - 200 km/h) serve the station.

This station features four tracks: the outside ones, with side platforms, are used by trains stopping there, while the central ones, with no platforms, are used by nonstop high-speed trains.

== Train services ==
The following services currently the serve the station:

- Intercity services (IC-15) Noorderkempen - Antwerp
- Eurocity services Brussel-Zuid - Rotterdam Centraal

== Gallery ==
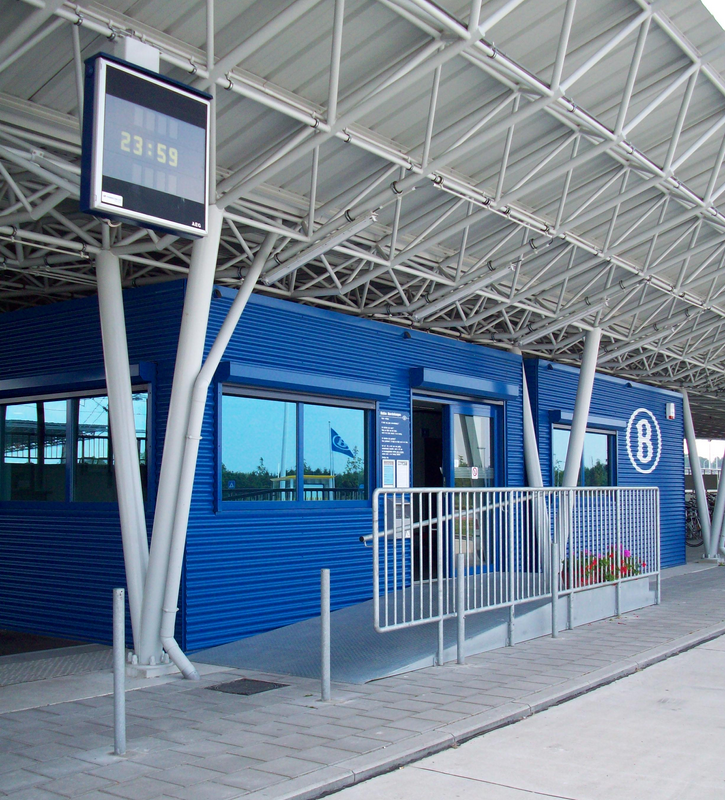
Sales point and information booth.

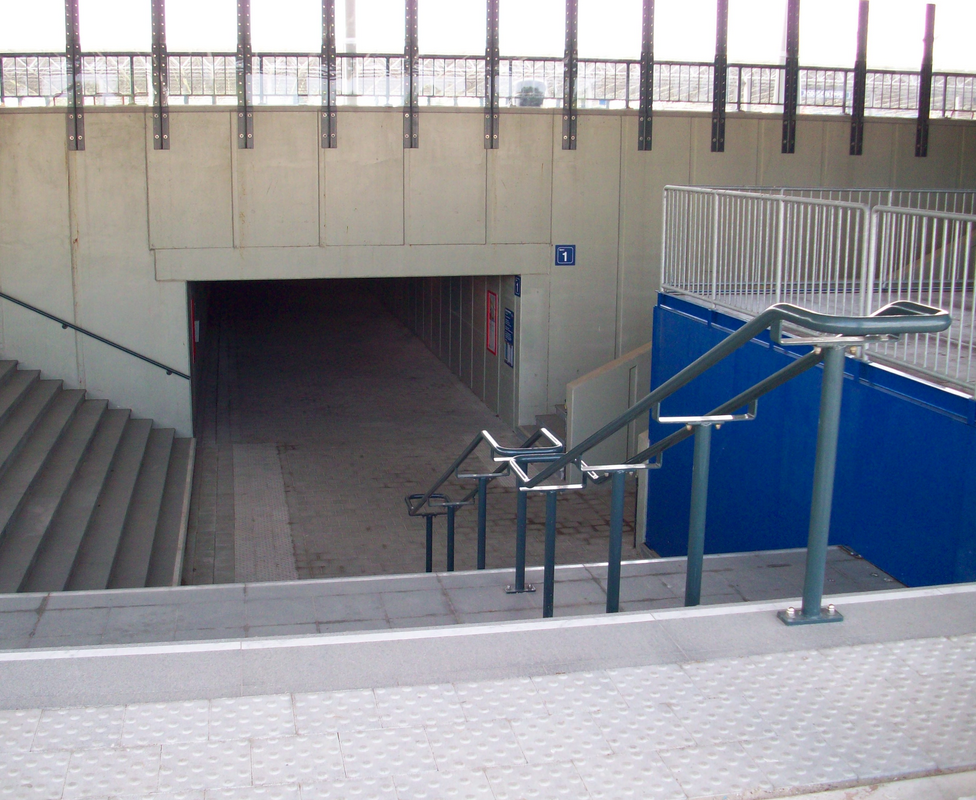
Entrance to the tunnel under the tracks.

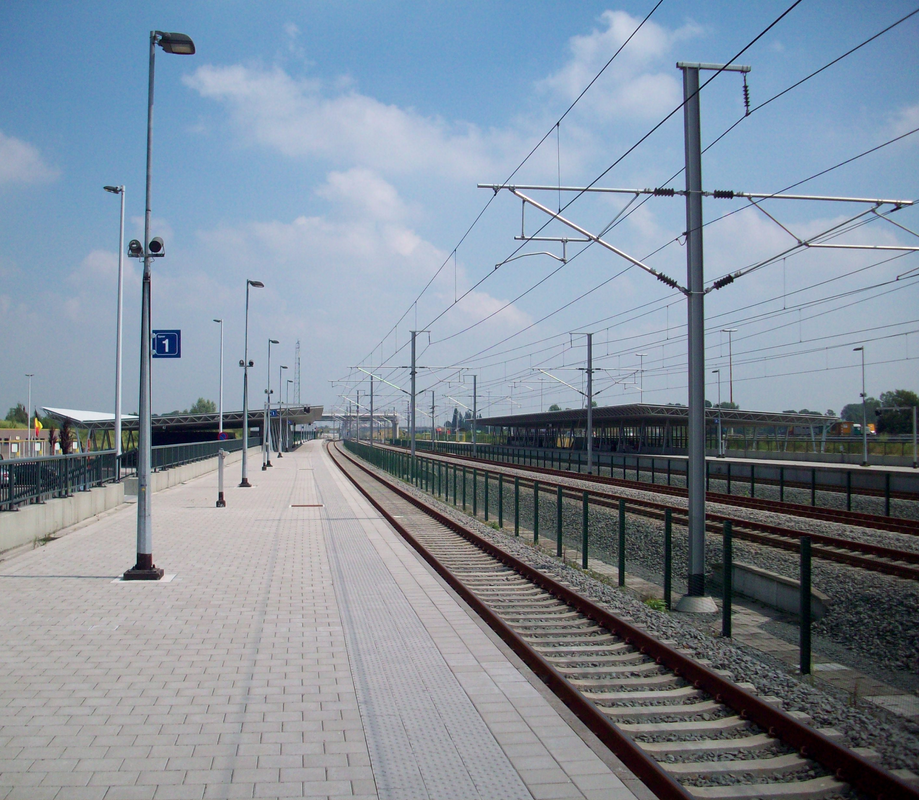
General view of the tracks.

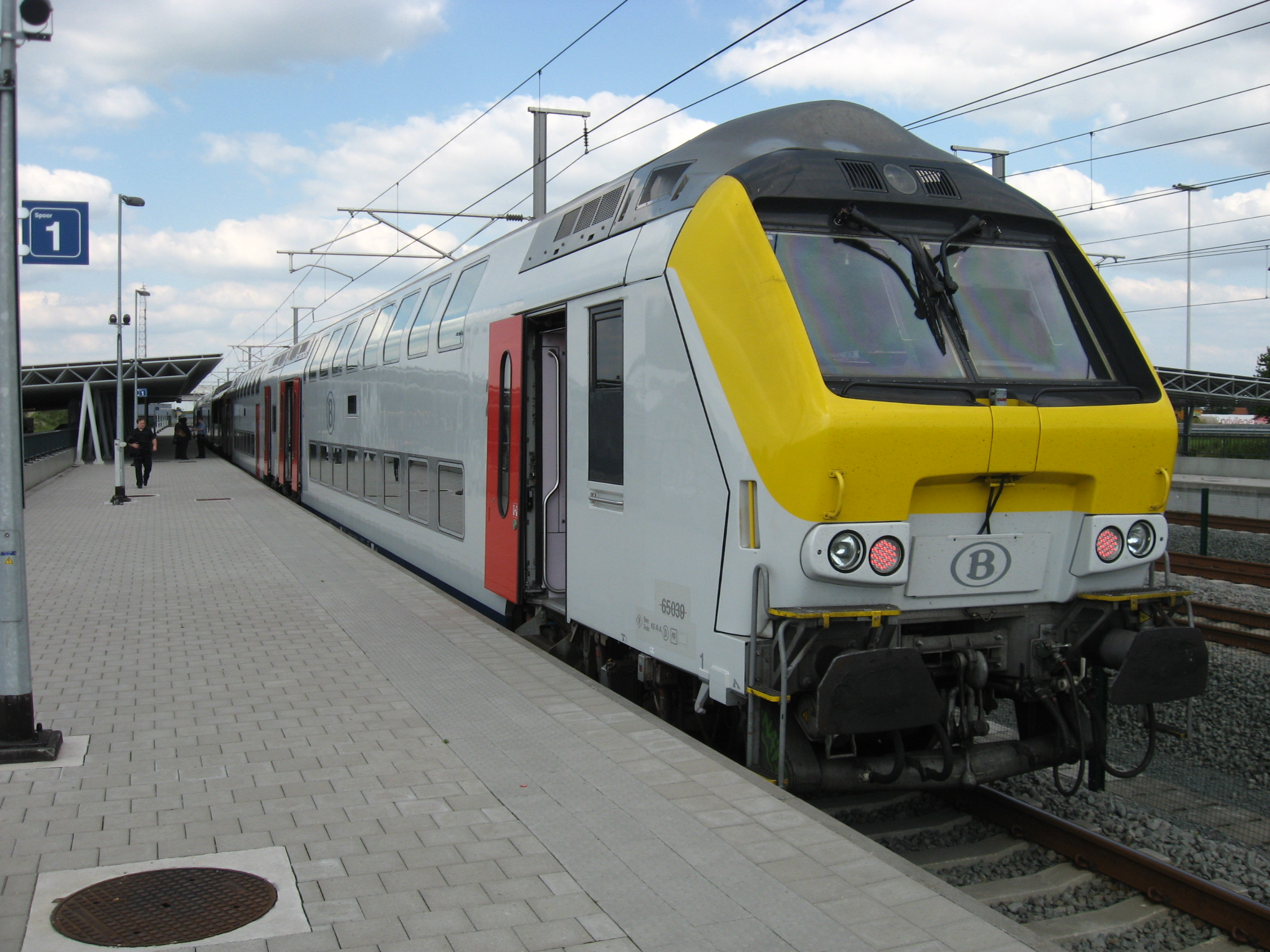
Train departing to Antwerp.
