= Laima Zilporytė =

Soviet cyclist (born 1967)

Personal information
- Born: 5 April 1967 (age 59)
Medal record
Women's road cycling
Representing the Soviet Union
Olympic Games
Bronze medal – third place	1988 Seoul	Individual Road Race
UCI Road World Championships
Gold medal – first place	1989 Chambéry	Team time trial
Silver medal – second place	1988 Renaix	Team time trial

Laima Zilporytė (born 5 April 1967 in Mediniai) is a retired female cyclist, who trained at Dynamo sports society in Panevėžys and represented the USSR at the 1988 Summer Olympics in Seoul, South Korea. There she won the bronze medal in the women's individual road race, after being defeated in the sprint by the Netherlands' Monique Knol and West Germany's Jutta Niehaus.
