= Cycling at the 1988 Summer Olympics – Women's individual road race =

Women's individual road race at the Games of the XXIV Olympiad
- Dates: 26 September
- Competitors: 53 from 23 nations
- Winning time: 2:00.52

Medalists
1st place, gold medalist(s)		Monique Knol; Netherlands
2nd place, silver medalist(s)		Jutta Niehaus; West Germany
3rd place, bronze medalist(s)		Laima Zilporytė; Soviet Union

These are the official results of the Women's Individual Road Race at the 1988 Summer Olympics in Seoul, South Korea, held on 26 September 1988.

== Final classification ==
Rank	Cyclist	Time
	Monique Knol (NED)	2:00:52
	Jutta Niehaus (FRG)	–
	Laima Zilporytė (URS)	–
4	Geneviève Robic-Brunet (CAN)	–
5	Valentina Yevpak (URS)	–
6	Maria Blower (GBR)	–
7	Marie Höljer (SWE)	–
8	Inga Thompson (USA)	–
9	Sally Hodge (GBR)	–
10	Catherine Marsal (FRA)	–
11	Lisa Brambani (GBR)	–
12	Ines Varenkamp (FRG)	–
13	Viola Paulitz (FRG)	–
14	Bunki Bankaitis-Davis (USA)	–
15	Imelda Chiappa (ITA)	–
16	Sally Zack (USA)	–
17	Yvonne Elkuch (LIE)	–
18	Edith Schönenberger (SUI)	–
19	Heleen Hage (NED)	–
20	Unni Larsen (NOR)	–
21	Jeannie Longo (FRA)	–
22	Elizabeth Hepple (AUS)	–
23	Kristel Werckx (BEL)	–
24	Lu Suyan (CHN)	–
25	Angela Ranft (GDR)	–
26	Paula Westher (SWE)	–
27	Donna Gould (AUS)	–
28	Cécile Odin (FRA)	–
29	Kathleen Shannon (AUS)	–
30	Terumi Ogura (JPN)	–
31	Kim Gyeong-suk (KOR)	–
32	Maria Canins (ITA)	–
33	Yan Yinhua (CHN)	–
34	Alla Jakovleva (URS)	–
35	Astrid Danielsen (NOR)	–
36	Agnes Dusart (BEL)	–
37	No Yeom-ju (KOR)	–
38	Kelly-Ann Way (CAN)	–
39	Sara Neil (CAN)	–
40	Barbara Ganz (SUI)	–
41	Brigitte Gyr-Gschwend (SUI)	–
42	Karina Skibby (DEN)	–
43	Tea Vikstedt-Nyman (FIN)	–
44	Marianne Berglund (SWE)	–
45	Roberta Bonanomi (ITA)	–
46	Cora Westland (NED)	2:01:50
47	Chen Weixiu (CHN)	–
48	Stephanie McKnight (ISV)	–
49	Hong Yeong-mi (KOR)	2:03:24
50	Natsue Seki (JPN)	2:14:32
–	Petra Rossner (GDR)	DNF
–	Madonna Harris (NZL)	DNF
–	Yang Hsiu-chen (TPE)	DNF

== See also ==
- Men's Individual Road Race
