= Sue Ehlers =

American cyclist

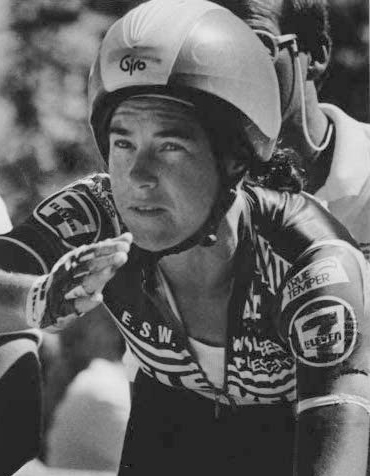
- Ehlers in 1988

Cycling career
- Sport: Cycling

Professional team
- 7 Eleven
Medal record
Representing United States
UCI Road World Championships
Silver medal – second place	1987 Villach	Team time trial

Susan Ehlers-Sutton is a retired American cyclist who won a silver medal in the team time trial at the 1987 UCI Road World Championships. Individually she won a bronze medal in the road race at the 1983 national championships.
