= Alla Jakovleva =

Soviet cyclist

Personal information
- Born: 12 July 1963 (age 63) Porkhov, Pskov Oblast, Russian SFSR, Soviet Union
- Height: 163 cm (5 ft 4 in)
- Weight: 60 kg (132 lb)
Medal record
Representing Soviet Union
Women's road cycling
World Championships
| Gold medal – first place | 1987 Villach | Team time trial |
| Silver medal – second place | 1988 Ronse | Team time trial |
| Bronze medal – third place | 1986 Colorado Springs | Road race |

Alla Aleksandrovna Jakovleva (Алла Александровна Яковлева, also written as Alla Jakowlewa and Alla Yakovleva; born 12 July 1963) in Porkhov, Pskov Oblast, Soviet Union, is a retired Soviet Union female road cyclist. After finishing third in the women's road race at the 1986 UCI Road World Championships she became world champion in the women's team time trial in 1987 and finished second in the women's team time trial in 1988. Jakovleva competed at the 1988 Summer Olympics in the women's road race and finished 34th.
