= Lyubov Pugovichnikova =

Medal record
Representing Soviet Union
Women's road cycling
World Championships
Gold medal – first place	1987 Villach	Team time trial

Lyubov Mikhailovna Pugovichnikova (Russian: Любовь Михайловна Пуговичникова) is a Soviet Union female road cyclist. She became World Champion in the women's team time trial at the UCI Road World Championships in 1987.
