= Karin Schuitema =

Dutch cyclist

Personal information
- Born: the Netherlands

Cycling career
- Sport: Cycling
- Discipline: Road cycling

Karin Schuitema (born 1969) is a road cyclist from the Netherlands. In 1987 she won bronze at the Dutch National Road Race Championships. She participated at the 1988 UCI Road World Championships in the Women's team time trial.
