= Yan Yinhua =

Chinese cyclist

Personal information
- Born: 12 August 1968 (age 58)

Cycling career
- Sport: Cycling

Yan Yinhua (born 12 August 1968) is a Chinese former cyclist. She competed in the women's individual road race at the 1988 Summer Olympics.
