= Antwerpen-Centraal railway station =

Railway station in Antwerp, Belgium

Antwerpen-Centraal
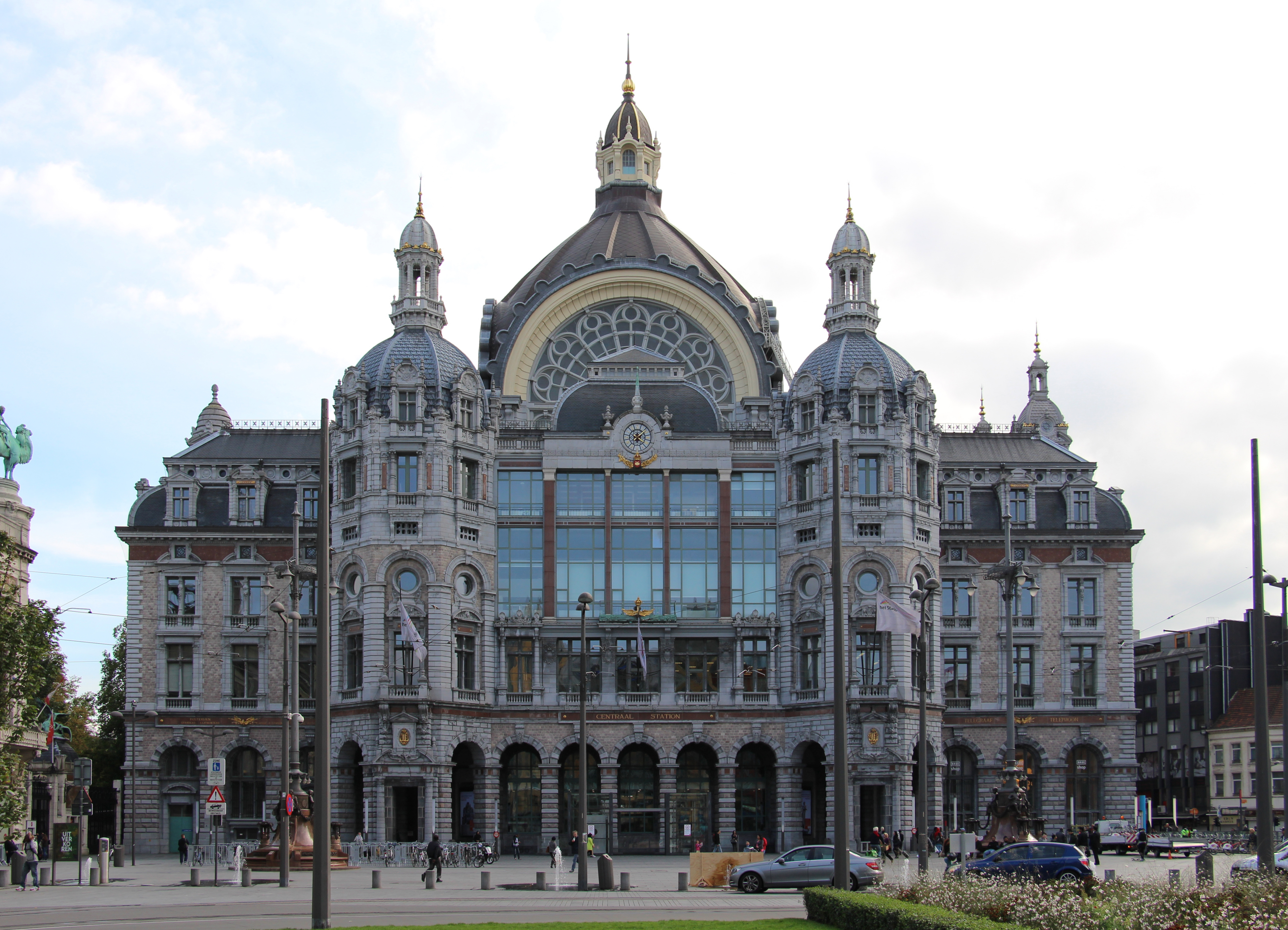
- View of the station from the Koningin Astridplein

General information
- Location: Koningin Astridplein, 2018 Antwerp; Belgium
- Coordinates: 51°13′02″N 4°25′16″E
- System: Railway Station
- Owner: NMBS/SNCB
- Operator: NMBS/SNCB
- Lines: 12, 25, 27, 59
- Platforms: 8 (24)
- Tracks: 14

Construction
- Platform levels: 4

Other information
- Station code: ANTC
- IATA code: ZWE

History
- Opened: 11 August 1905; 121 years ago
Location
- Location within Belgium Location within Europe

Antwerpen-Centraal railway station (Dutch: Station Antwerpen-Centraal; French: Gare d'Anvers-Central) (Note: Officially Antwerpen-Centraal (Dutch: Antwerpen-Centraal; French: Anvers-Central)) is the main railway station in Antwerp, Belgium. It is one of the most important hubs in the country and is one of the four Belgian stations on the high-speed rail network. From 1873 to early 2007, it was a terminal station. The current building, designed by the architect Louis Delacenserie, was constructed between 1895 and 1905. On 23 March 2007, a tunnel with two continuous tracks was opened under part of the city and under the station. The train services are operated by the National Railway Company of Belgium (NMBS/SNCB).

== History ==
=== Early history ===
Antwerp's first station was the terminus of the Brussels–Mechelen–Antwerp railway line, which opened on 3 June 1836. The original station building was made of wood and was replaced by a new and larger building on the occasion of the opening of the new international connection to the Netherlands in 1854–55.

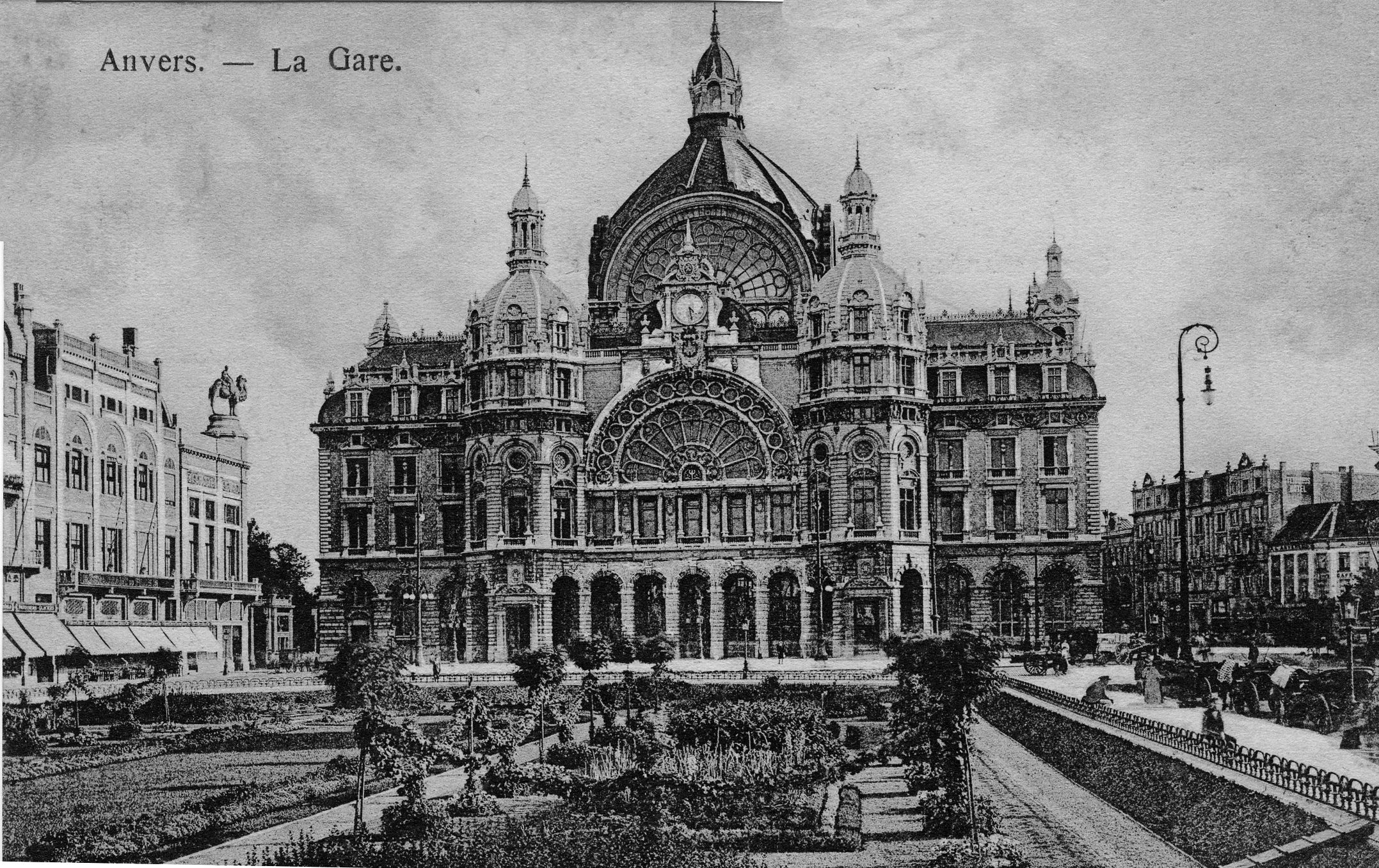
Antwerpen-Centraal railway station, c. 1910. Note the elaborate garden on the Koningin Astridplein.

The current terminal station building was constructed between 1895 and 1905 as a replacement for the first station. The stone-clad building was designed by the architect Louis Delacenserie. The viaduct into the station is also a notable structure designed by local architect Jan Van Asperen. A plaque on the north wall bears the name Middenstatie ("Middle Station"), an expression now antiquated in Dutch. To the north of the station a large public square, known as the Statieplein ("Station Square"), was created, acting as an entry to the city for its many commuters. In 1935, the square's name was changed to the Koningin Astridplein, in honour of the recently deceased Queen Astrid.

=== World War II damage and restoration ===
During World War II, severe damage was inflicted to the train hall by the impact of V-2 rockets, though the structural stability of the building remained intact, according to the National Railway Company of Belgium. Nevertheless, it has been claimed that the warping of the substructure due to a V-2 impact had caused constructional stresses. The impact remains visible due to a lasting wave-distortion in the roofing of the hall.

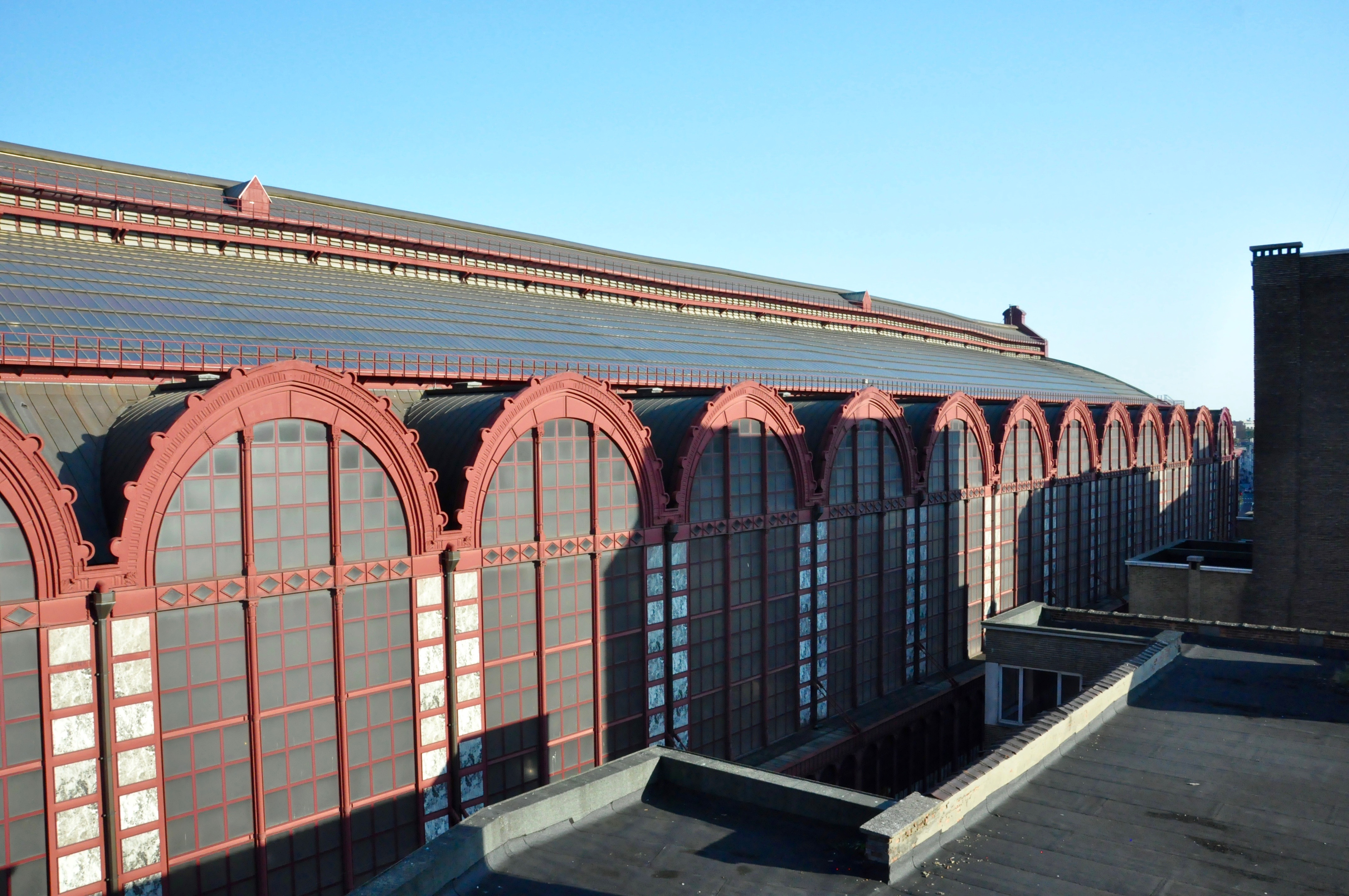
Visible wave-distortion in the roof of the train hall. The warping of the structure can be seen at the far top-right end of the roof.

In the mid-20th century, the building's condition had deteriorated to the point that its demolition was being considered. The station was closed on 31 January 1986 for safety reasons, after which restoration work to the roof (starting at the end of March 1986 and finishing in September 1986) and façades was performed. The stress problems due to the impact of bombs during the war were reportedly solved by the use of polycarbonate sheets instead of glass, due to its elasticity and its relatively low weight (40% less than glass), which avoided the need for extra supporting pillars. After replacing or repairing steel elements, they were painted burgundy. Copper was also used in the renovation process of the roof.

=== Expansion for high-speed trains ===
In 1998, large-scale reconstruction work began to convert the station from a terminus to a through station. A tunnel was excavated between Antwerpen-Berchem railway station in the south of the city and Antwerpen-Dam railway station in the north, passing under the Central Station, with platforms on two underground levels. This allows Thalys, HSL 4 and HSL-Zuid high-speed trains to travel through Antwerpen-Centraal without the need to turn around (the previous layout obliged Amsterdam–Brussels trains to call only at Antwerpen-Berchem or reverse at Central).

The major elements of the construction project were completed in 2007, and the first through trains ran on 25 March 2007. The station was awarded a Grand Prix at the European Union Prize for Cultural Heritage / Europa Nostra Awards in 2011. These works, including the connecting tunnels, cost €765 million.

== Architecture ==
The station is widely regarded as the finest example of railway architecture in Belgium, although the extraordinary eclecticism of the influences on Delacenserie's design had led to a difficulty in assigning it to a particular architectural style. In W. G. Sebald's novel Austerlitz an ability to appreciate the full range of the styles that might have influenced Delacenserie is used to illustrate the brilliance of the fictional architectural historian who is the novel's protagonist. Owing to the vast dome above the waiting room hall, the building became colloquially known as the spoorwegkathedraal ("railroad cathedral").

The originally iron and glass train hall (185 metres long and 44 metres or 43 metres high) was designed by Clément Van Bogaert, an engineer, and covers an area of 12,000 square metres. The height of the station was necessary for dissipating the smoke of steam locomotives. The roof of the train hall was originally made of steel.

In 2009, the American magazine Newsweek judged Antwerpen-Centraal the world's fourth greatest train station. In 2014, the British-American magazine Mashable awarded Antwerpen-Centraal the first place for the most beautiful railway station in the world.

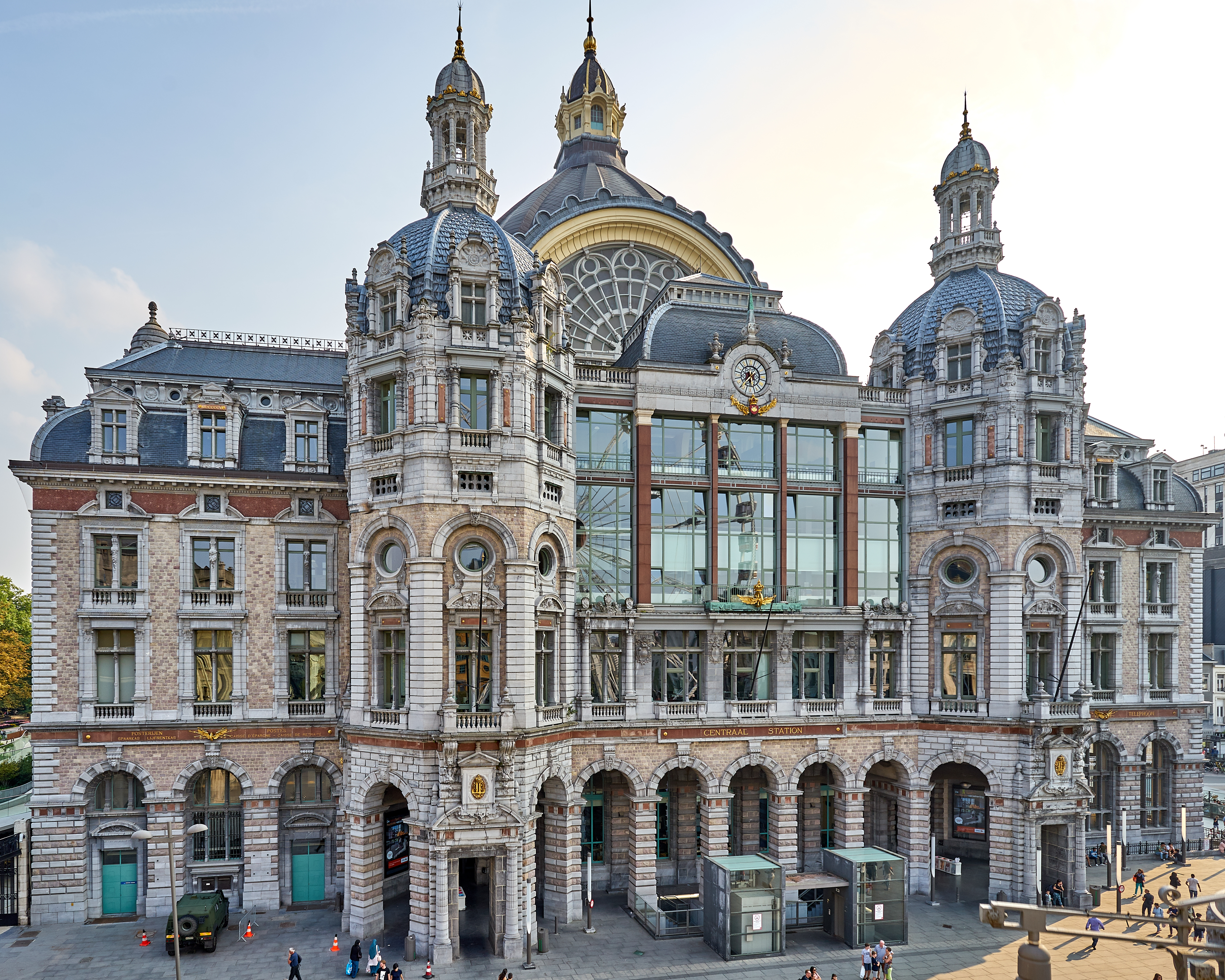
Frontal view

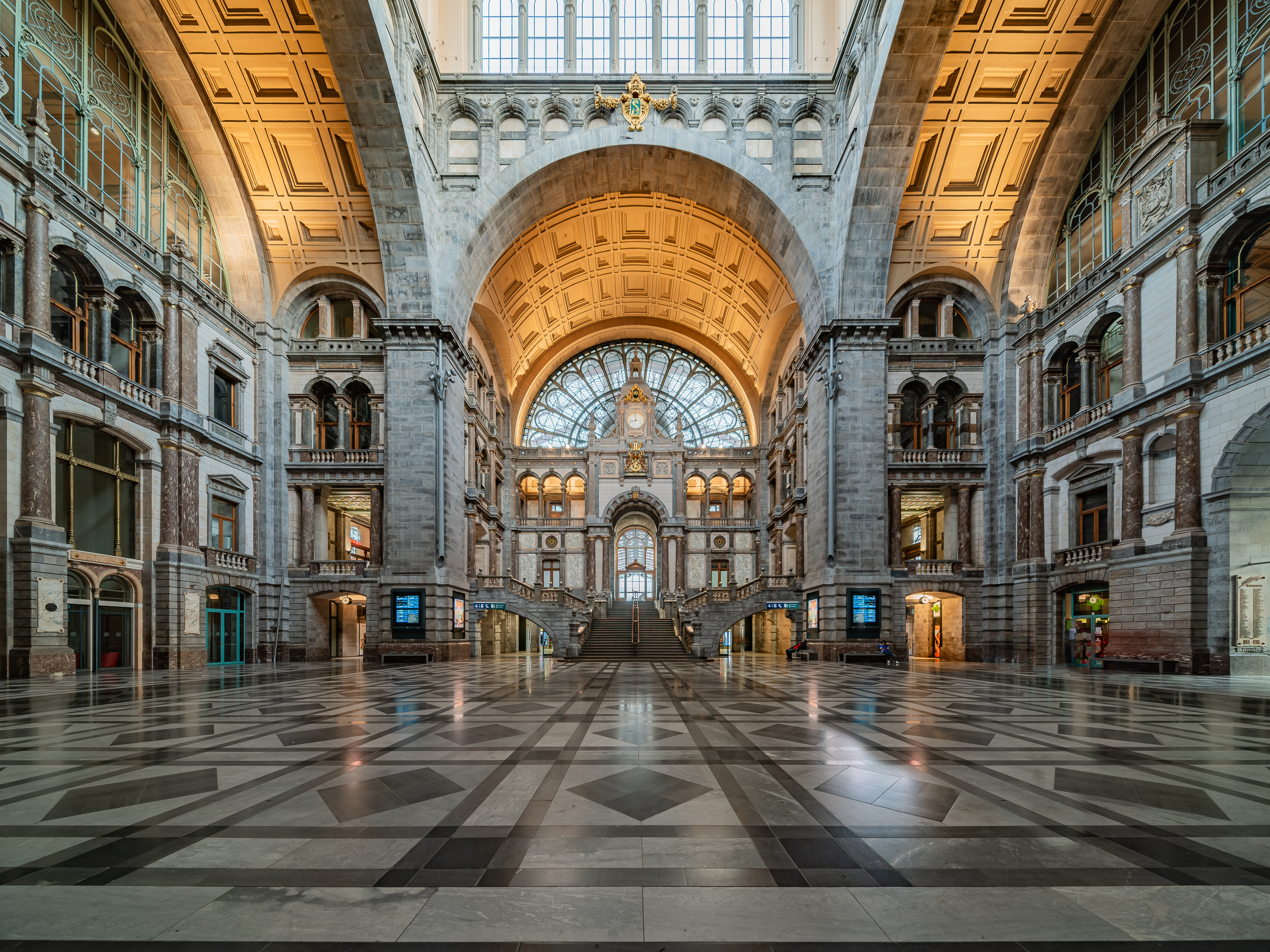
Entrance hall

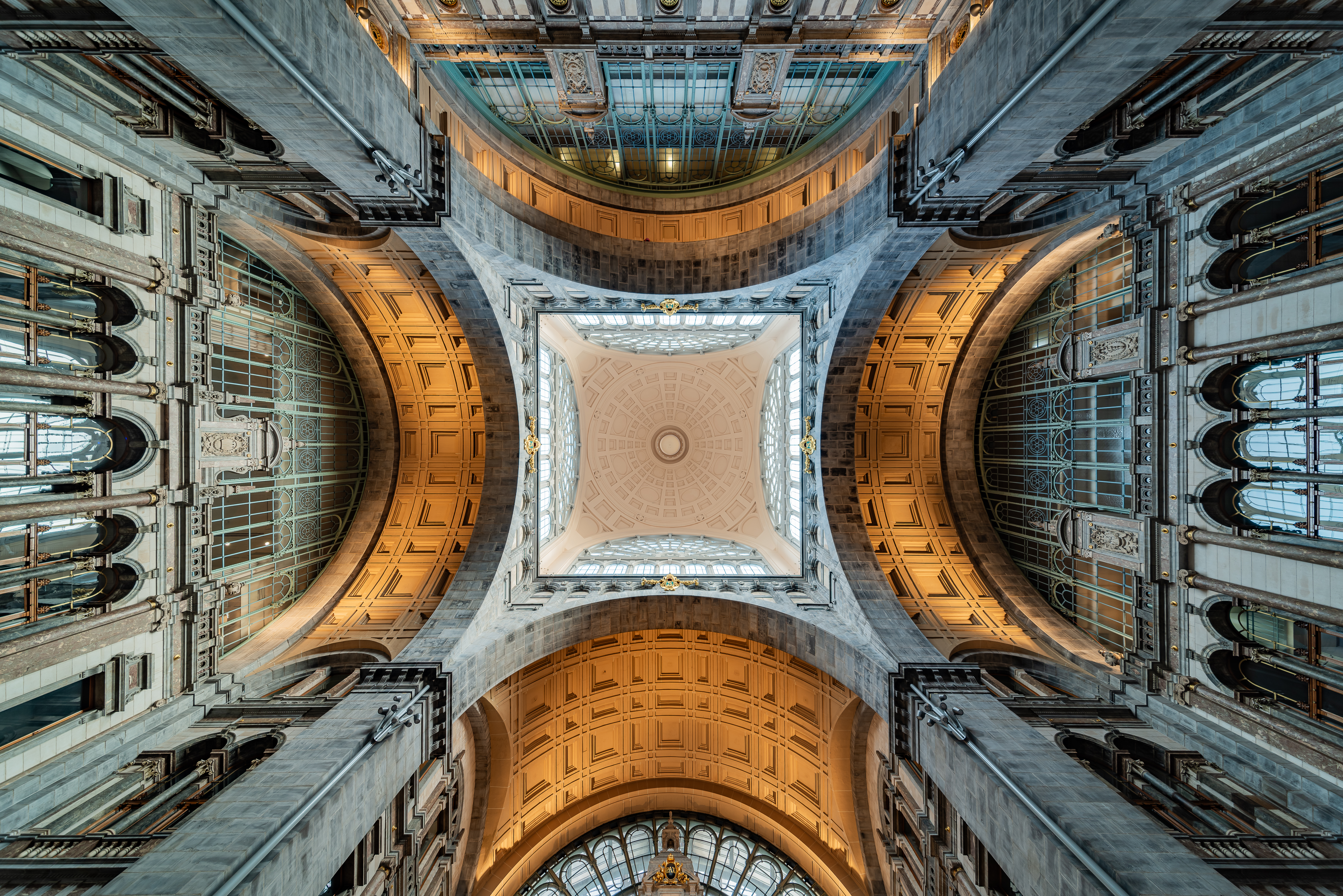
Ceiling

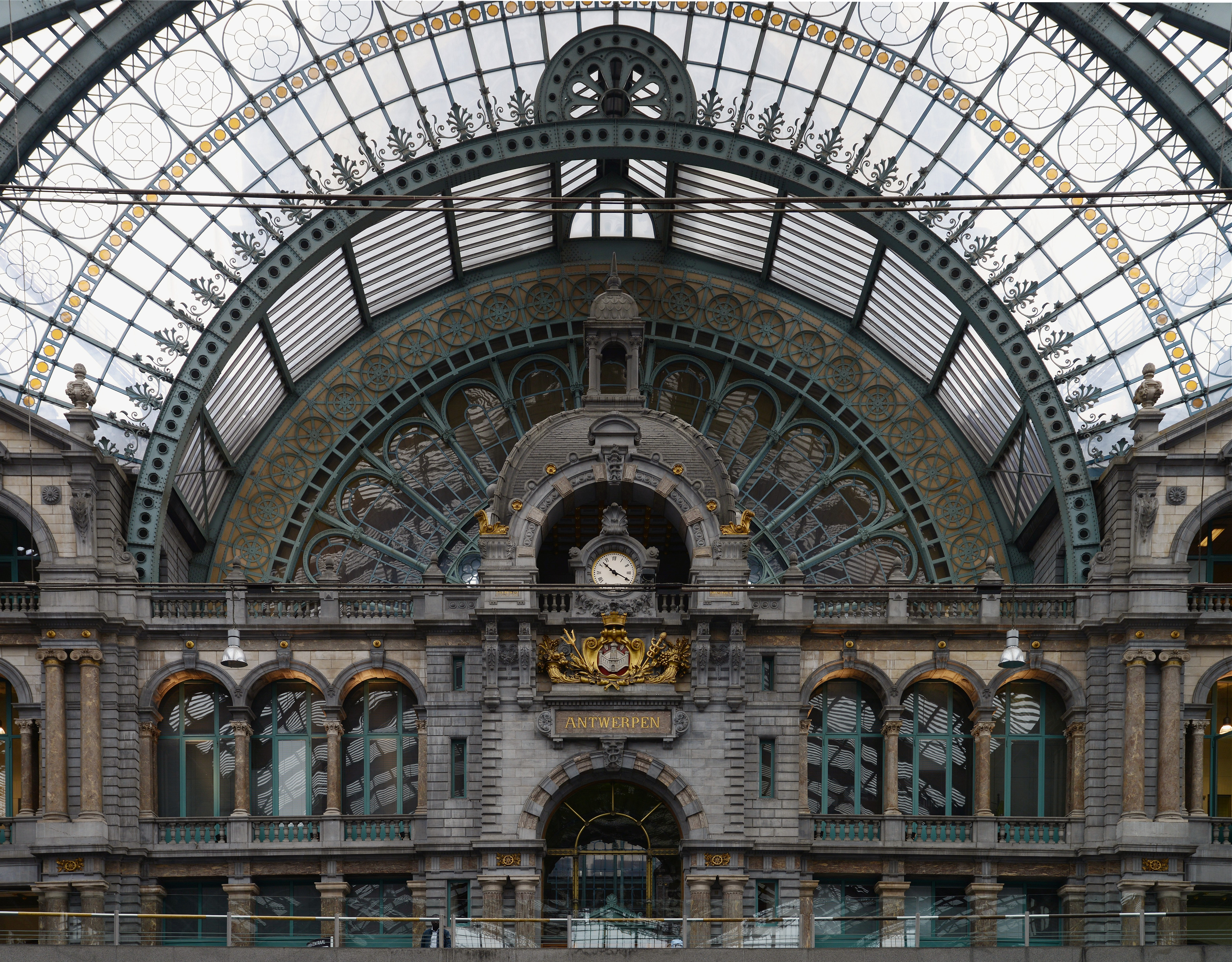
The clock at the upper level

== Station layout ==
The station has four levels and 14 tracks arranged as follows:

- Level +1: The original station, six terminating tracks, arranged as two groups of three and separated by a central opening allowing views of the lower levels
- Level 0: Houses ticketing facilities and commercial space
- Level −1: 7 m below street level, four terminating tracks, arranged in two pairs separated by the central opening.
- Level −2: 18 m below street level, four through tracks, leading to the two tracks of the tunnel under the city (used by high-speed trains and domestic services towards the north).
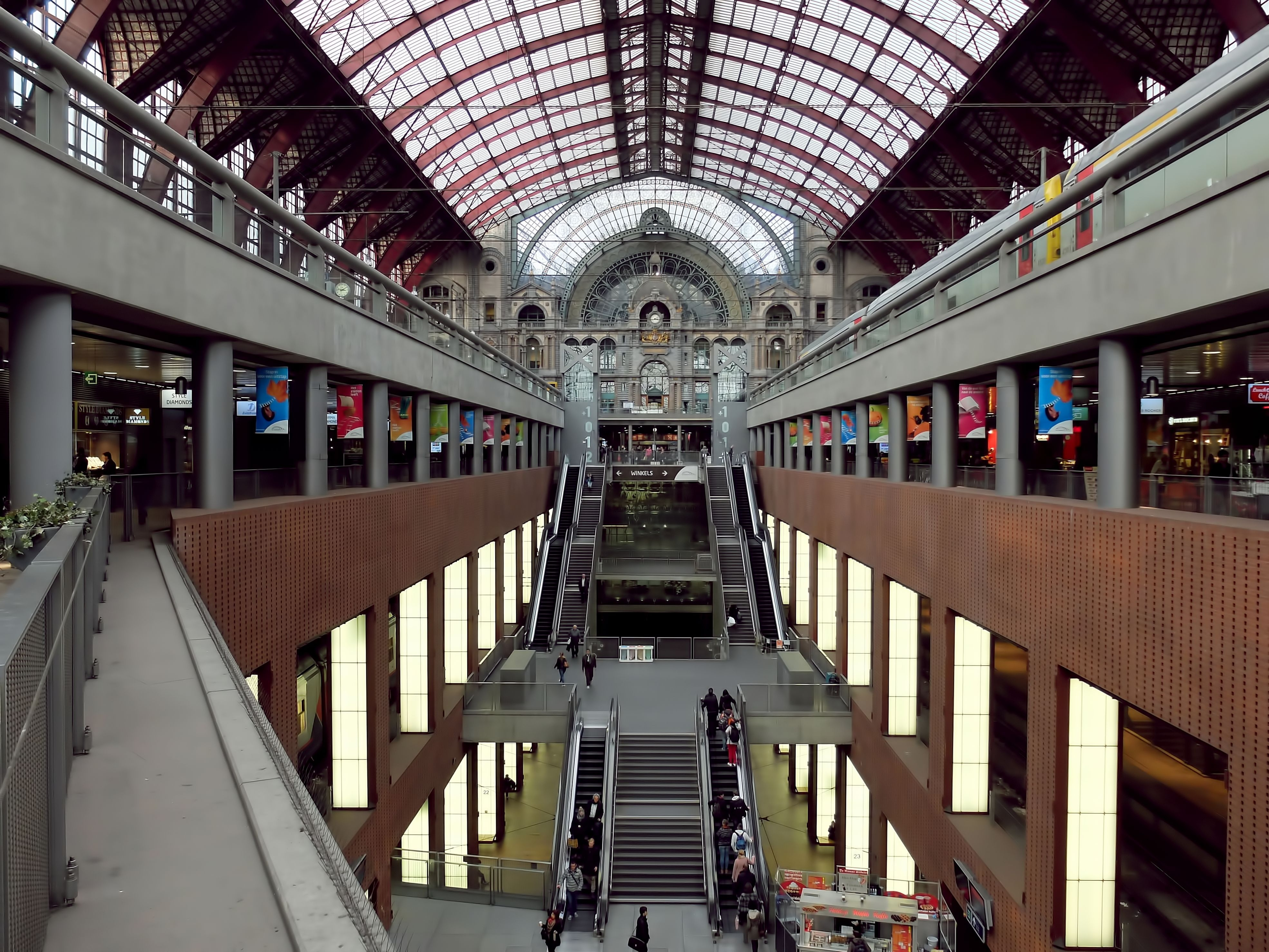
The different levels

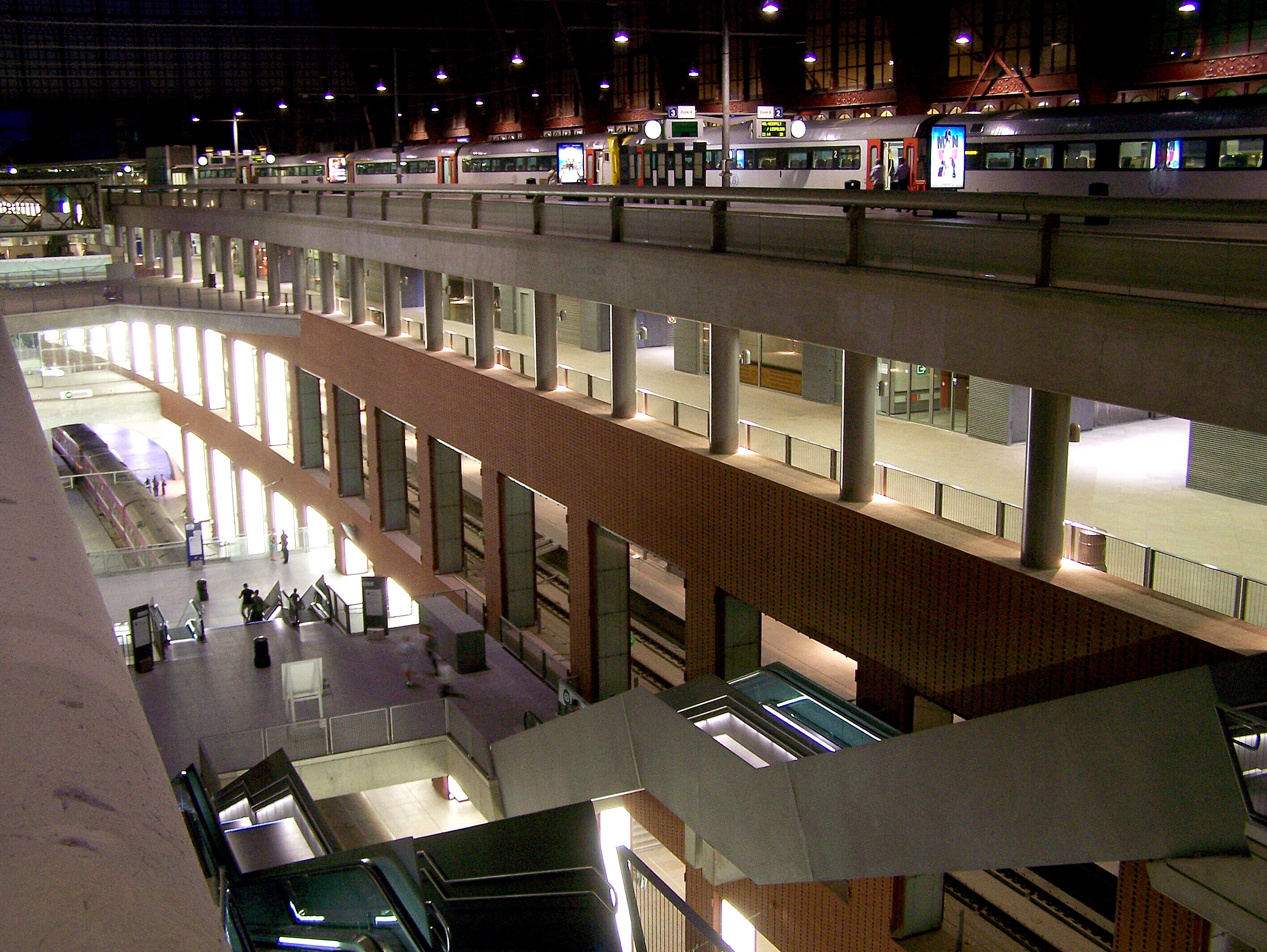
Station atrium showing the four levels

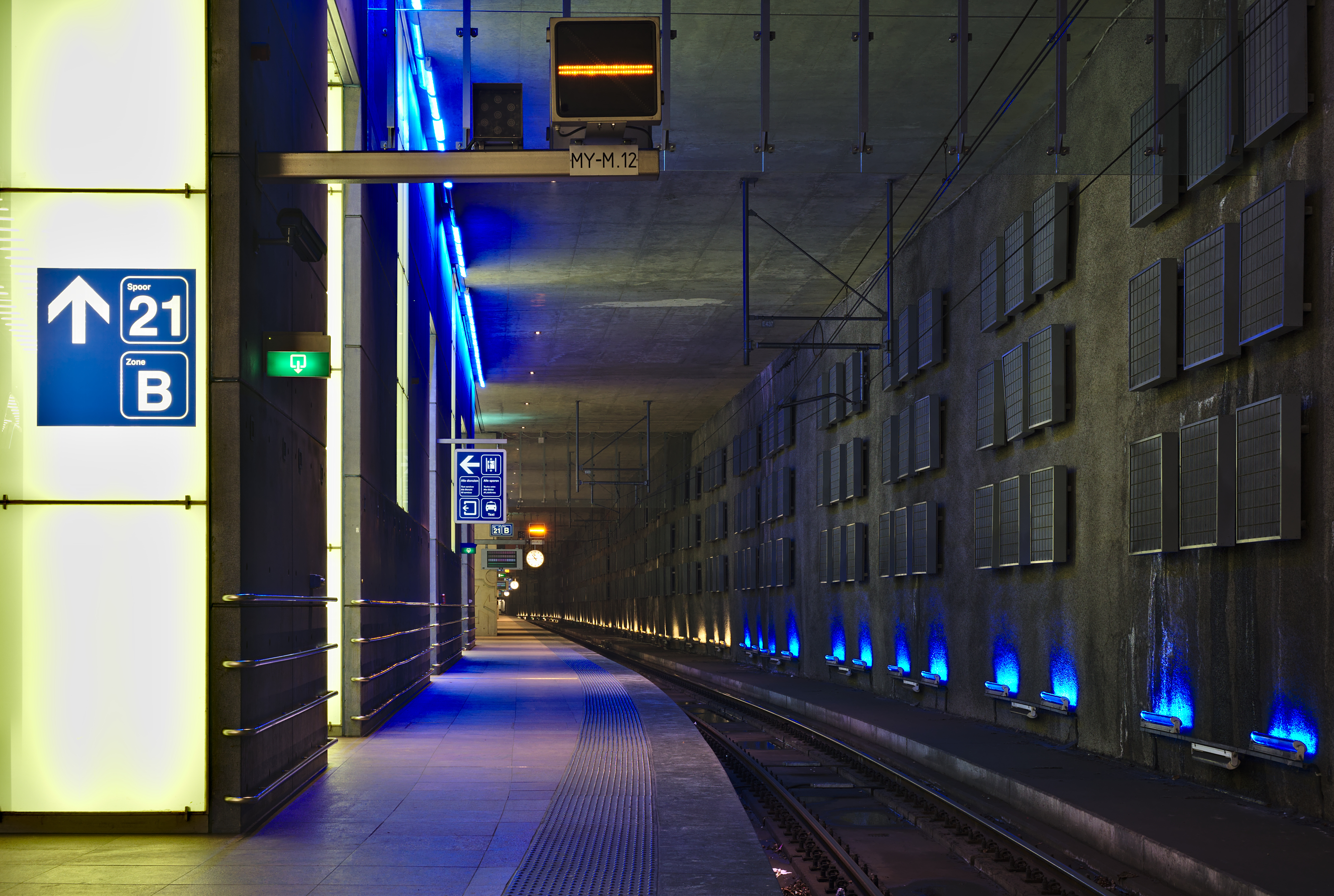
Platform 21 on level -2

== Services ==
The station is served by the following services:

- High speed services (Eurostar) Amsterdam – Rotterdam – Antwerp – Brussels – Paris
- High speed services (Eurostar) Amsterdam – Rotterdam – Antwerp – Brussels – Lille
- High speed services (Eurostar) Amsterdam – Rotterdam – Antwerp – Brussels – Chambéry – Bourg-Saint-Maurice (in winter)
- High speed services (Eurostar) Amsterdam – Rotterdam – Antwerp – Brussels – Avignon – Marseille (in summer)
- International Intercity services Amsterdam (12x a day) or The Hague HS (4x a day) – Rotterdam – Breda – Noorderkempen – Antwerp – Brussels Airport – Brussels
- International European Sleeper service Brussels – Amsterdam – Berlin – Prague
- Intercity services (IC-02) Antwerp – Sint-Niklaas – Gent – Bruges – Ostend
- Intercity services (IC-04) Antwerp – Sint-Niklaas – Gent – Kortrijk – Poperinge/Lille
- Intercity services (IC-05) Antwerp – Mechelen – Brussels – Nivelles – Charleroi (weekdays)
- Intercity services (IC-08) Antwerp – Mechelen – Brussels Airport – Leuven – Hasselt
- Intercity services (IC-09) Antwerp – Lier – Aarschot – Leuven (weekdays)
- Intercity services (IC-09) Antwerp – Lier – Aarschot – Hasselt – Liège (weekends)
- Intercity services (IC-10) Antwerp – Mol – Hamont/Hasselt
- Intercity services (IC-15) Noorderkempen – Antwerp
- Intercity services (IC-22) Essen – Antwerp – Mechelen – Brussels (weekdays)
- Intercity services (IC-22) Antwerp – Mechelen – Brussels – Halle – Braine-le-Comte – Binche (weekends)
- Intercity services (IC-28) Antwerp – Sint-Niklaas – Gent (weekdays)
- Intercity services (IC-30) Antwerp – Herentals – Turnhout
- Intercity services (IC-31) Antwerp – Mechelen – Brussels – Nivelles – Charleroi (weekends)
- Local services (L-22) Roosendaal – Essen – Antwerp – Puurs (weekdays)
- Local services (L-22) Roosendaal – Essen – Antwerp (weekends)
- Local services (L-23) Antwerp – Aarschot – Leuven
- Local services (L-24) Antwerp – Herentals – Mol (weekdays)
- Local services (L-30) Antwerp – Sint-Niklaas – Lokeren
- Brussels RER services (S1) Antwerp – Mechelen – Brussels – Waterloo – Nivelles (weekdays)
- Brussels RER services (S1) Antwerp – Mechelen – Brussels (weekends)

Preceding station	Eurostar	Following station
Brussels-South towards Paris-Nord	Eurostar	Rotterdam Centraal towards Amsterdam Centraal
Brussels-South towards Marne-la-Vallée–Chessy	Eurostar	Rotterdam Centraal towards Amsterdam Centraal
Brussels-South towards Bourg-Saint-Maurice	Eurostar (winter)	Rotterdam Centraal towards Amsterdam Centraal
Brussels-South towards Marseille-Saint-Charles	Eurostar (summer)	Rotterdam Centraal towards Amsterdam Centraal
Preceding station	NS International	Following station
Noorderkempen towards Rotterdam Centraal	Eurocity 9200	Antwerpen-Berchem towards Brussels-South
Rotterdam Centraal towards Lelystad Centrum	Eurocity Direct 9500	Brussels South towards Brussels-South
Preceding station	NMBS/SNCB	Following station
Terminus	IC 02	Antwerpen-Berchem towards Oostende
Terminus	IC 04	Antwerpen-Berchem towards Lille-Flandres or Poperinge
Terminus	IC 05	Antwerpen-Berchem towards Charleroi-Sud
Terminus	IC 08	Antwerpen-Berchem towards Hasselt
Terminus	IC 09 weekdays, except holidays	Antwerpen-Berchem towards Leuven
Terminus	IC 09 weekends	Antwerpen-Berchem towards Liège-Guillemins
Terminus	IC 10	Antwerpen-Berchem towards Hamont or Hasselt
Antwerpen-Luchtbal towards Noorderkempen	IC 15	Terminus
Ekeren towards Essen	IC 22 weekdays, except holidays	Antwerpen-Berchem towards Bruxelles-Midi / Brussel-Zuid
Terminus	IC 22 weekends	Antwerpen-Berchem towards Binche
Terminus	IC 28 weekends	Antwerpen-Berchem towards Gent-Sint-Pieters
Terminus	IC 30	Antwerpen-Berchem towards Turnhout
Terminus	IC 31 weekdays	Antwerpen-Berchem towards Bruxelles-Midi / Brussel-Zuid
Terminus	IC 31 weekends	Antwerpen-Berchem towards Charleroi-Sud
Antwerpen-Luchtbal towards Roosendaal	L 22	Antwerpen-Berchem towards Puurs
Terminus	L 23	Antwerpen-Berchem towards Leuven
Terminus	L 24 weekdays	Antwerpen-Berchem towards Mol
Terminus	L 30	Antwerpen-Berchem towards Lokeren
Terminus	S 1 weekdays	Antwerpen-Berchem towards Nivelles
Terminus	S 1 weekends	Antwerpen-Berchem towards Bruxelles-Midi / Brussel-Zuid
Preceding station	European Sleeper	Following station
Brussels-South Terminus	Brussels–Prague	Roosendaal towards Prague

== See also ==
- List of railway stations in Belgium
- Rail transport in Belgium
