= No Yeom-ju =

South Korean cyclist

Personal information
- Born: 15 June 1968 (age 58)

Cycling career
- Sport: Cycling

- No Yeom-ju
- Hangul: 노염주
- Hanja: 魯念珠
- RR: No Yeomju
- MR: No Yŏmju

No Yeom-ju (born 15 June 1968) is a South Korean former cyclist. She attended Uijeongbu Girls' High School, and represented her school at the 67th Korean National Sports Festival in 1986. She went on to study at Kyonggi University. She competed in the women's individual road race at the 1988 Summer Olympics.
