= Clément Van Bogaert =

ir. Clément van Bogaert
- Born: 4 April 1865; Bazel
- Died: 5 May 1937 (aged 72); Brussels
- Citizenship: Belgian
- Education: Completed his studies at the "Ecole du Génie Civil" in Ghent in 1878.
- Engineering career
- Employers: The Kingdom of Belgium, The Belgian railways.
- Projects: Antwerpen-Centraal railway station (platform roof, elevation works and viaducts, railway nodes, main works); Special works of the Beijing-Hankou Railway line (amongst which the long bridge across the Huanghe); Railway electrification system of the Belgian railways (1916 and onwards)

Clément Van Bogaert (4 April 1865, in Bazel – 5 May 1937, in Brussels) was a (state-)engineer and constructor, best known for the steel platform roof of the Antwerpen-Centraal railway station (sometimes also called "Central Station", and formerly named "Middenstatie"), built during the Belle Époque. Ultimately in 1896, Van Bogaert was crowned as a knight of the Order of Leopold. In 1897, or earlier, he was promoted to chief engineer of the Belgian State-railways (Dutch: Belgische Staatsspoorwegen).

== Projects ==
=== Railways ===
==== Early career (1878–1882) ====
After he graduated in 1878 at the "Ecole du Génie Civil" in Ghent, he started to work at the Belgian railways where his organisational skills were quickly noticed. In 1882 he was a "fully fledged" (Dutch: volwaardige) railway engineer and head of a department of Antwerp.

==== Antwerpen-Centraal railway station (1886–1899) ====
In 1886, he was assigned the task to occupy himself exclusively with the planning of the Antwerpen-Centraal railway station, including the study and execution of the main works, als in regards to the railway lines which gathered there. Along with his assistant Edouard de Rudder, they completed the design of the railway hall already in May 1889. It has been claimed that Edouard de Rudder was not the only assistant in regards to the realisation of the platform roof.
