= Hong Yeong-mi =

South Korean cyclist (born 1968)

Personal information
- Born: 2 February 1968 (age 58)

Cycling career
- Sport: Cycling

- Korean name
- Hangul: 홍영미
- Hanja: 洪英美
- RR: Hong Yeongmi
- MR: Hong Yŏngmi

Hong Yeong-mi (born 2 February 1968) is a South Korean former cyclist. She competed in the women's individual road race at the 1988 Summer Olympics. She was also part of the South Korean delegation at the 1990 Asian Games.
