= Laines-aux-Bois =

Commune in Grand Est, France

- Commune
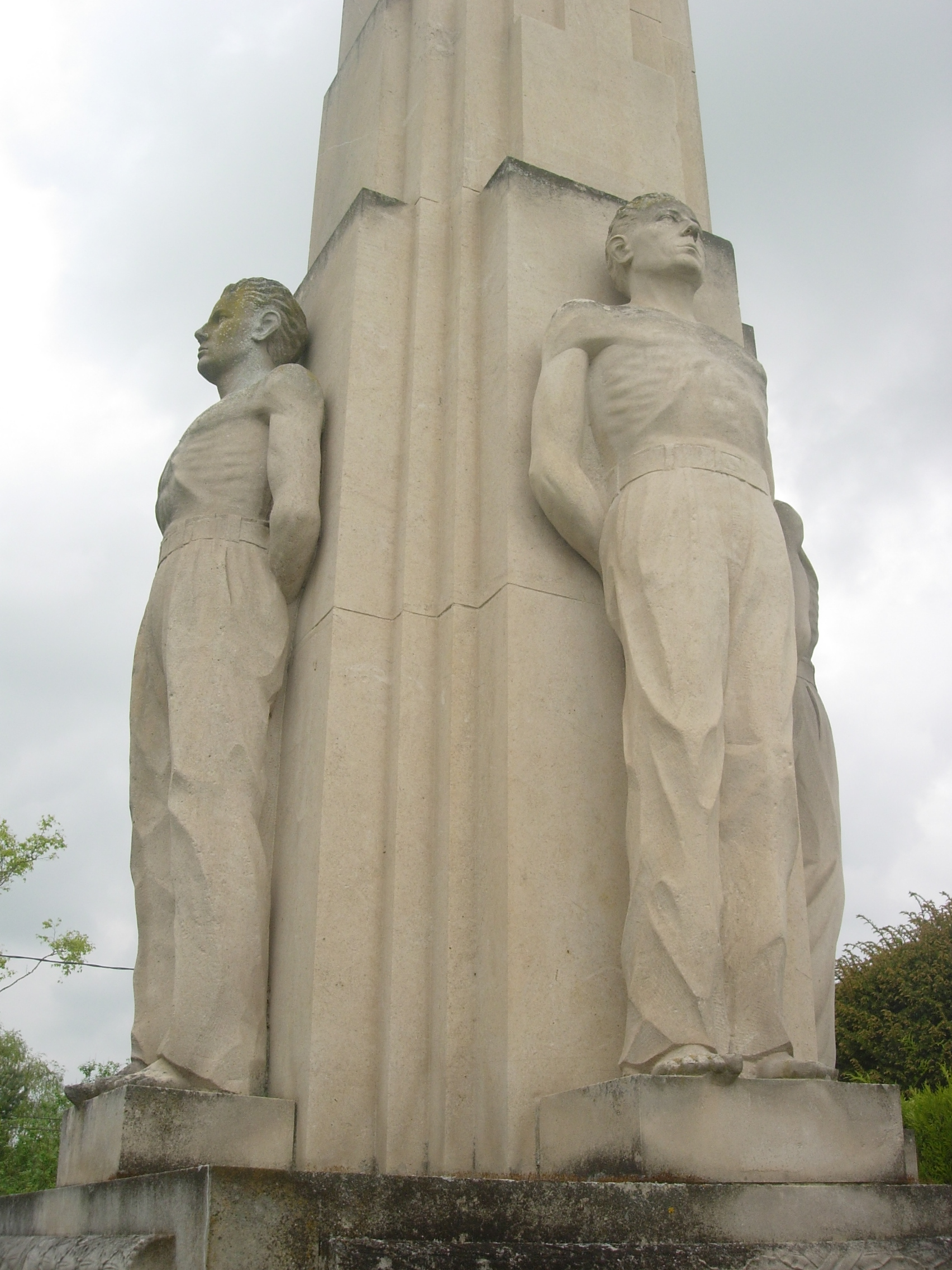
- Resistance monument
- Location of Laines-aux-Bois
- Location within France Location within Grand Est
- Coordinates: 48°14′03″N 3°59′19″E
- Country: France
- Region: Grand Est
- Department: Aube
- Arrondissement: Troyes
- Canton: Les Riceys
- Intercommunality: CA Troyes Champagne Métropole

Government
  - Mayor (2020–2026): Anne-Sophie Gauthier
- Area^{1}: 16.43 km^{2} (6.34 sq mi)
- Elevation: 140 m (460 ft)
- Highest elevation: 277 m (909 ft)
- Lowest elevation: 123 m (404 ft)
- Population (2023): 528
  - Density: 32.1/km^{2} (83.2/sq mi)
- Time zone: UTC+01:00 (CET)
  - Summer (DST): UTC+02:00 (CEST)
- INSEE/Postal code: 10186 /10120
- ^{1} French Land Register data, which excludes lakes, ponds, glaciers > 1 km^{2} (0.386 sq mi or 247 acres) and river estuaries.

Laines-aux-Bois (French pronunciation: [lɛn o bwa]) is a commune in the Aube department in north-central France.

== Population ==
Historical population
Year	Pop.	±% p.a.
1968	305	—
1975	359	+2.36%
1982	397	+1.45%
1990	416	+0.59%
1999	461	+1.15%
2007	499	+1.00%
2012	510	+0.44%
2017	523	+0.50%
2023	528	+0.16%
Source: INSEE

== See also ==
- Communes of the Aube department
