= Tamara Polyakova =

Ukrainian/Soviet cyclist

Personal information
- Born: 27 August 1960 (age 65) Chernivtsi, Ukrainian SSR
Medal record
Representing Soviet Union
Women's Road cycling
World Championships
Gold medal – first place	1987 Villach	Team time trial
Gold medal – first place	1989 Chambéry	Team time trial
Summer Universiade
Silver medal – second place	1983 Edmonton	Road race
Bronze medal – third place	1983 Edmonton	Individual pursuit
Women's Track cycling
World Championships
Silver medal – second place	1981 Brno	Individual pursuit

Tamara Eduardovna Polyakova (Russian: Тамара Эдуардовна Полякова; born 27 August 1960) is a Ukrainian road and track cyclist. At the 1983 Summer Universiade she won the silver medal in the road race and won bronze in the individual pursuit. Poliakova won the silver medal in the individual pursuit at the 1981 UCI Track Cycling World Championships and became world champion on the road in the women's team time trial in 1987 and 1989.
