= Antwerpen-Luchtbal railway station =

Railway station in Antwerp, Belgium

Antwerpen-Luchtbal
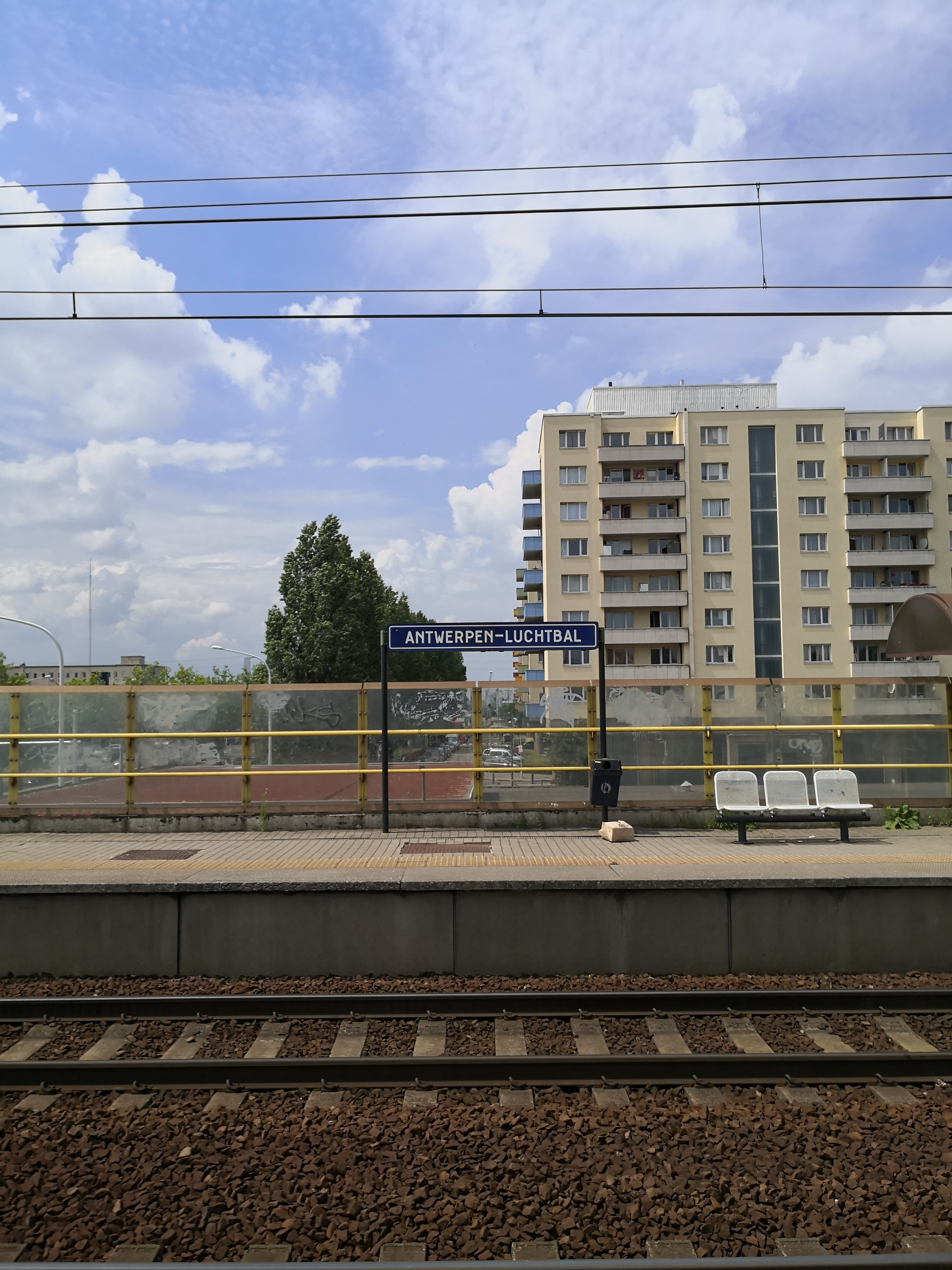

General information
- Location: Antwerp, Antwerp, Belgium
- Coordinates: 51°14′40″N 4°25′28″E
- Owner: National Railway Company of Belgium
- Lines: Line 25, Line 12, Line 27A
- Platforms: 6
- Tracks: 6

History
- Opened: 1 February 1932
- Rebuilt: 2006 (Moved from Manchesterlaan to Groenendaallaan)
Location

Antwerp-Luchtbal is a railway station in the north of the city of Antwerp, Antwerp, Belgium. The station opened on 1 February 1932 on the Antwerp–Lage Zwaluwe railway, known in Belgium as Line 12; it is also located on Line 27A, a freight line to the port of Antwerp; and on HSL 4. Since the opening of the railway tunnel under Antwerp Central railway station it is also the endpoint of Line 25 from Brussels-North railway station.

== History ==
The station was originally located on the Manchesterlaan but this station was closed and a new station opened on the Groenendaallaan. This was in connection with the opening of the High Speed Line to the Netherlands (Line 4).

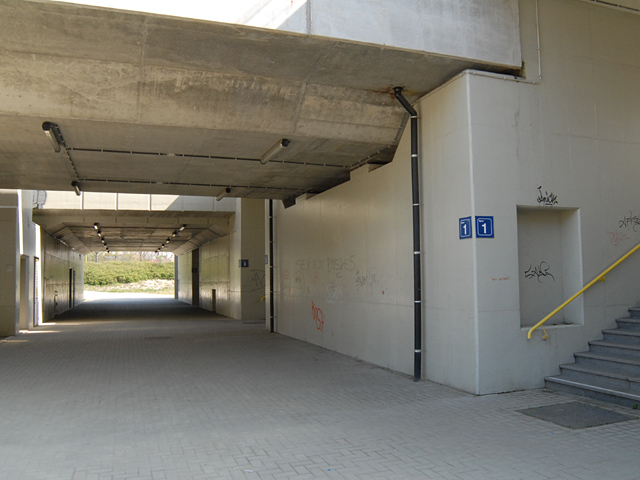
Underpass under the platforms in 2007

Train services continued via Antwerpen-Dam to the Central Station until December 2011, however due to ongoing infrastructure work only freight trains operate via this route and the stations are now closed to passenger traffic. (Antwerpen-Schijnpoort is still used, on the west side (Line 12) for cleaning and maintenance of passenger trains, and on the east side (Line 27A) as a shunting yard for goods). Passenger trains now continue from here straight to the Central Station, operating via the tunnel.

== Train services ==
The station is served by the following services:

- Intercity services (IC-05) Essen - Antwerp - Brussels - Charleroi (weekdays)
- S services (S32) Roosendaal - Essen - Antwerp - Puurs (all days)
- S services (S32) Essen - Antwerp - Puurs (weekdays)
- S services (S35) Antwerp - Noorderkempen (weekdays rush hour)

== Tram services ==
Tram line 6 serves the station, this is operated by De Lijn.

== Bus services ==
Bus services 600, 601, 602, 610, 620, 621, 640, 641, 642 and 650 serve the station, these are operated by De Lijn.
