= Brigitte Gyr-Gschwend =

Swiss cyclist

Personal information
- Born: 9 August 1964 (age 62)

Cycling career
- Sport: Cycling

Brigitte Gyr-Gschwend (born 9 August 1964) is a Swiss former cyclist. She competed in the women's individual road race at the 1988 Summer Olympics.
