= Els Mertens =

Belgian cyclist

Personal information
- Full name: Els Mertens
- Born: 14 August 1966 (age 60) Brecht, Belgium

Cycling career
- Sport: Cycling
- Role: Rider

Els Mertens (born 14 August 1966) is a former Belgian racing cyclist. She finished in third place in the Belgian National Road Race Championships in 1987 and 1989.
