= Brecht, Belgium =

Brecht
- Municipality
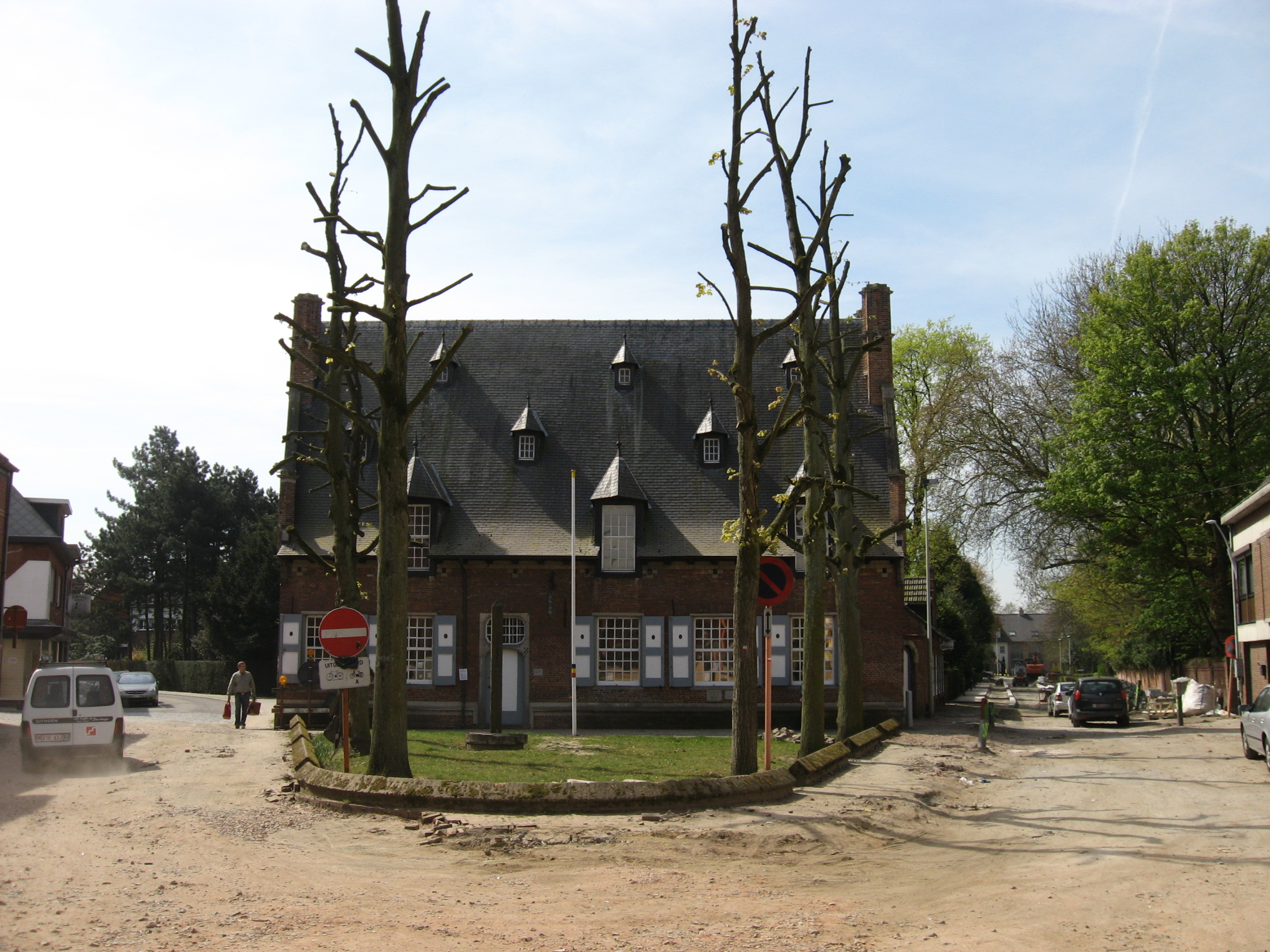

- Flag Coat of arms

- Location of Brecht in the province of Antwerp
- Interactive map of Brecht
- Location in Belgium
- Coordinates: 51°21′N 04°38′E
- Country: Belgium
- Community: Flemish Community
- Region: Flemish Region
- Province: Antwerp
- Arrondissement: Antwerp

Government
  - Mayor: Frans Van Looveren (Nu2960)
  - Governing parties: N-VA, CD&V-CDB

Area
  - Total: 91.46 km^{2} (35.31 sq mi)

Population (2020-01-01)
  - Total: 29,454
  - Density: 322.0/km^{2} (834.1/sq mi)
- Postal codes: 2960
- NIS code: 11009
- Area codes: 03
- Website: www.brecht.be

Brecht (Dutch pronunciation: [brɛxt]) is a municipality located in the Belgian province of Antwerp. The municipality comprises the towns of Brecht proper, Sint-Job-in-'t-Goor and Sint-Lenaarts. In 2021, Brecht had a total population of 29,809. The total area is 90.84 km^{2}.

Brecht is a fast-growing municipality in the north of the Antwerp province, near the Dutch border. Noorderkempen, a railway station on the HSL 4, opened on 15 June 2009.

== Images ==
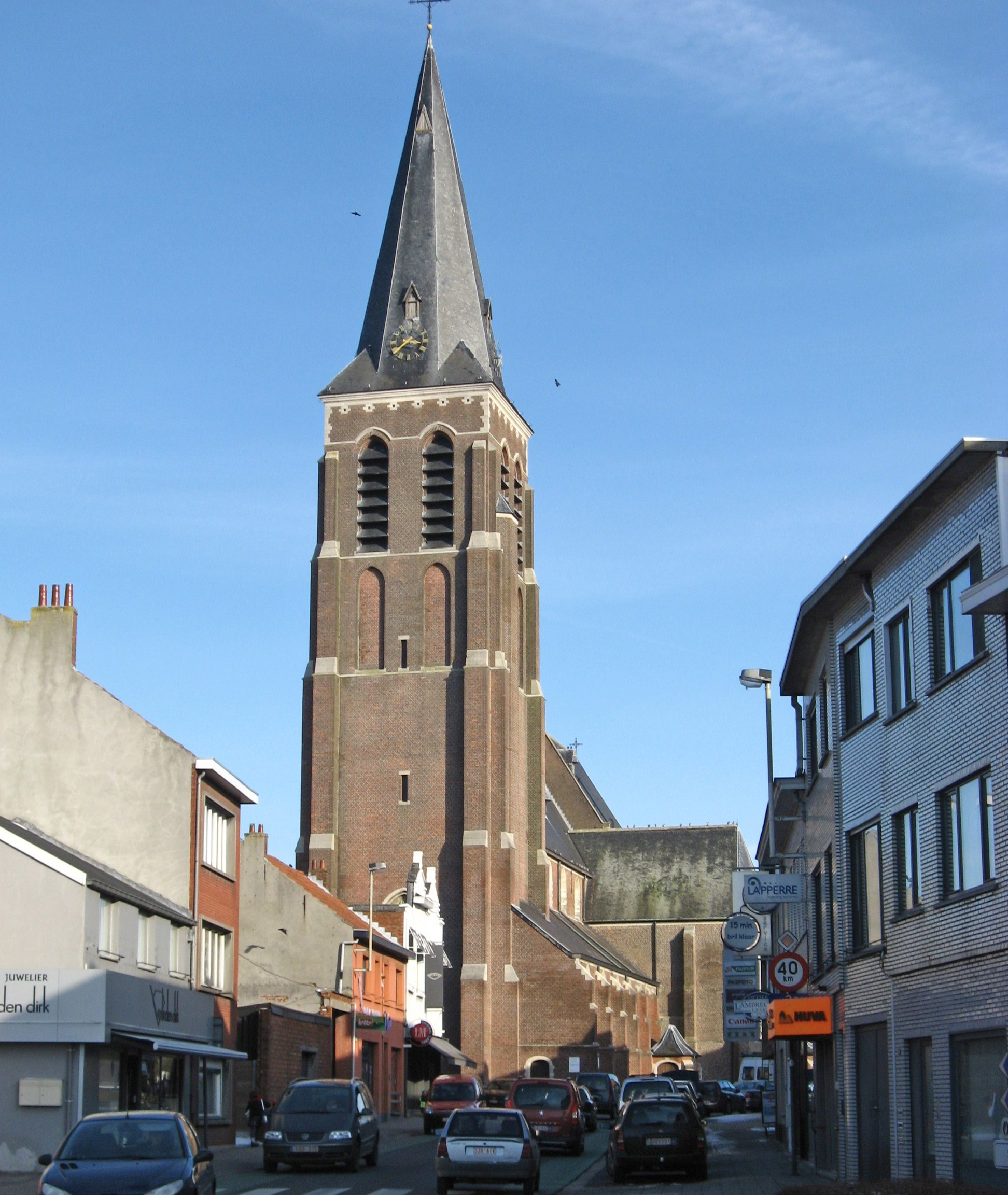
Sint-Michielskerk in Brecht

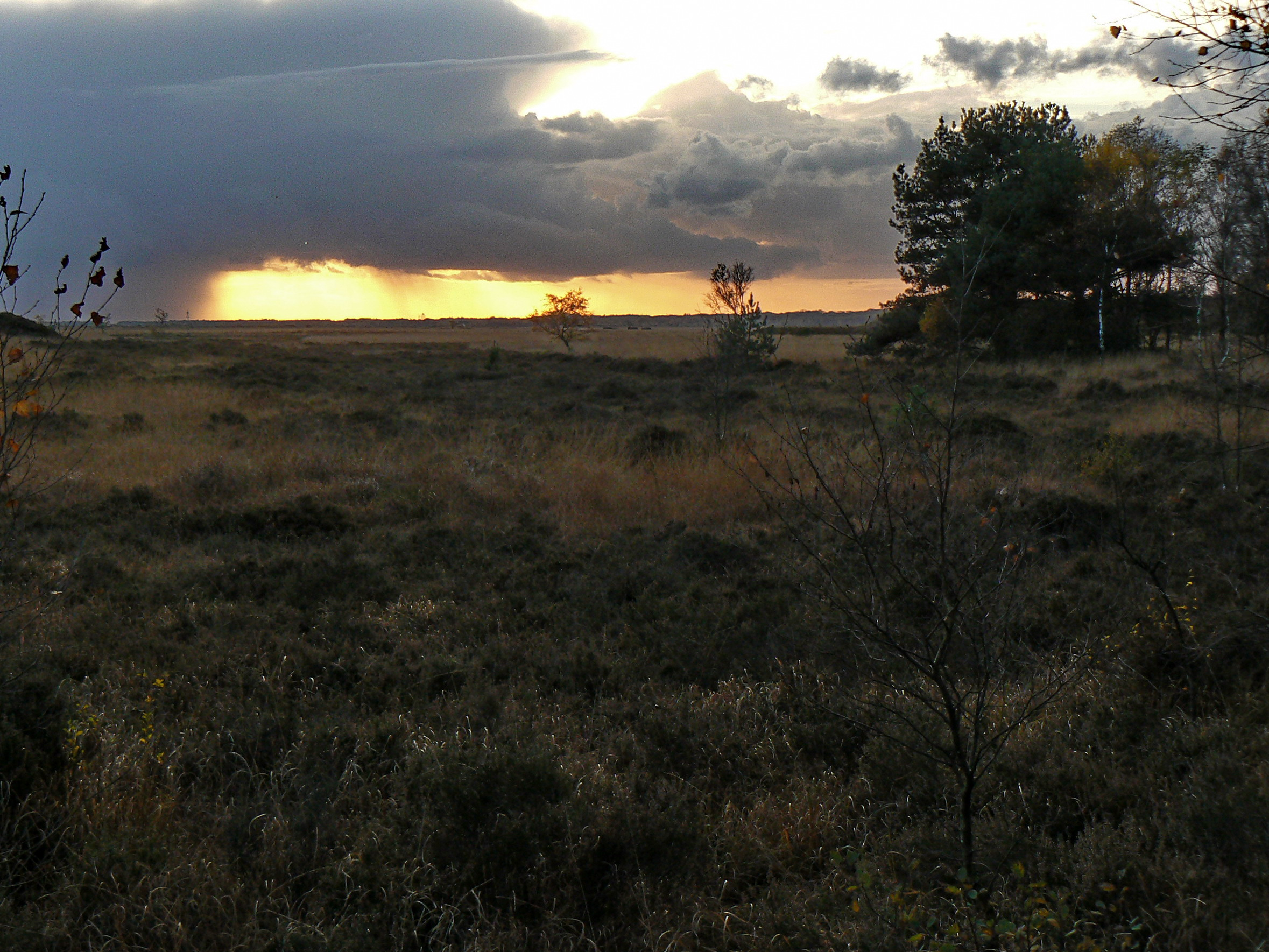
Nature reserve Groot Schietveld

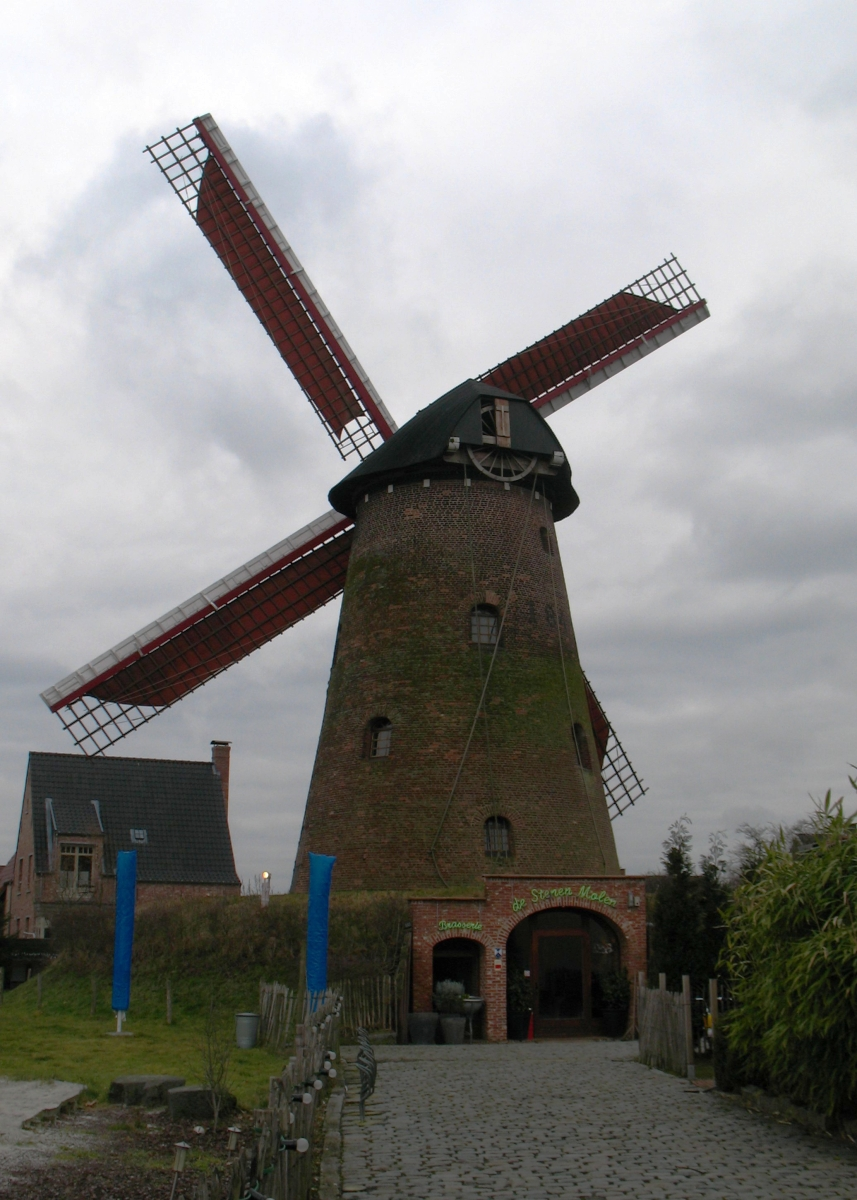
Windmill in Brecht

== Notable people ==
- Jan van der Noot (1539–1595), writer and poet, born in Brecht
- Leonard Lessius (1554–1623), moral theologian, born in Brecht
- Walter Van Beirendonck (1957–), fashion designer and one of the Antwerp Six
- Jean Kockerols (1958–), Roman Catholic bishop

== Climate ==
Climate data for Brecht (1991–2020 normals)
Month	Jan	Feb	Mar	Apr	May	Jun	Jul	Aug	Sep	Oct	Nov	Dec	Year
Mean daily maximum °C (°F)	6.4 (43.5)	7.4 (45.3)	11.1 (52.0)	15.4 (59.7)	18.9 (66.0)	21.6 (70.9)	23.5 (74.3)	23.4 (74.1)	19.9 (67.8)	15.2 (59.4)	10.2 (50.4)	6.8 (44.2)	15.0 (59.0)
Daily mean °C (°F)	3.6 (38.5)	4.1 (39.4)	6.8 (44.2)	10.1 (50.2)	13.9 (57.0)	16.7 (62.1)	18.7 (65.7)	18.3 (64.9)	15.1 (59.2)	11.2 (52.2)	7.1 (44.8)	4.2 (39.6)	10.8 (51.4)
Mean daily minimum °C (°F)	0.9 (33.6)	0.7 (33.3)	2.6 (36.7)	4.8 (40.6)	8.8 (47.8)	11.8 (53.2)	13.8 (56.8)	13.3 (55.9)	10.4 (50.7)	7.3 (45.1)	4.0 (39.2)	1.6 (34.9)	6.7 (44.1)
Average precipitation mm (inches)	81.3 (3.20)	74.0 (2.91)	65.1 (2.56)	48.5 (1.91)	67.0 (2.64)	80.5 (3.17)	87.9 (3.46)	91.1 (3.59)	79.7 (3.14)	79.4 (3.13)	91.1 (3.59)	103.6 (4.08)	949.4 (37.38)
Average precipitation days (≥ 1.0 mm)	13.6	12.4	11.2	9.2	10.2	10.5	11.0	11.1	10.6	11.7	14.0	15.2	140.8
Mean monthly sunshine hours	61	78	134	190	219	217	222	208	162	116	67	51	1,725
Source: Royal Meteorological Institute

== See also ==
- Brecht Abbey
- Noorderkempen railway station
