= Paula Westher =

Swedish cyclist

Personal information
- Born: 16 April 1965 (age 61) Malmö, Sweden

Cycling career
- Sport: Cycling
- Current team: Retired

Major wins
- One-day races and Classics National Road Race Championships (1985, 1986)

Paula Westher (born 16 April 1965) is a Swedish former cyclist. She competed at the 1984 Summer Olympics and the 1988 Summer Olympics. She won the Nordic Championship in 1989.

== Major results ==
1983
National Junior road Championships

1st Road race
1st Time trial

1985
1st National Road Race Championships
6th Overall Tour de l'Aude Cycliste Féminin
1986
1st National Road Race Championships
4th Overall Tour de l'Aude Cycliste Féminin
9th Overall Postgiro féminin
1987
6th Overall Postgiro féminin
1988
3rd National Road Race Championships
4th Overall Postgiro féminin
7th (TTT) World championships
1989
1st Prologue Giro d'Italia Femminile
2nd National Road Race Championships
5th Overall Thüringen Ladies Tour
7th (TTT) World championships
1990
5th (TTT) World championships
1991
10th (TTT) World championships
