= Sylvie Slos =

Belgian cyclist

Personal information
- Full name: Sylvie Slos
- Born: 4 June 1965 (age 61) Momignies, Belgium

Cycling career
- Sport: Cycling
- Role: Rider

Sylvie Slos (born 4 June 1965) is a former Belgian racing cyclist. She won the Belgian national road race title in 1989.
