= HSL 4 =

Belgian high-speed rail line

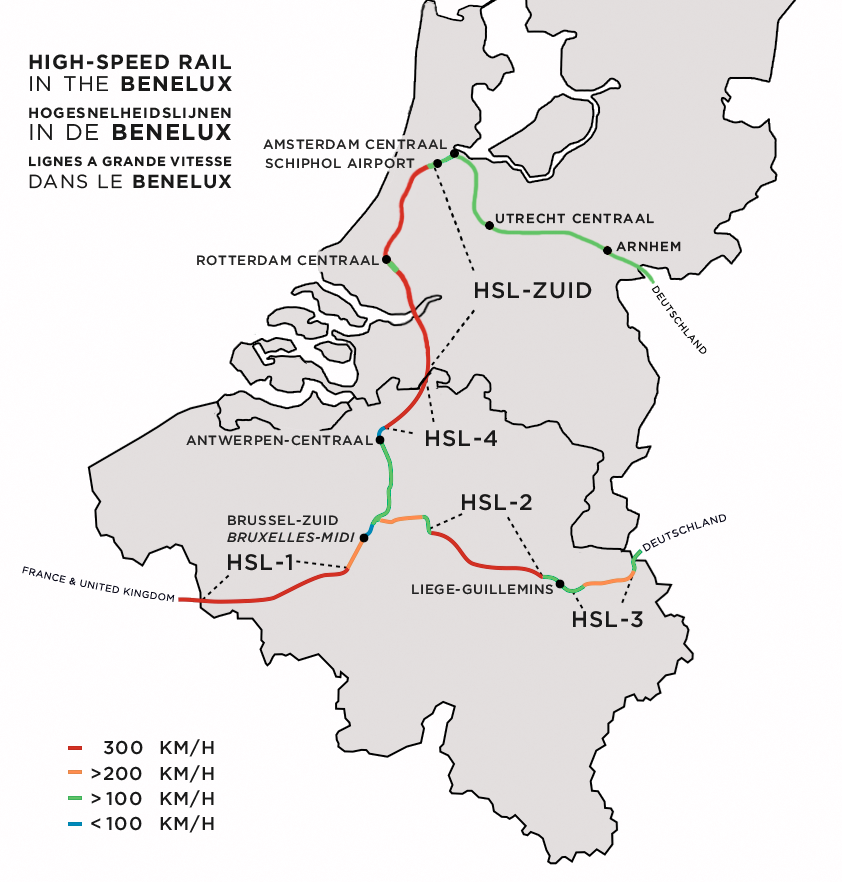
- The HSL 4 and HSL-Zuid railways

Overview
- Status: Operational
- Locale: Belgium
- Termini: Antwerp-Luchtbal station; Dutch border

Service
- Operator: National Railway Company of Belgium

History
- Opened: 2009

Technical
- Line length: 36 km (22 mi)
- Num of tracks: Double track
- Track gauge: 1,435 mm (4 ft 8 1/2 in) standard gauge
- Electrification: Overhead line, 25 kV 50 Hz AC
- Operating speed: 300 km/h (186 mph)

HSL 4 (Dutch: Hogesnelheidslijn 4, lit. 'High-Speed Line 4') is a 36-kilometre (22 mi) high-speed railway in Belgium running from Antwerp to the Dutch border. Together with the HSL-Zuid in the Netherlands, it forms the Schiphol–Antwerp high-speed railway. The line allows speeds of up to 300 kilometres per hour (190 mph) and is used by both domestic and international services.

Initially planned to open in 2005, HSL 4 entered public service in 2009. It is used by Intercity Direct, EuroCity and Eurostar services, providing fast connections between cities such as Amsterdam, Rotterdam, Brussels, Paris, and London. On weekdays, it is also used by local domestic trains terminating at Noorderkempen. The line was previously served by fast SNCB InterCity services and the discontinued Fyra service, both of which were replaced by Intercity Direct.

Although designed for high-speed travel, a short section near Antwerp requires trains to reduce speed due to conventional infrastructure. The line uses the 25 kV 50 Hz AC electrification system common to most northern European corridors, along with European Train Control System signalling.

== Route ==
The high-speed HSL 4 begins just north of Antwerp, at a connection with the Antwerp–Lage Zwaluwe railway near Luchtbal station, and runs for 35.9 kilometres (22.3 mi) to the Dutch border.

=== From Brussels to Antwerp ===
Though HSL4 begins in Antwerp, it is part of a Paris-Brussels-Amsterdam corridor. High speed trains like Eurostar (formerly Thalys), upon departing Brussels for Amsterdam, first use the existing, conventional track, electrified at 3 kV DC.

From Brussels South station, trains travel northwards through the Brussels-Central and Brussels-North stations. At Schaarbeek the line splits in two; the eastern branch continues to Liège and the German border, the northern branch towards Antwerp and the Dutch border. Between Brussels and Antwerp (47 kilometres (29 mi)), trains travel at 160 kilometres per hour (99 mph) on line 25N and then the upgraded existing line 25 (with the exception of a few segments where a speed limit of 100–120 km/h (62–75 mph) is imposed).

=== From Antwerp north ===
In Antwerp, a tunnel has been constructed underneath the city to permit high-speed trains to run directly through Antwerpen-Centraal to the new high-speed line north, an extension of line 25 until Antwerpen-Luchtbal railway station, after which line 4 (HSL 4) starts. Trains enter the 1.5-kilometre (0.93 mi) long, two-tube tunnel past Berchem at 90 kilometres per hour (56 mph). They exit the tunnel at 40 km/h (25 mph), it seems due to stability and infiltration concerns.

The line surfaces at Antwerpen-Dam as line 25, and after crossing the Albert Canal, crosses the existing Antwerp-Essen line at 120 km/h (75 mph). At the E19/A12 motorway junction, trains leave the regular line to run on new dedicated high-speed tracks to the Dutch border (40 kilometres (25 mi) away) at up to 300 kilometres per hour (186 mph). The route parallels the E19 motorway until the border, which has required the building of several bridges.

The line passes through Schoten, Brasschaat, Brecht, Wuustwezel, and Hoogstraten, before crossing the border into the Netherlands and connecting to the Dutch HSL-Zuid.

== Stations ==
Antwerpen-Centraal station has been completely reorganised. A tunnel has been constructed to permit the passage of trains under the city, additionally creating a subterranean junction between Antwerpen-Berchem and Antwerpen-Dam railway station, passing through Antwerpen-Centraal. With these works completed, the station has four levels and 14 tracks:

- level +1 (the original station) has 6 terminating tracks, arranged as two groups of three (line 59/1 to Ghent and line 12 to the depot, workshop and cleaning station in Antwerp-Schijnpoort) separated by an opening allowing natural light to reach the lower levels
- level 0 contains ticketing facilities and commercial space
- level −1 (7 meters below road level) has 4 terminating tracks, also arranged as two groups (line 27 to Brussels, for services terminating in Antwerp).
- level −2 (18 meters below road level) has 4 tracks, which end up in the two-track-wide tunnel under the city (used by high-speed, InterCity and local passenger trains between the North and South of Antwerp — freight trains go around the East of Antwerp on line 27A to the harbour)

The HSL 4 is the only high-speed line in Belgium that features an intermediate station at Noorderkempen (municipality Brecht, Belgium) for use in regular speed passenger service.

== Tunnel Peerdsbos ('Solar Tunnel') ==
The line features a 'Solar Tunnel' near Antwerp. The above-ground tunnel Peerdsbos is comparable to an avalanche gallery except instead of snow it protects the trains from falling trees and the highway traffic on the E19. It was constructed as an alternative to felling parts of the nearby forest. The 'tunnel' is unique as it is covered with 16,000 solar panels. The line's operator claim this provides 3300 MWh of electricity per year and cuts CO_{2} emissions by 2400 tonnes a year.

== See also ==
- High-speed rail in Belgium
