= Angela Ranft =

German cyclist

Personal information
- Born: 7 December 1969 (age 56) Weißwasser, East Germany

Cycling career
- Sport: Cycling

Angela Ranft (born 7 December 1969) is a German former cyclist. She competed in the women's individual road race at the 1988 Summer Olympics.
