= 1987 UCI Road World Championships =

- Location within Kärnten Location within Austria
- Venue: Villach, Austria
- Coordinates: 46°37′N 13°51′E
- Events: 5

The 1987 UCI Road World Championships took place in Villach, Austria. Stephen Roche completed the rare Triple Crown of Cycling, winning the Giro d'Italia and the Tour de France before winning the Men's Road Race, and was only the second cyclist to achieve it following Eddy Merckx in 1974.

In the same period, the 1987 UCI Track Cycling World Championships were organized in Vienna.

== Events summary ==
Event	Gold		Silver		Bronze	
Men's Events
Professional Road Race	Stephen Roche; Ireland	6h 50' 02"	Moreno Argentin; Italy	+ 1"	Juan Fernández; Spain	s.t.
Team Time Trial	Italy	-	Soviet Union	-	Austria	-
Amateur Road Race	Richard Vivien; France	-	Hartmut Bölts; West Germany	-	Alex Pedersen; Denmark	-
Women's Events
Road Race	Jeannie Longo-Ciprelli; France	1h 46' 40"	Heleen Hage; Netherlands	+ 12"	Connie Meijer; Netherlands	s.t.
Team Time Trial	Soviet Union; Nadezhda Kibardina; Alla Jakovleva; Tamara Poliakova; Lyubov Pugovichnikova	-	United States	-	Italy	-
