= Astrid Danielsen =

Norwegian cyclist (born 1968)

Personal information
- Born: 1 November 1968 (age 57) Trondheim, Norway

Cycling career
- Sport: Cycling

Astrid Danielsen (born 1 November 1968) is a Norwegian cyclist. She was born in Trondheim. She competed in the women's individual road race at the 1988 Summer Olympics.
