= Jutta Niehaus =

German cyclist (born 1964)

Personal information
- Born: 1 October 1964 (age 62) Bocholt, West Germany

Cycling career
- Sport: Cycling
Medal record
Women's cycling
Representing West Germany
Olympic Games
| Silver medal – second place | 1988 Seoul | Individual Road Race |

Judith ("Jutta") Niehaus (born 1 October 1964) is a retired racing cyclist from West Germany, who represented her native country at the 1988 Summer Olympics in Seoul, South Korea. There she won the silver medal in the women's individual road race, losing to the Netherlands' Monique Knol in the sprint. She was born in Bocholt, North Rhine-Westphalia.
