= High-speed rail in Belgium =

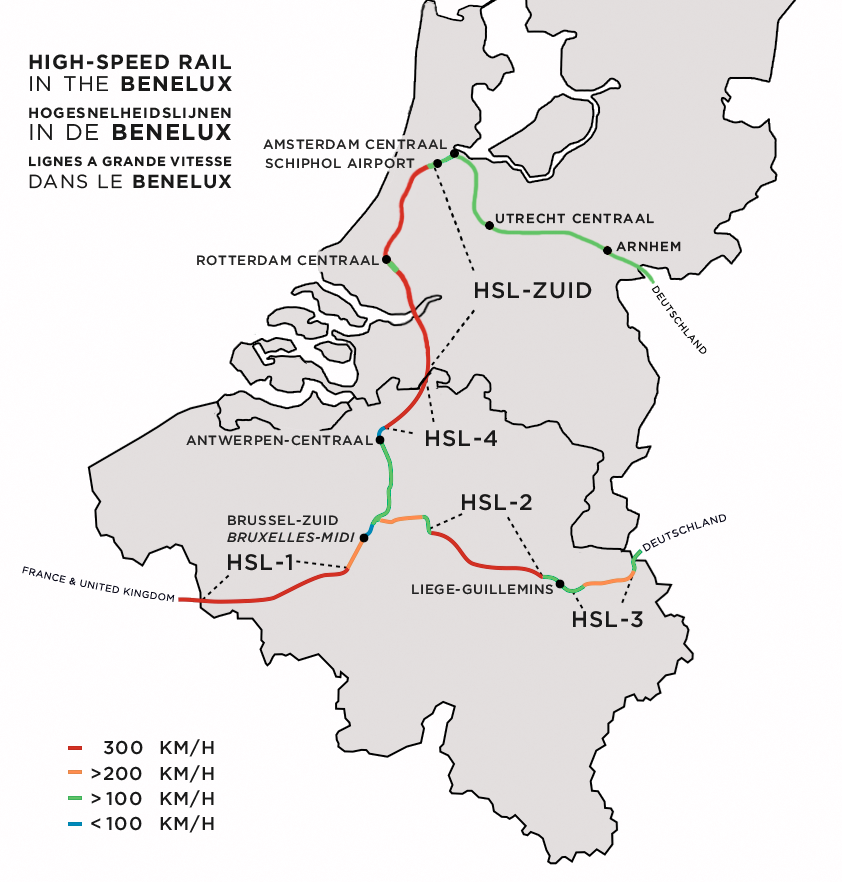
High-speed rail in Belgium and the Netherlands

Belgium's high-speed rail network provides mostly international connections from Brussels to France, Germany and The Netherlands. The high-speed network began with the opening of the HSL 1 to France in 1997, and since then high-speed lines have been extended towards Germany with HSL 2 in 2002, HSL 3 from Liège to the German border in 2009, and HSL 4 from Antwerp to the Dutch border in 2009.

== Services ==
Three international high-speed train services currently operate in Belgium: Eurostar, InterCityExpress (ICE), and TGV. All operators stop at Brussels-South, Belgium's largest train station. Some services also stop at Liège and Antwerp. However, international operators are not permitted to sell tickets for journeys between two Belgian cities; passengers must use a domestic InterCity (IC) train, which operates on the same high-speed lines. Eurostar connects Brussels to Amsterdam, Cologne (Köln), Düsseldorf, London, Paris and Rotterdam. The German ICE operates between Brussels and Frankfurt via Cologne (Köln). The French TGV operates direct services from Brussels to Nantes, Marseilles, Perpignan, Rennes and Strasbourg, serving over 25 stations along the routes.

== Lines ==
There are four high-speed lines in Belgium which support 260–300 km/h (160–190 mph) operation. All are electrified at 25 kV 50 Hz AC, unlike most of the rest of the Belgian rail network which uses 3,000 V DC.

=== HSL 1 ===
HSL 1 connects Brussels with the French border. 88 km (55 mi) long (71 km (44 mi) dedicated high-speed tracks, 17 km (11 mi) modernised lines), it began service on 14 December 1997. The line has appreciably shortened rail journeys, the journey from Paris to Brussels now taking 1:22. In combination with the LGV Nord, it has also impacted international journeys to France and London, ensuring high-speed through-running by Eurostar and TGV trainsets. The total construction cost was €1.42 billion.

=== HSL 2 ===
HSL 2 runs between Leuven and Ans. 95 km (59 mi) long (61 km (38 mi) dedicated high-speed tracks, 34 km (21 mi) modernised lines, it began service on 15 December 2002. Combined with HSL 3 to the German border, the combined eastward high speed lines have greatly accelerated journeys between Brussels, Paris and Germany. HSL 2 is used by international Eurostar and ICE trains as well as domestic InterCity services.

=== HSL 3 ===
HSL 3 connects Liège to the German border. It is 56 km (35 mi) long and is made up of 42 km (26 mi) of dedicated high-speed tracks and 14 km (8.7 mi) of modernised lines. It was completed on 15 December 2007, but trains did not start to use it until June 14, 2009. HSL 3 is used by international Eurostar and ICE trains only.

=== HSL 4 ===
HSL 4 connects Antwerp north to the Dutch border where it meets the HSL-Zuid. It is 87 km (54 mi) long, comprising 40 km (25 mi) dedicated high speed tracks and 47 km (29 mi) modernised lines. Mostly completed in 2007, the opening of the line was delayed till December 2009 due to problems with signalling. HSL 4 is used by international Eurostar and ICE trains as well as domestic InterCity services. Initially, NS Hispeed (now NS International) planned using the newly ordered V250 for the fast Fyra train service between Brussels, Antwerp, Rotterdam and Amsterdam. Due to technical problems with the model, this plan was scrapped. The NS has ordered 20 new ICNG trains for service on this route. Between Brussels and Antwerp (47 km (29 mi)), trains travel at 160 km/h (99 mph) on the upgraded existing line (with the exception of a few segments where a speed limit of 120 km/h (75 mph) is imposed). At the E19/A12 motorway junction, trains leave the regular line to run on new dedicated high-speed tracks to the Dutch border (40 km (25 mi)) at 300 km/h (190 mph).

=== 25N ===
Railway line 25N, part of the Diabolo project, is under construction between Schaerbeek, just north of Brussels and Mechelen, just south of Antwerp. It is not a true high-speed rail corridor, but is being built to accommodate speeds up to 220 kilometres per hour (140 mph). A related project to renovate Mechelen railway station includes construction of tracks at the station's edge reserved for passing high-speed trains.

When completed, this line will complete a near-continuous high-speed connection between Amsterdam, Brussels, and London or Paris, with exceptions where trains run on conventional tracks in densely populated areas—namely between Mechelen and Antwerp, and between Schiphol and Amsterdam. Trains are also unable to reach full high speed near urban stations; for example, on the short sections north of Brussels to Schaerbeek and north of Antwerp to Luchtbal. Additionally, around Rotterdam station, tight track curves restrict full-speed operation.

=== EuroCap-Rail ===
EuroCap-Rail is a proposed high-speed rail axis connecting Brussels, Luxembourg (city), and Strasbourg—three cities which, combined, are the homes of six of the seven institutions of the European Union and unofficially called the capitals of Europe. The axis would run along existing lines that would be upgraded for high-speed rail service.

== Stations ==
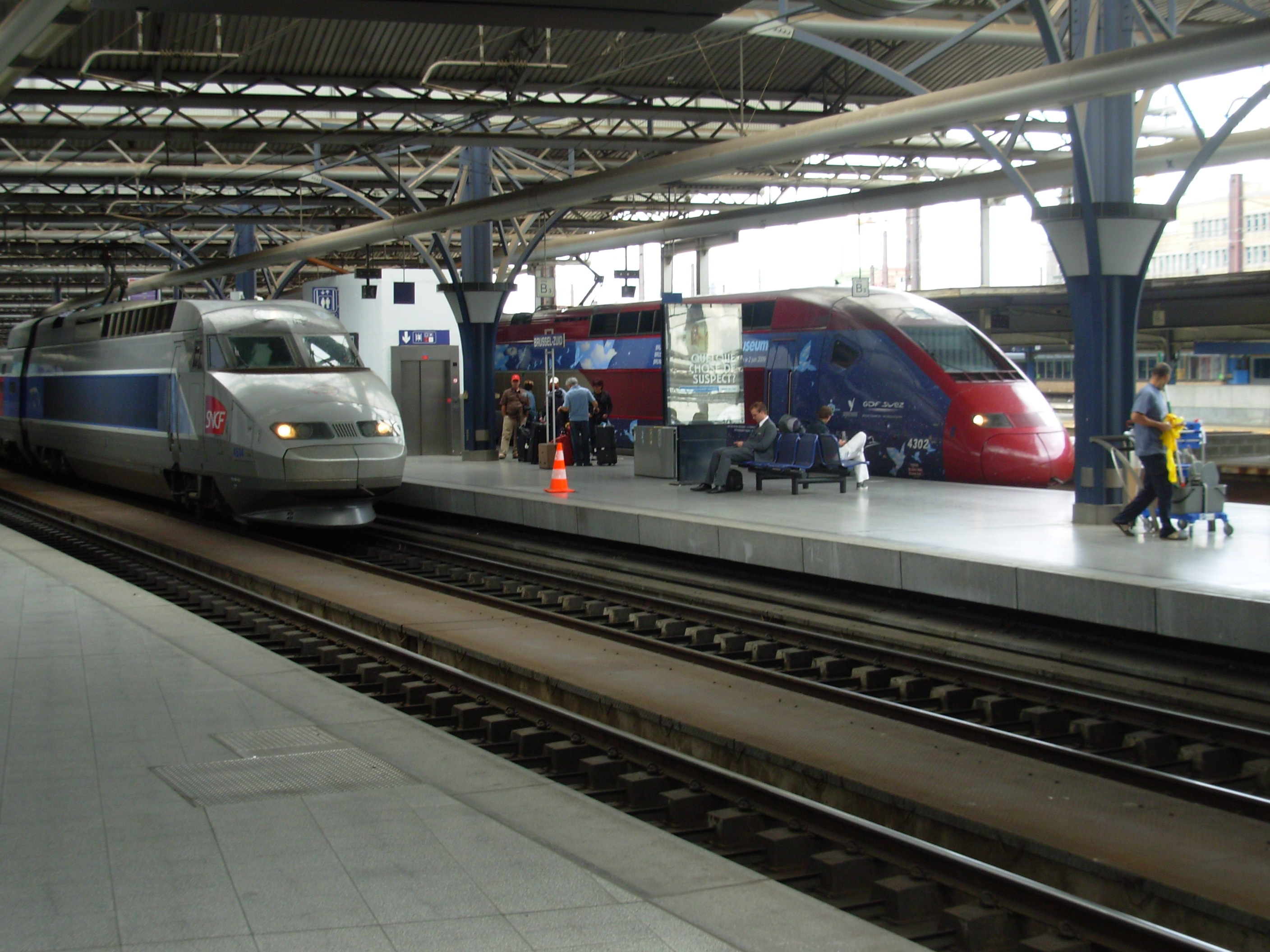
International services at Brussels-South

There are 4 stations in Belgium where high-speed trains stop:

- Antwerp-Central
- Brussels-South
- Brussels-North
- Liège-Guillemins

== See also ==
- Rail transport in Belgium
