= Intercity Direct =

Dutch higher-speed train service

Route map
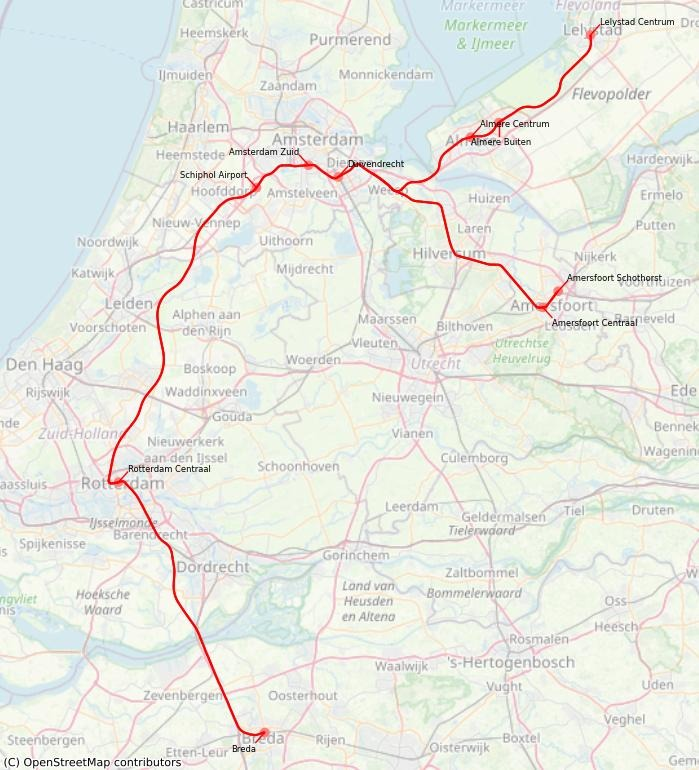

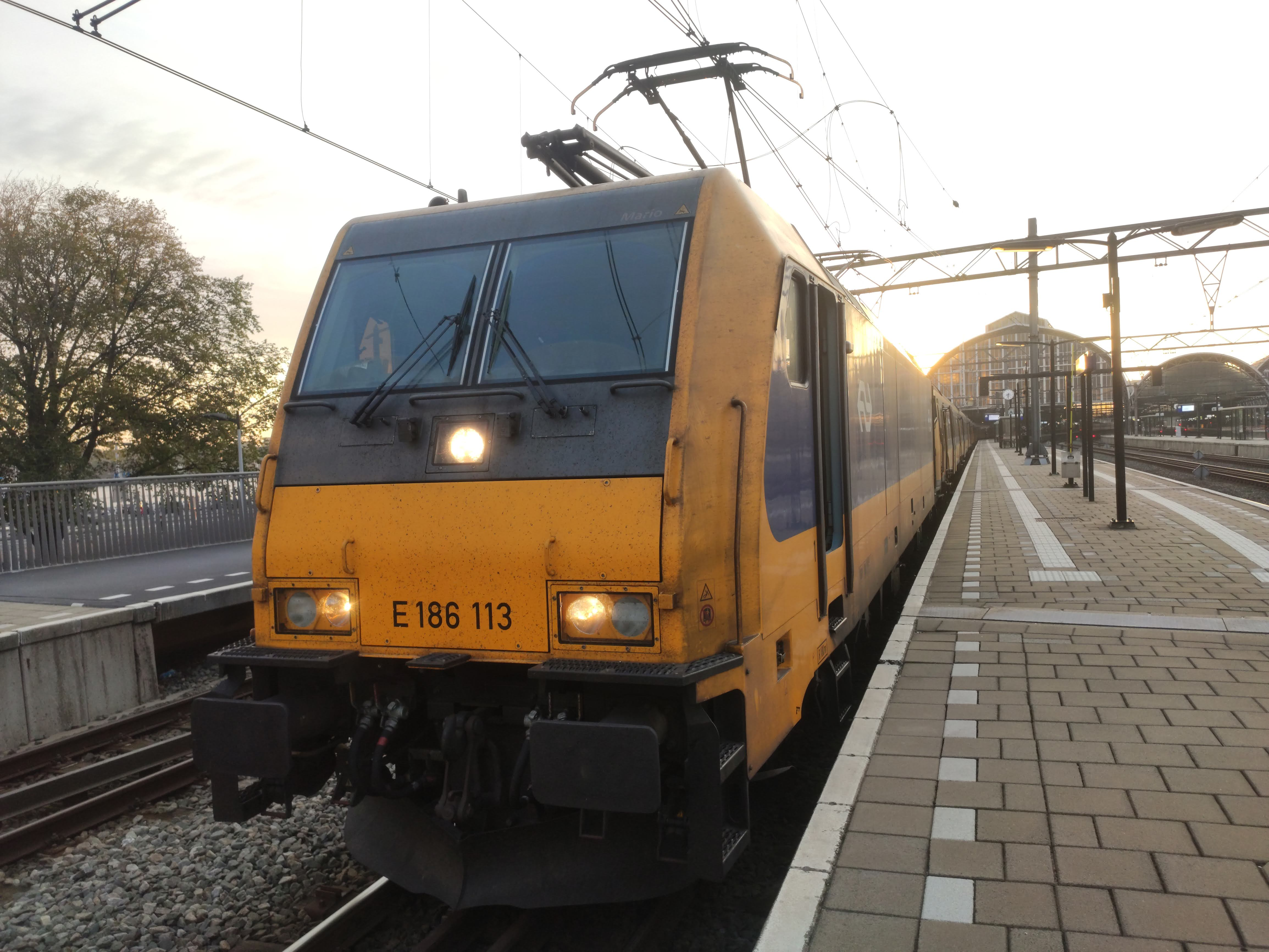
Traxx locomotive with ICRm carriages ready for departure at Amsterdam Centraal

Intercity Direct, abbreviated to ICD, is a Dutch category of higher-speed train service, operating on the HSL-Zuid and connecting Amersfoort Schothorst / Lelystad to Amsterdam Zuid, Schiphol Airport, Rotterdam Centraal and Breda. Some services cross the border with Belgium, extending to Brussels-South. It is part of NS International.

In December 2013, the former Fyra was rebranded to Intercity Direct.

== History ==
The Intercity Direct train service uses the HSL-Zuid which went into service 7 September 2009. An hourly domestic service branded Fyra by operator NS Hispeed was started on 7 September 2009 between Amsterdam and Rotterdam using TRAXX-locomotives and ICR-carriages. Initially the service was hourly and weekdays only. On 12 April 2010 service expanded to Saturdays and Sundays. As of 4 October 2010, frequency increased to twice hourly. Service was extended to Breda on 3 April 2011.

An international service also known as Fyra between Amsterdam and Brussels started 9 December 2012 using V250 rolling stock of AnsaldoBreda. From 17 January 2013, this service had to be pulled due to undercarriage damage caused by high velocity with ice and snow. As of June 2013, international Fyra service has been permanently suspended by both Dutch and Belgian railways.

Due to the perceived bad reputation of the Fyra brand, the domestic service rebranded into Intercity Direct as of December 2013.

As of April 2023, ICNG (Intercity New Generation) units have started replacing the locomotive-hauled services. The ICNG trains are capable of operating at speeds up to 200 km/h.

As of December 2024, Intercity Direct will no longer stop at Amsterdam Centraal due to the station's renovation. Instead, the service stops at Amsterdam Zuid and continues to Amersfoort Schothorst / Lelystad.

== Services ==
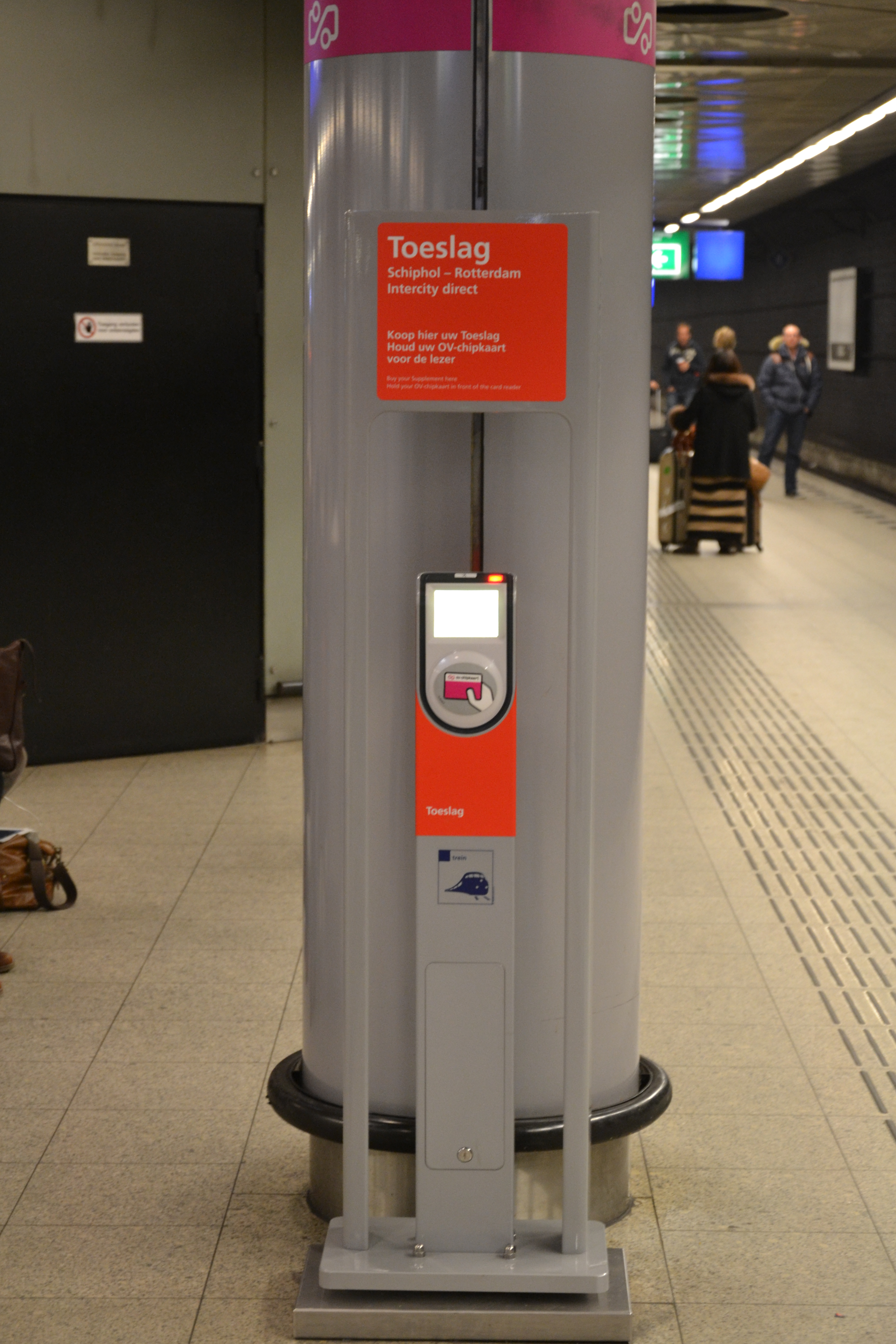
OV-Chipcard card reader for paying the Intercity Direct supplement

Intercity Direct offers the following services:

- 2 trains per hour: Amersfoort Schothorst - Amsterdam Zuid - Schiphol Airport - Rotterdam Centraal – Breda (during late evening hours not operating between Rotterdam - Breda v.v.)
- 2 trains per hour: Lelystad Centrum - Almere Centrum - Amsterdam Zuid - Schiphol Airport - Rotterdam Centraal
- 2 trains per hour: Den Haag Centraal - Rotterdam Centraal - Breda - Tilburg - Eindhoven Centraal
- 1 train per hour: (Lelystad Centrum) - Amsterdam Zuid - Schiphol Airport - Rotterdam Centraal - Antwerpen Centraal - Brussel Zuid/Midi (Intercity Brussel/Eurocity Direct, also called "Beneluxtrein")

Class	Illustration	Type	Top speed		Number	Routes operated	Built
Class	Illustration	Type	mph	km/h	Number	Routes operated	Built
Class 186 Traxx		Locomotive	100	160	NS 65 loco's NMBS 12 loco's	Amersfoort - Amsterdam - Schiphol - Rotterdam - Breda; Lelystad - Schiphol - Rotterdam (Lelystad) - Amsterdam - Rotterdam - Brussels Den Haag - Rotterdam - Breda - Eindhoven	Leased locomotives 2006–2008 NS owned locomotives (186 001 till 186 045) 2014–2016
ICRm (Prio)		Carriage	100	160	38 sets (7 or 9 wagons)	Amersfoort - Amsterdam - Schiphol - Rotterdam - Breda; Lelystad - Amsterdam - Schiphol - Rotterdam (Lelystad) - Amsterdam - Rotterdam - Brussels Den Haag - Rotterdam - Breda - Eindhoven	1980-1988
ICNG		Electric multiple unit	125	200		All Intercity direct routes	2016–present

== Supplement ==
A supplemental fare is required for any trip on the Intercity Direct that includes the Schiphol Airport–Rotterdam stretch. Single-use supplements cost €3.20 during peak hours and €1.92 during off-peak hours (2026) regardless of the class.

This supplement can be paid by touching an OV-Chipcard or Contactless payment to a "supplement pillar," which can be found on platforms from which Intercity Direct trains depart. These pillars are similar to OV-Chipcard validation machines, but contain a red "Toeslag" label. A bi-lingual sign indicates for which train the supplement is required. If the supplement was mistakenly paid, touching an OV-Chipcard to the same device within 30 minutes on the same station will cancel the purchase.

Journeys between Schiphol Airport railway station and Amsterdam Zuid, or between Rotterdam Centraal and Breda, can be made without paying the supplement. International tickets for the trains which continue to Belgium include the supplement in their cost.

== See also ==
- Rail transport in Europe
