= Infraspeed =

Infraspeed BV
- Company type: Besloten Vennootschap
- Industry: Rail transportation
- Founded: 1999
- Founder: Fluor Infrastructure BV; Siemens Nederland NV; Royal BAM Group NV
- Services: HSL-Zuid infrastructure maintenance
- Website: www.infraspeed.nl

Infraspeed is the builder and infrastructure maintenance company of the HSL-Zuid high-speed rail line in the Netherlands.

The company was created in 1999 with the express purpose of pursuing the construction and maintenance of the then-proposed HSL-Zuid. On 11 May 2001, Infraspeed was awarded several public-private partnership (PPP) contracts by the Dutch government; it was the biggest PPP initiative for the construction of a high-speed line in Europe at that time. In addition to financing, designing and constructing the line over a five year period, from 2001 to 2006, Infraspeed was also contract to provide maintenance of HSL-Zuid over a 25 year period, from 2006 to 2031. On 28 July 2006, the southern section of HSL-Zuid was formally delivered by Infraspeed. On 21 December 2006, the consortium handed over the northern section of the line to the customer, officially ending the construction phase as per schedule.

== History ==
Infraspeed BV was established during 1999 by a consortium of Fluor Infrastructure (a division of Fluor Corporation), Siemens Nederland (a partly owned subsidiary of Siemens) and Royal BAM Group. One year later, the financial investors Innisfree and Charterhouse Project Equity (renamed HSBC infrastructure Ltd in 2002 after becoming a subsidiary of HSBC) acquired a 49% shareholding in Infraspeed and playing an active role in its operations.

Infraspeed was founded with the goal of securing a major contract from the Dutch government to construct and maintain HSL-Zuid, a then-proposed 100 km high-speed line that runs from Amsterdam to the Belgian border. At the time, the project was the biggest PPP initiative for the construction of a high-speed line in Europe as well as being the most extensive PPP contract that the Dutch government has ever been involved in. The tendering process for the concession was organised by the Dutch Ministry of Transport. Stated advantages of the PPP approach was the reduced burden on government budgets and the ideal that inclusion of the private sector would bring about efficiency gains and increased innovation in its delivery.

On 11 May 2001, Infraspeed was awarded several public-private partnership (PPP) contracts by the Dutch government covering the construction and maintenance of HSL-Zuid. Specifically, the arrangements included the financing and designing of the line, as well as its construction over a five year period, from 2001 to 2006; furthermore, Infraspeed were also contracted to provide maintenance of HSL-Zuid over a 25 year period, from 2006 to 2031. The various consortium members performed various aspects of the programme; Fluor provided project management, Royal BAM Group was responsible for constructing the track infrastructure, while Siemens Nederland provided much of the lineside equipment, such as the electrical power supply system (25 kV AC), and signalling system, including European Train Control System (ETCS) and GSM-R communication apparatus. Under the terms of the contract, the Netherlands paid €4.2 billion to cover the costs of constructing the infrastructure, while Infraspeed B.V. will receive income for its work totalling €2.5 billion to provide said infrastructure and to account for the costs of investment, maintenance, capital and depreciation; however, this income was conditional on the basis of specified availability levels of 99 percent being attained by the completed line.

Considerable planning was required in the delivery of HSL-Zuid; in excess of 100,000 documents were produced for the customer during the project implementation phase alone. RAMS management was practiced extensively, searching for potential problems, possible improvements, hidden risks, and unobserved costs and errors. The programme needed to adhere to various requirements; not only the specific stipulations of the contract, relevant legislation and standards were also applied, such as the Technical Specifications for Interoperability and EN 50126. Furthermore, defined safety objectives for the line were created for the Integral Safety Plan. Full compliance had to be comprehensively demonstrated and validated.

Amongst the more significant civil engineering works that were constructed for HSL-Zuid include a 6km-long viaduct outside Bleiswijk, a 2km-long bridge crossing the Hollandsch Diep waterway, and four tunnels of various lengths, the longest of which being just short of 8km. Due to the requirement for trains to traverse these tunnels at a maximum speed of 300km/h, it was necessary to develop and install specialised equipment that would be capable of operating under any foreseeable emergency situations that may arise during the line's operating life, including lighting, escape routes, fire detection and fire fighting systems, ventilation, drainage, flood protection measures, heating, and access elevators. Power for the line was provided via seven purpose-built autotransformer substations; the overhead contact system comprised, amongst other elements, 2,507 pylons, 4,038 brackets, 180km of negative feeders and 180km of return conductors.

Construction of HSL-Zuid proceeded at a rapid pace. During summer 2005, testing commenced on the southern section, between Rotterdam and the Belgian border, of the line; a similar period of testing started on the northern section in early 2006. Limited residual work, such as to address unstable subsoils and tunnel lining weaknesses, was carried out. On 28 July 2006, the southern section of HSL-Zuid was formally delivered by Infraspeed. On 21 December 2006, the consortium handed over the northern section of the line to the customer, officially ending the construction phase as per schedule.

Maintenance activities on HSL-Zuid performed by Infraspeed are structured and recorded along with general status data through an asset management system; this approach supports the generation and provision of appropriate documented information that, amongst other functions, is the basis of payment to the consortium of income for the work performed. Data is gathered from various sources, including intelligent trackside sensors. Infraspeed has alleged that conventional rolling stock is responsible for excessive wearing upon the infrastructure.

In 2011, Siemens announced that it had sold its stake in Infraspeed to HSBC and Innisfree, resulting in these two companies controlling ~86% of the shares.

== See also ==
- NS Hispeed, Fyra; operator and brand name used for the HSL-Zuid line
