= Royal BAM Group =

Dutch construction company

Royal BAM Group nv
- Native name: Koninklijke BAM Groep nv
- Formerly: N.V. Bataafsche Aanneming Maatschappij van Bouw- en Betonwerken v/h Firma J. van der Wal en Zoon (1928-1971)
- Type: Public (Naamloze vennootschap)
- Traded as: Euronext: BAMNB
- Industry: Construction
- Founded: 1869
- Headquarters: Bunnik, Netherlands
- Key people: Ruud Joosten (CEO), Henk Rottinghuis (Chairman of the Supervisory Board)
- Revenue: €7,315 million (2021)
- Operating income: €278.4 million (2021)
- Net income: €18.1 million (2021)
- Number of employees: 15,739 (FTE, average 2021)
- Website: www.bam.com

Royal BAM Group nv (Dutch: Koninklijke BAM Groep nv) is a Dutch construction-services business with headquarters in Bunnik, Netherlands. Based on revenue it is the largest construction company in the Netherlands.

== History ==
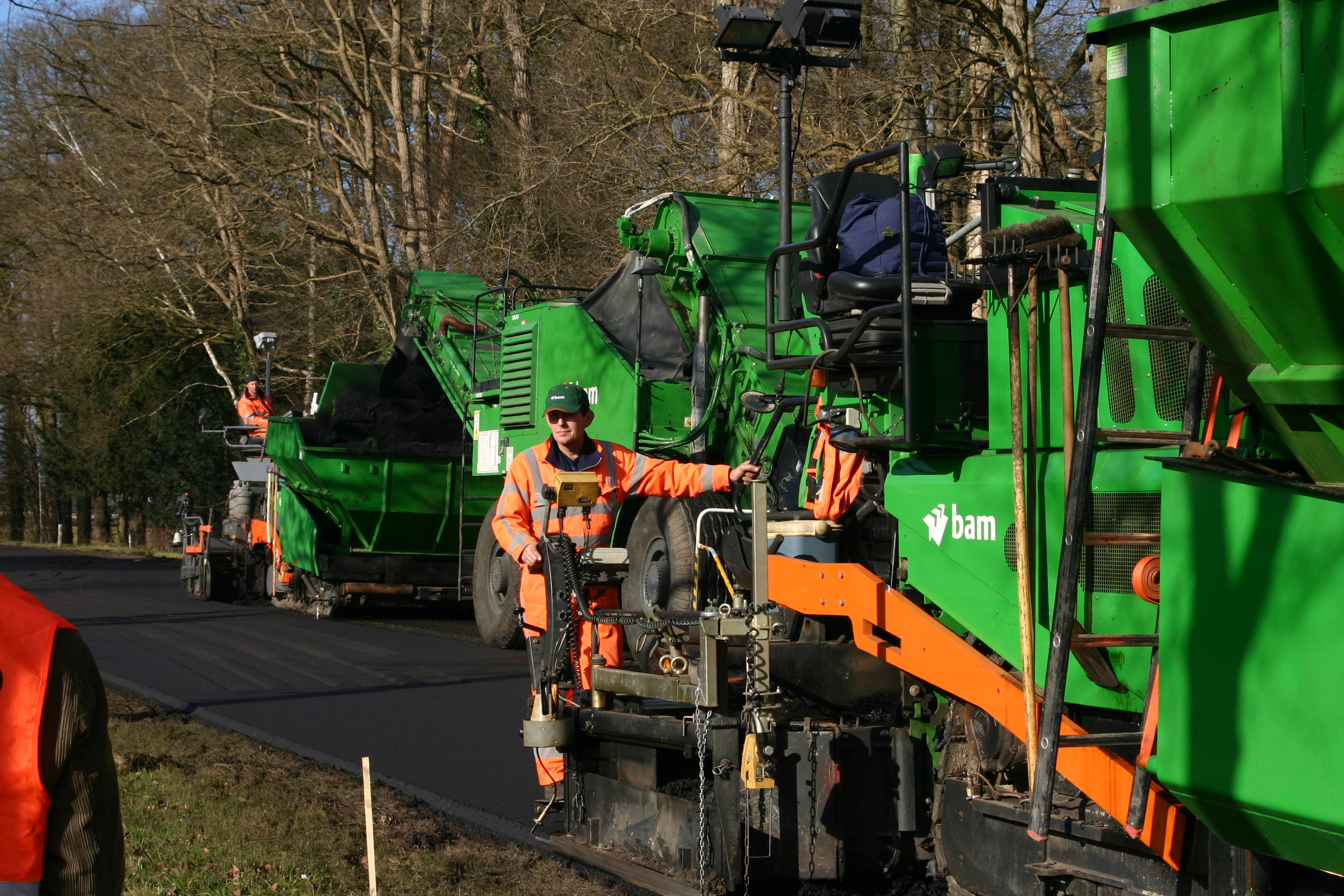
Road Construction by BAM Group

The company was founded by Adam van der Wal as a joiner's shop in 1869 in Groot-Ammers – a rural village in the Alblasserwaard region to the east of Rotterdam. At the end of the 19th century, Adam's son, Jan van der Wal, took over the business and worked as a construction contractor not only in the Alblasserwaard region but at further afield locations, including Vlaardingen and The Hague, where he soon opted to relocate to. Jan's son, Joop van der Wal, studied civil engineering in Delft prior to joining his father's company in 1926.

During 1927, the business was renamed Bataafsche Aanneming Maatschappij van Bouw- en Betonwerken, in English, Batavian Construction Company for Construction and Concrete Projects plc. ('BAM'); it transitioned from being a family-owned firm into a 'naamloze vennootschap' (public limited company).

The company was listed on the Amsterdam Stock Exchange in 1959. Starting in 1973, the company traded under the name BAM Holding N.V.

When the company reached its 125th anniversary on 12 May 1994, it received the right to add 'Royal' to its name. It continued to expand through acquisition, such as its purchase of rival companies Interbuild (in 1998), and Hollandsche Beton Groep ('HBG') (in 2002).

In November 2006 Royal BAM issued a profit warning, and launched an investigation into the incurring of £78m of losses at its German construction subsidiary. In July 2008, HBG was rebranded as Bam Construct UK. In mid-2010 the company's share price was impacted by a rights issue.

Several times during the 2010s Royal BAM produced poor fiscal results, attributed as the cause of job losses and a restructuring effort being launched in 2014. While performance had reportedly recovered in the UK by 2016, losses in both Germany and the Middle East were stated to have been incurred by the business towards the end of the decade.

In July 2020, Royal BAM announced that it was winding down its 600-strong BAM International business due to consequences of the COVID-19 pandemic. Up to 150 jobs were also to be cut at BAM Construct UK. In September 2021 Royal BAM announced the sale of its German interests, which cumulatively produced an annual turnover of €500 million, to the German real estate and construction company Zech Group and the Gustav Zech Foundation. Around this time, the management opted to concentrate on its core businesses in the UK, Ireland and the Netherlands.

In October 2022, Dutch authorities (the Fiscal Information and Investigation Service and the Public Prosecution Service) visited BAM International bv offices in Gouda, in an investigation relating to potential irregularities at some completed projects; Royal BAM was "fully cooperating" with the investigation. In July 2024, Royal BAM reported its UK construction business had suffered a £19.5m loss due to problems at Manchester's Co-op Live Arena, and would be cutting further jobs.

== Operations ==
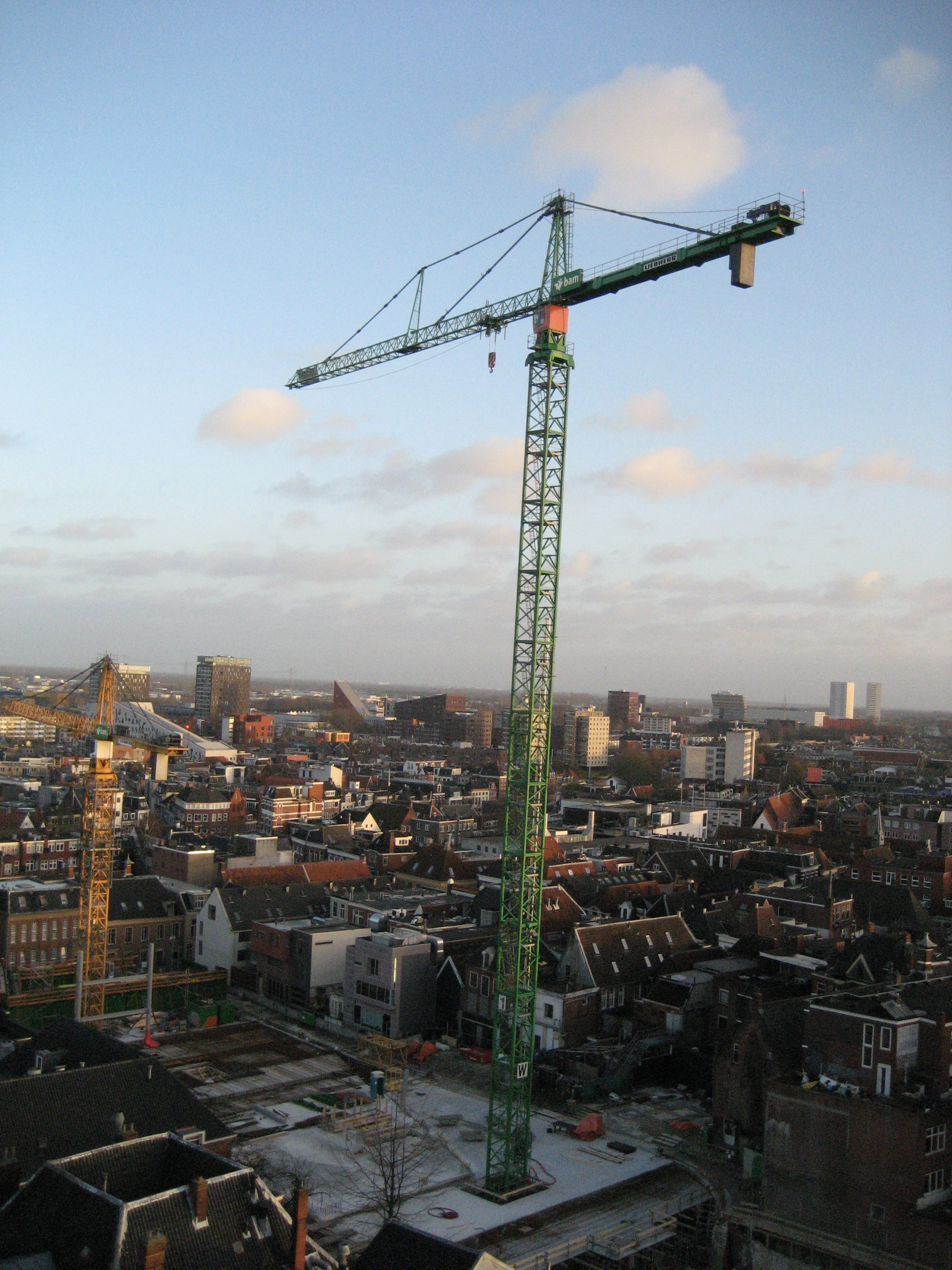
BAM towercrane in Groningen

The company's major operations include:

- BAM Bouw en Techniek – Non-residential construction
- BAM Wonen – Residential construction
- AM – Area development
- BAM Infra – Civil engineering in the Netherlands
- BAM Interbuild – Non-residential and residential (apartments) building in Brussels and Flanders
- BAM Construct UK (comprising BAM Construction and BAM Properties)
- BAM Nuttall – Civil engineering in the UK (comprising BAM Ritchies – geotechnical)
- BAM Contractors Ltd (BAM Ireland) - Building, civil engineering, facilities management, property and rail in Ireland (Formerly Ascon Contractors, Thomas Logan, Rohcon)
- BAM Deutschland – Construction in Germany
- Wayss & Freytag Ingenierbau – Civil engineering in Germany; as tunnelling specialist also active as joint venture partner in BAM's other home markets)
- BAM International – Projects outside of Europe
- BAM PPP – Investment company

== Major projects ==
Major projects completed by the company include:

- the Amsterdam Arena football stadium for AFC Ajax in Amsterdam completed in 1996
- the Antwerp Law Courts completed in 2005
- the Euroborg football stadium for FC Groningen in Groningen completed in 2006
- the HSL-Zuid high-speed railway line completed in 2009 (as part of the Infraspeed consortium)
- the Co-op Live Arena in Manchester completed in 2024

== National Children's Hospital Ireland ==
The company is also responsible for the National Children's Hospital Ireland in Dublin which is facing significant time and cost overruns. BAM had missed the 18th deadline in a row to hand over the project, causing many to question why BAM are given any other contracts in Ireland at all. Pádraig Rice TD described BAM is holding the government by ransom. The project was over budget by over €1.4 billion. It is currently the sixth most expensive hospital in the world.
