= Schiphol–Antwerp high-speed railway =

Railway line in Belgium and the Netherlands

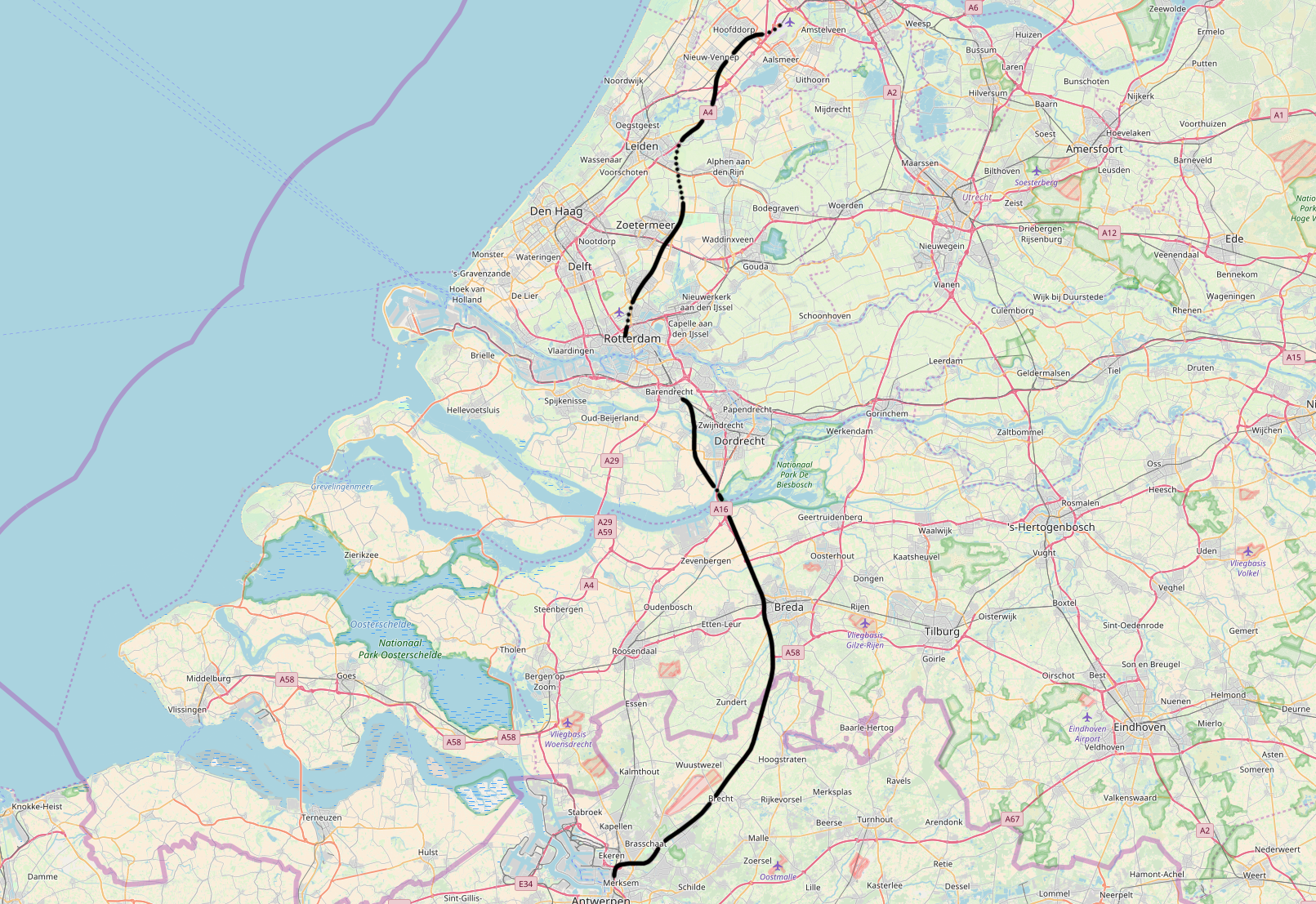
Map of the Schiphol–Antwerp high-speed line

The Schiphol–Antwerp high-speed railway is a high-speed rail line, connecting Schiphol Airport railway station, 9 kilometres southwest of the centre of Amsterdam, Netherlands, to Antwerp, Belgium. It has a total length of 147 kilometres (91 miles), crossing the Dutch/Belgian border at Hazeldonk/Meer.

It comprises the following parts:

- HSL-Zuid, the northern part, in the Netherlands
- HSL 4, the southern part, in Belgium
