= NS Intercity Nieuwe Generatie =

Class of electric multiple units for Nederlandse Spoorwegen

NS Class 3100/3200/3300
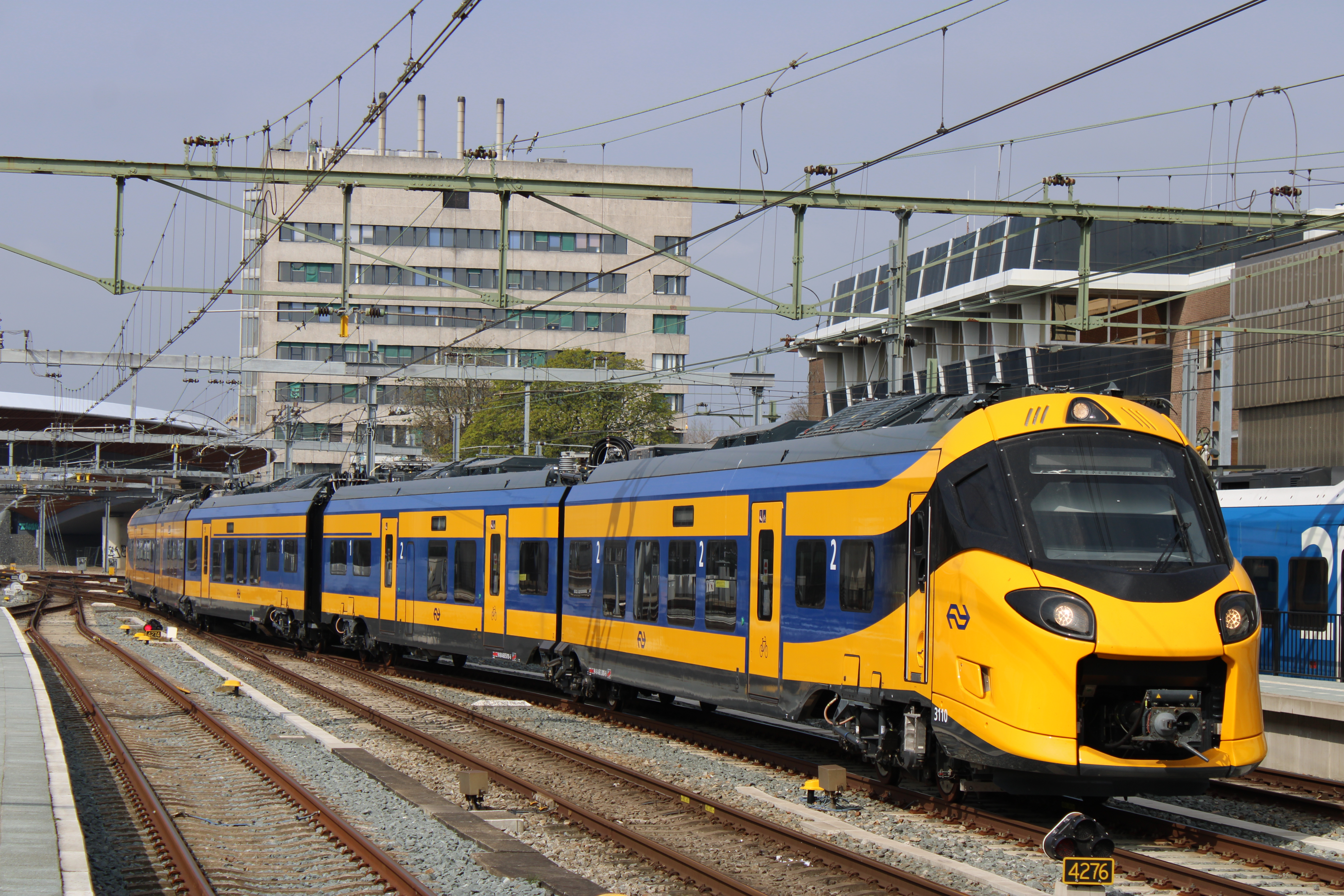
- ICNG 3110 at Zwolle station

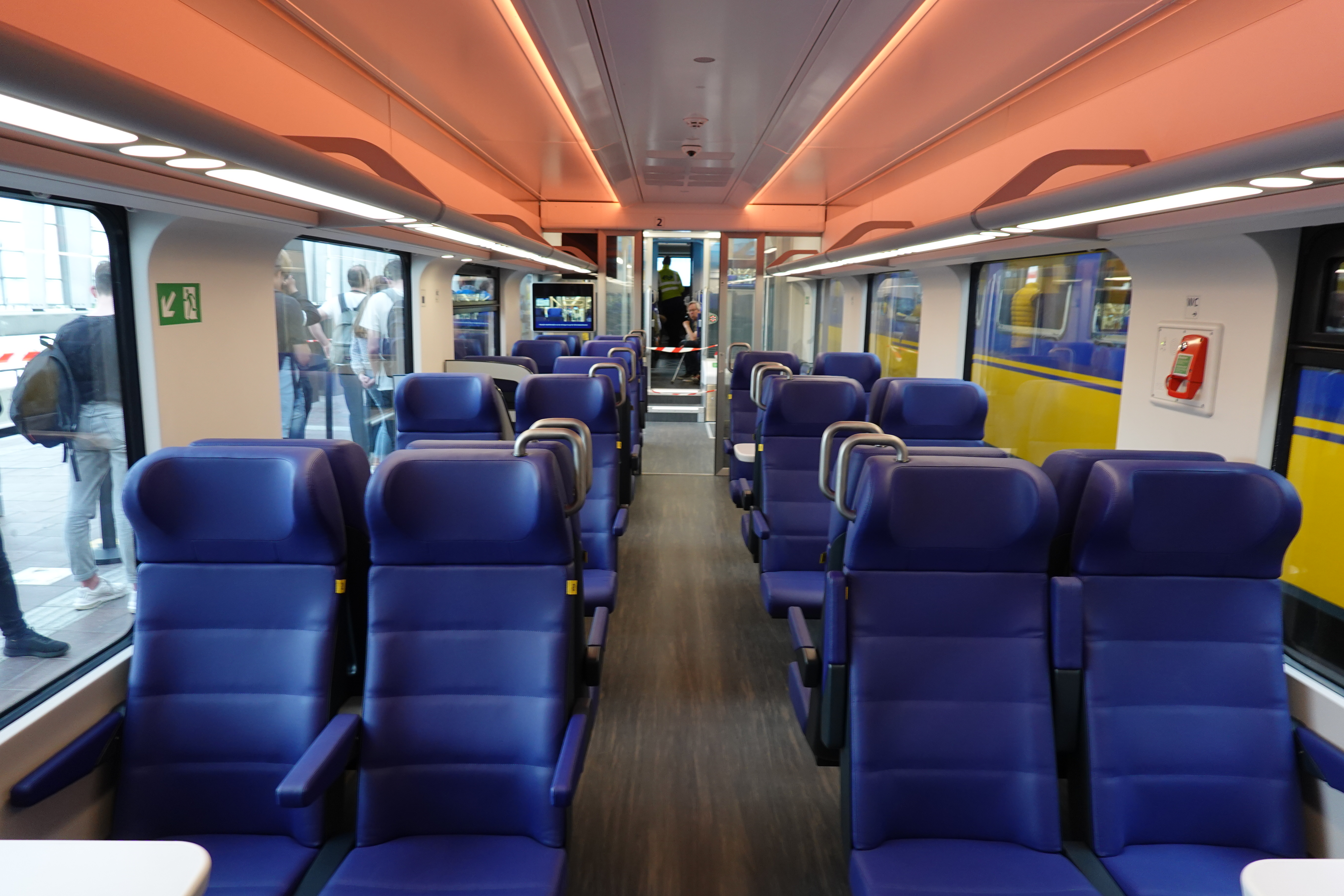
- Second class interior
- Stock type: Electric multiple unit
- In service: 2023–present
- Manufacturer: Alstom Konstal
- Built at: Chorzów, Poland
- Family name: Coradia Stream
- Entered service: 19 April 2023
- Number built: 99 (79 + 20 ordered with options for 150 more)
- Formation: 5-car sets (3100); 8-car sets (3200/3300)
- Operator: NS Reizigers

Specifications
- Train length: 5 car: 110 m (360 ft) 8 car: 164.9 m (541 ft)
- Floor height: 810 mm (32 in)
- Maximum speed: HSL-Zuid: 200 km/h (125 mph); Regular Lines: 140 km/h (87 mph)
- Weight: 5-car units: 198.7 t (195.6 long tons; 219.0 short tons) 8-car units: 285.7 t (281.2 long tons; 314.9 short tons)
- Power output: 3100: 2,545 kW (3,413 hp); 3200/3300: 3,390 kW (4,546 hp)
- Electric systems: 1,500 V DC; 25 kV 50 Hz AC; 3,000 V DC (3300 only); 15 kV 16 2/3 Hz AC (3300 only)
- Current collection: Pantograph
- UIC classification: 3100: Bo′(2)′(2)′Bo′+2′(2)′Bo′; 3200/3300: Bo′(2)′(2)′(2)′Bo′+Bo′(2)′(2)′(2)′Bo′
- Safety systems: ATB-EG, ERTMS/ETCS, TBL 1+, PZB
- Track gauge: 1,435 mm (4 ft 8 1/2 in) standard gauge

The Intercity Nieuwe Generatie (English: Intercity New Generation), or ICNG, nicknamed "Wesp" (Wasp) is an electric multiple unit trainset of the Dutch Railways. In addition to supplementing the existing intercity rolling stock, it will replace the Bombardier TRAXX locomotives and Intercityrijtuig coaches on the high-speed line between Amsterdam and Belgium. This will provide the connection that was originally planned to be provided by the Fyra service, which was cancelled in 2013.

The process to acquire the trains began in 2014, eventually resulting in trains built by Alstom Konstal in Poland based on their Coradia Stream platform. The trains arrived in the Netherlands starting in 2020, and after a period of testing, entered passenger service in April 2023.

== History ==
The NS began procurement of a new intercity trainset in July 2014. At that time, it aimed to receive the trains in 2021 and to start deployment in 2022. The respondents were Alstom, Siemens, Bombardier and Stadler. In May 2016 NS announced that Alstom had won a contract for around 80 trainsets. At the end of May, the contract was finalized to include a total of 79 trainsets, including 49 5-car units and 30 8-car units.

Since the cancellation of the Fyra service, NS had been operating the Intercity Direct service using TRAXX locomotives and existing Intercityrijtuig coaches dating back to the 1980s. To replace these, the order with Alstom was expanded with trains capable of running on both Belgian and Dutch track. In 2017, the order was expanded with two 8-car trains, which was later expanded to a total of 20 trains.

The first train arrived in the Netherlands on 23 May 2020 to begin testing on the Dutch railway network. Permission to operate on the Dutch network was granted at the end of 2022.

In April 2023, the NS began phasing the ICNG into operation. The train is initially running on the high-speed line between Schiphol and Breda at 200 km/h (125 mph), a significant improvement over the existing equipment, which can only operate up to 160 km/h (100 mph). NS plans to introduce the ICNG between The Hague - Eindhoven, Amsterdam - Groningen, Amsterdam - Leeuwarden and Amsterdam - Enschede.

== Incidents ==
- On 16 October 2020, two ICNG units were being towed when the train derailed at Dreileben, Germany. The driver of the locomotive hauling the train was injured. The two units were being towed by a diesel locomotive from the Alstom factory at Salzgitter routed via Magdeburg for 25 kV AC railway electrification testing at Blankenburg (Harz) station on the Rübeland Railway. During 18 October 2020 rail cranes were used to place the derailed unit 3105 back on the rails, with 3109 having survived without derailment. The diesel locomotive 214 006 remained in the field.

== Description ==
The train type is divided into three classes: 3100, 3200 and 3300. The classes differ by their length and electric systems, with part of the 3300 class trains able to operate on the NMBS/SNCB Belgian railway network and part on the DB German railway network.

| Class | Fleet numbers | Number ordered | Length | Electric Systems | Train protection system(s) |
|---|---|---|---|---|---|
| 3100 | 3101-3149 | 49 | 5 coaches | 1,500 V DC; 25 kV 50 Hz AC | ATB-EG, ERTMS |
| 3200 | 3201-3227 | 27 | 8 coaches | 1,500 V DC; 25 kV 50 Hz AC | ATB-EG, ERTMS |
| 3300 | 3301-3321 (ICNGB) | 21 | 8 coaches | 1,500 V DC; 3,000 V DC; 25 kV 50 Hz AC | ATB-EG, ERTMS, TBL 1+ |
| 3300 | 3351-3362 (ICNGD) | 12 | 8 coaches | 1,500 V DC; 15 kV 16 2/3 Hz AC; 25 kV 50 Hz AC | ATB-EG, ERTMS, PZB |

=== 3300 series for Belgium ===
The 3300 series ICNGB train has eight carriages, containing a total of 410 seats. This version has an extra toilet and more luggage space. It is able to use the Belgian rail protection system and 3kV overhead lines.

NS placed an additional order early on for two Coradia suitable for the Belgian rail network (ICNGB), because the train stock in use for the Amsterdam – Brussels connection is due for replacement in 2025. With that order, the intention was to test these two trainsets and to obtain approval for the Belgian rail network, after which a follow-up order could be placed. This covered the risk that the admission would expire. However, the first follow-up order for eighteen trains has already been placed, well before the first trains have entered service, so that from 2025, 20 units will be available for service to Belgium.

=== 3300 series for Germany ===
The 3300 series ICNG-D train has eight carriages, containing a total of 410 seats. This version has an extra toilet and more luggage space. It is able to use the German rail protection system and 15kV, AC 16.7 Hz overhead lines. It is expected that in 2028, this train will be in service between Amsterdam and the German Ruhr area as an open-access service. Because of this, passengers will not be able to use this service for domestic journeys.

== Interior ==
The trains are equipped with a universal (wheelchair accessible) toilet and a special wheelchair space for two wheelchairs. The five-car train set has a second toilet, the eight-car train set two additional standard toilets. The trains are also equipped with first and second class sections, which are divided into sections for "work", "silence" and "meet & greet". Extra luggage racks have been installed on the 33xx version for their international journeys to Belgium and Germany. There are sockets and USB connections for charging a telephone or laptop in both the first and second class carriages. The usual NS onboard information screens and free WiFi are also available on the trains.
