= HSL-Zuid =

Dutch high-speed railway

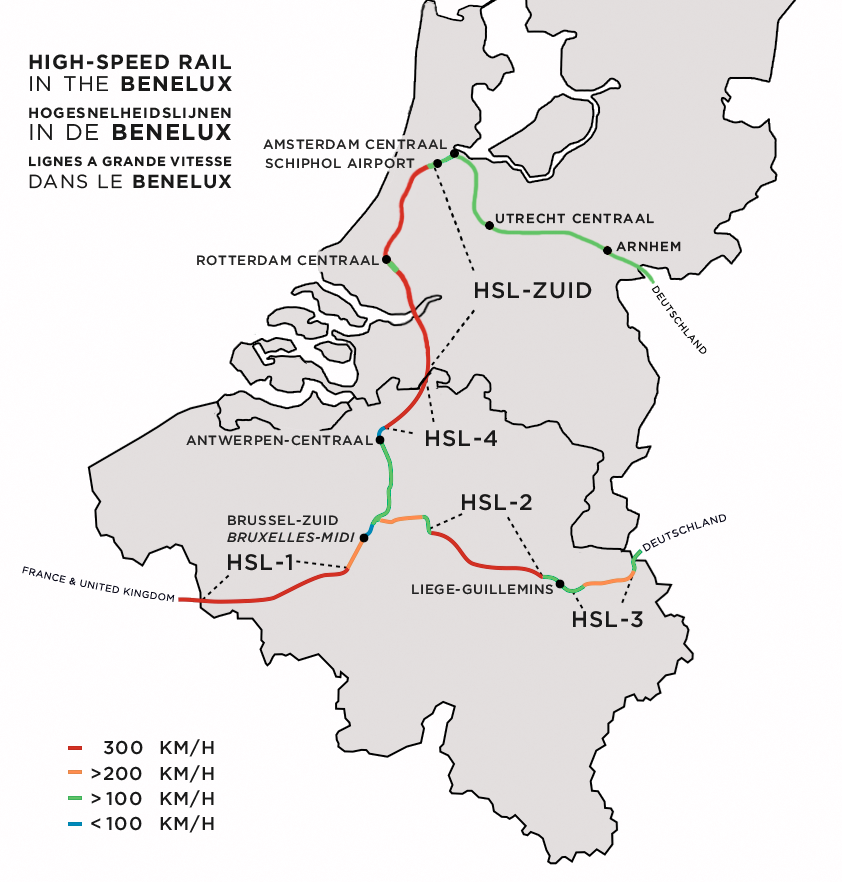
- Route of the HSL-Zuid

Overview
- Owner: ProRail
- Locale: North Holland, South Holland and North Brabant, Netherlands

Service
- Operator: Infraspeed

History
- Opened: 7 September 2009

Technical
- Line length: 125 km (78 mi)
- Track gauge: 1,435 mm (4 ft 8 1/2 in) standard gauge
- Electrification: Overhead line, 25 kV 50 Hz AC
- Operating speed: 300 km/h (186 mph)
- Signalling: ETCS Level 2

The HSL-Zuid (Dutch: Hogesnelheidslijn Zuid, lit. 'South High-Speed Line') is a 125-kilometre (78 mi) high-speed railway in the Netherlands running from the Amsterdam metropolitan area to the Belgian border, with connections to conventional railways to Breda and The Hague. Together with Belgium's HSL 4, it forms the Schiphol–Antwerp high-speed railway. The line allows speeds of up to 300 kilometres per hour (190 mph) and is used by both domestic and international services.

Initially planned to open in 2007, the HSL-Zuid entered public service on 7 September 2009. It is utilized by Intercity Direct and Eurostar trains, providing fast connections between cities such as Amsterdam, Rotterdam, Brussels, Paris, and London. Although designed for high-speed travel, short sections near Rotterdam and Antwerp require trains to reduce speed due to conventional infrastructure. The line uses the 25 kV 50 Hz AC electrification systems common to most northern European corridors along with European Train Control System signaling.

The line was designed, financed and built by the Infraspeed consortium, which also remains responsible for its maintenance until 2031, as part of the largest public–private partnership (PPP) contract ever awarded by the Dutch government.

== Route ==
Route between Paris and Amsterdam before (red) and after (blue) the introduction of high-speed rail technology in Europe

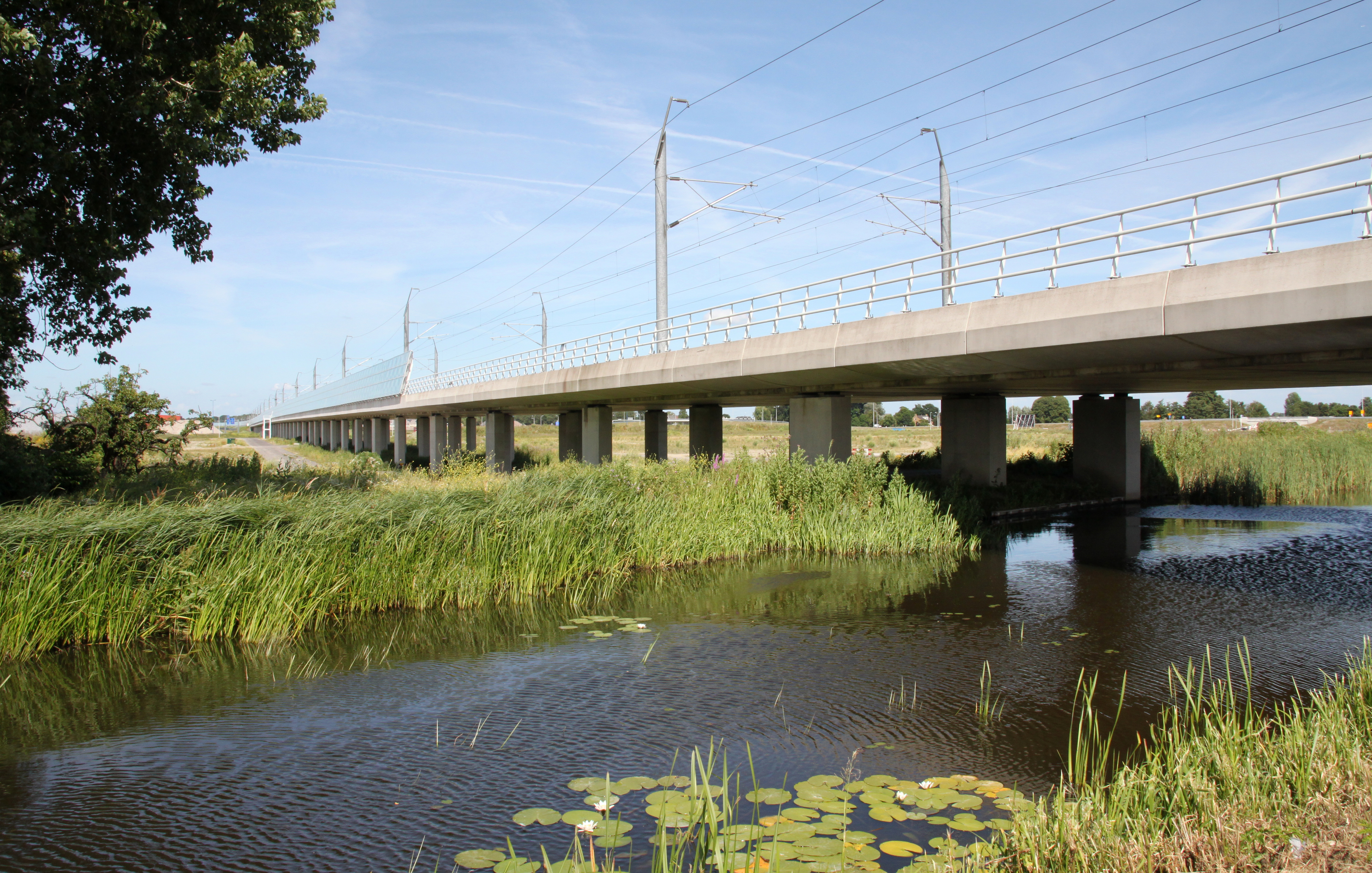
HSL-Zuid near Zoetermeer

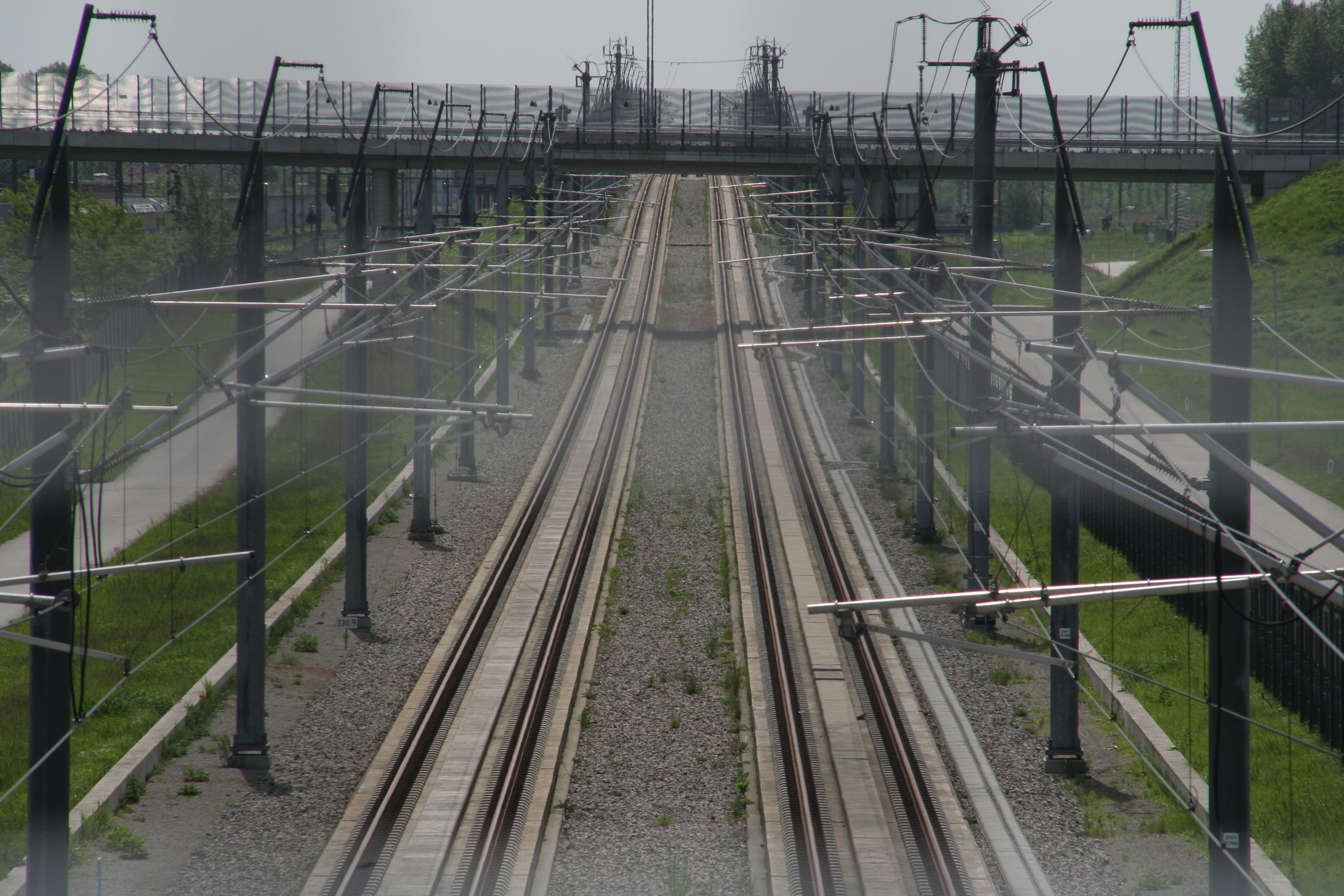
Tracks near Lage Zwaluwe

Between Amsterdam and Schiphol (Westtak Ringspoorbaan), and around Rotterdam, high speed trains operate on the existing line.

South of Schiphol the dedicated high speed tracks begin, parallelling the existing railway line until Nieuw-Vennep. The line then branches off eastwards, continuing along the west side of Roelofarendsveen and Hoogmade and entering a tunnel east of Leiderdorp. This tunnel was built to protect the character of the Groene Hart region. North of Zoetermeer the train line leaves the tunnel west of Hazerswoude; it subsequently passes to the east of Benthuizen, and on an elevated track east of Zoetermeer, then back on the surface between Berkel en Rodenrijs and Bergschenhoek, and after a tunnel, joins the existing line again north of Rotterdam.

Trains run briefly on existing tracks for a few kilometres before entering the high speed line again. At Barendrecht the two tracks cross each other and the trains begin left-hand running as in Belgium, France and the United Kingdom. From here the line runs next to the existing railway as well as the Betuweroute, continuing through the Hoekse Waard area, bypassing Dordrecht. South of Dordrecht, the line runs next to the A16 motorway with a branch spurring off to the city of Breda. South of Breda, the line again follows the motorway towards Antwerp in northern Belgium. At the Belgian border, it connects to HSL 4, which carries on to Antwerp, with an existing line from Antwerp to Brussels.

== Services ==
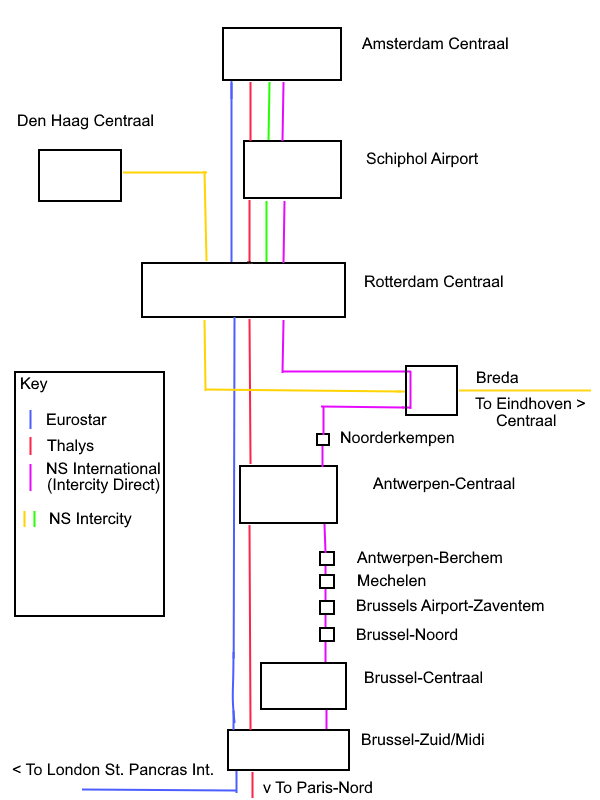
HSL-Zuid services

Since the opening of the HSL-Zuid, the number of trains has been expanded over time.

=== Domestic trains ===
On 7 September 2009, operator NS International started a domestic train service between Amsterdam and Rotterdam, weekdays only, 1 train hourly with TRAXX-locomotives and ICR-carriages running at 160 km/h maximum. Over time, this service has been expanded. On 12 April 2010, service was expanded to Saturday and Sunday. On 4 October 2010, the frequency was doubled to 2 trains hourly. On 3 April 2011, this service was extended to Breda. This service is called Intercity Direct, until 2013 Fyra. Although a more intensive service was planned initially, this is not possible due to the V250 rolling stock problem.

Class	Illustration	Type	Top speed		Number	Routes operated	Built	Remarks
Class	Illustration	Type	km/h	mph	Number	Routes operated	Built	Remarks
NS Class 186		Locomotive	160	100	35	Amsterdam–Schiphol–Rotterdam–Breda Amsterdam–Schiphol–Rotterdam The Hague – Rotterdam – Breda – Eindhoven	2008–2009, 2014–2015	No longer in service
NS ICRm (Prio)		Carriage	160	100	60	Amsterdam–Schiphol–Rotterdam–Breda Amsterdam–Schiphol–Rotterdam The Hague – Rotterdam – Breda – Eindhoven	1980–1988	No longer in service
NS ICNG		EMU	200	124	79	Amsterdam–Schiphol–Rotterdam The Hague – Rotterdam – Breda – Eindhoven	2018–	
V250		EMU	250	155	19	Amsterdam–Schiphol–Rotterdam	2008–2012	No longer in service

=== International trains ===
==== Benelux train ====
The "Benelux train", in the Netherlands also known as Intercity Brussel, which existed before the Fyra, has been put into service again since the latter's demise, albeit under a renewed livery. It is a conventional InterCity train running between Amsterdam and Brussels-South using the Schiphol–Antwerp high-speed railway with reverse in Breda. These trains run every hour in both directions between Rotterdam and Brussels, serving Schiphol and Amsterdam CS north of Rotterdam.

Benelux train services to The Hague have been cancelled starting January 2022. These trains are redirected to Amsterdam over the HSL-Zuid, increasing the Amsterdam–Breda–Brussels service to sixteen trains per day in each direction instead of twelve but obliging travellers between Brussels and The Hague to change trains in Rotterdam or in Breda, albeit with a couple of minutes' reduction in total travel time.

The current rolling stock is scheduled to be replaced by the NS ICNG-B stock starting 2025.

Class	Illustration	Type	Top speed		Number	Routes operated	Built	Remarks
Class	Illustration	Type	mph	km/h	Number	Routes operated	Built	Remarks
SNCB Class 28 or NS Class 186		Locomotive	100	160		Amsterdam CS – Bruxelles-Midi		
NS ICRm (Prio)		Carriage	100	160		Amsterdam CS – Bruxelles-Midi		
NS ICNG-B		EMU	124	200	20	Amsterdam CS – Bruxelles-Midi	2018–	

Stations served:

- Amsterdam Central
- Schiphol Airport
- Rotterdam Central
- Breda
- Noorderkempen (Brecht)
- Antwerpen-Central
- Antwerpen-Berchem
- Mechelen
- Brussels-Airport/Zaventem
- Brussels-North
- Brussels-Central
- Brussels-South

==== Eurostar ====
Eurostar runs 16 times a day on the HSL-Zuid with speeds up to 300 km/h. Since late 2020 the Eurostar service to London is operated without change in Brussels due to a treaty with the British government, before the treaty passengers to the UK needed to disembark in Brussels and undergo customs screenings.:

- 11 trains per day: Amsterdam Centraal – Schiphol – Rotterdam Centraal – Antwerp – Brussels Midi – Paris Nord
- 4 trains per day: Amsterdam Centraal – Rotterdam Centraal – Brussels Midi – Lille Europe – London St Pancras International
- 1 train per day: Amsterdam Centraal – Schiphol – Rotterdam Centraal – Antwerp – Brussels Midi – Paris CDG Airport – Marne-la-Vallée Disneyland
- Winter seasonal service: 1 train per week Amsterdam Centraal – Schiphol – Rotterdam Centraal – Antwerp – Brussels Midi – Chambéry – Bourg-Saint-Maurice
- Summer seasonal service: 1 train per week Amsterdam Centraal – Schiphol – Rotterdam Centraal – Antwerp – Brussels Midi – Valence TGV – Marseilles St. Charles

Class	Illustration	Type	Top speed		Number	Routes operated	Built
Class	Illustration	Type	mph	km/h	Number	Routes operated	Built
Thalys PBA		EMU	186	300	9	Amsterdam – Schiphol – Rotterdam – Antwerp – Brussels-South – Paris Nord Amsterdam – Schiphol – Rotterdam – Antwerp – Brussels-South – Lille Europe	1996
Thalys PBKA		EMU	186	300	17	Amsterdam – Schiphol – Rotterdam – Antwerp – Brussels-South – Paris Nord Amsterdam – Schiphol – Rotterdam – Antwerp – Brussels-South – Lille Europe	1997
Eurostar e320		EMU	200	320	17	Amsterdam – Rotterdam – Brussels-South – Lille Europe (limited service) – London St. Pancras Int'l	2011–2018

==== Fyra ====
Fyra International was an international high speed train service operated with V250 rolling stock between Amsterdam Centraal – Schiphol Airport – Rotterdam Centraal – Antwerp – Brussels, 10 times daily. Due to intensive problems with V250, this service only ran for forty days, between 8 December 2012 and 17 January 2013. The trains were eventually returned to Ansaldobreda.

Class	Illustration	Type	Top speed		Number	Routes operated	Built	Remarks
Class	Illustration	Type	mph	km/h	Number	Routes operated	Built	Remarks
V250		EMU	155	250	19	Amsterdam – Schiphol – Rotterdam – Antwerp – Brussels-Central – Brussels-South	2008–2012	No longer in service

== Travel times ==
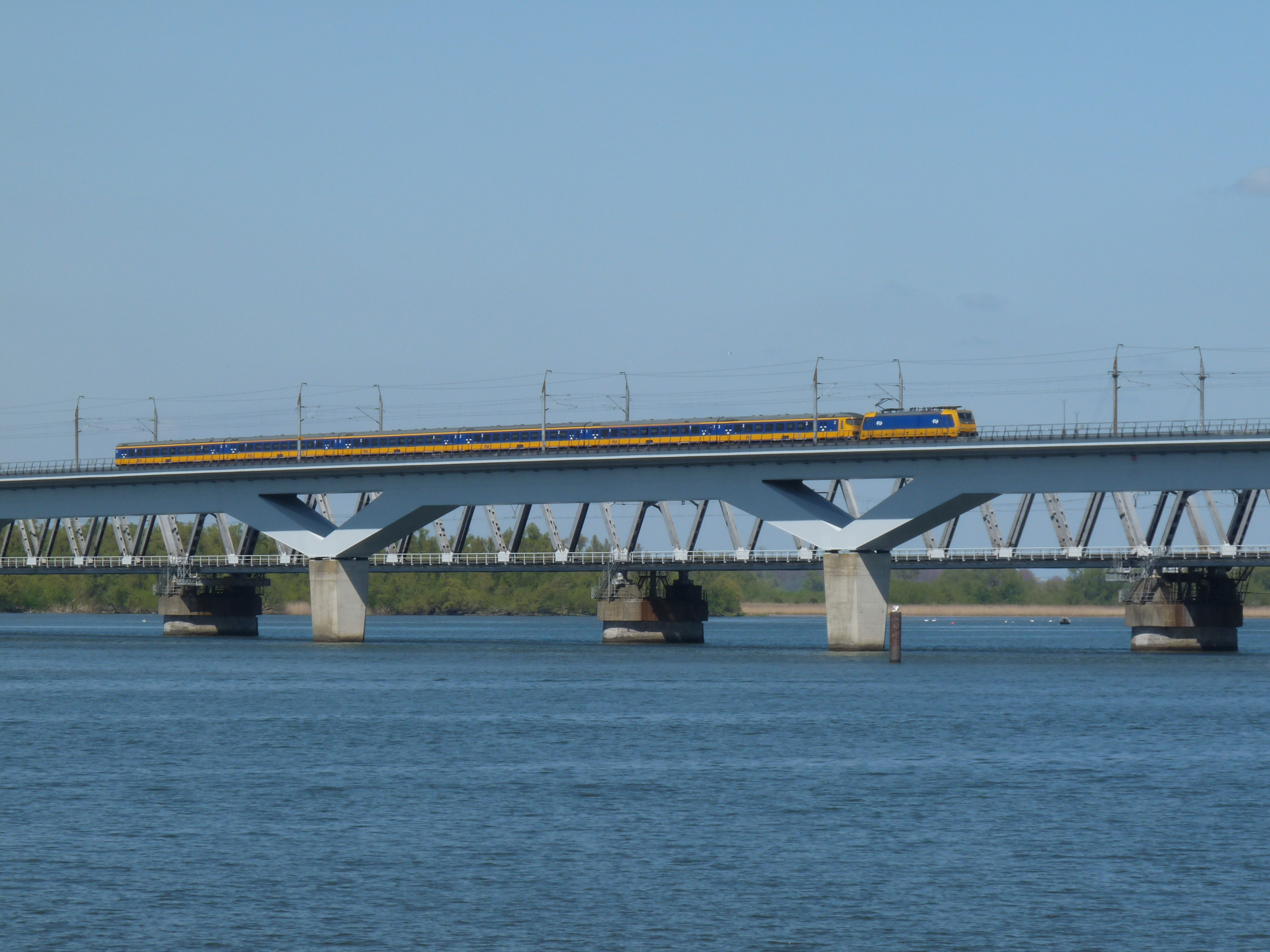
Intercity Direct domestic service crossing the Moerdijk bridges

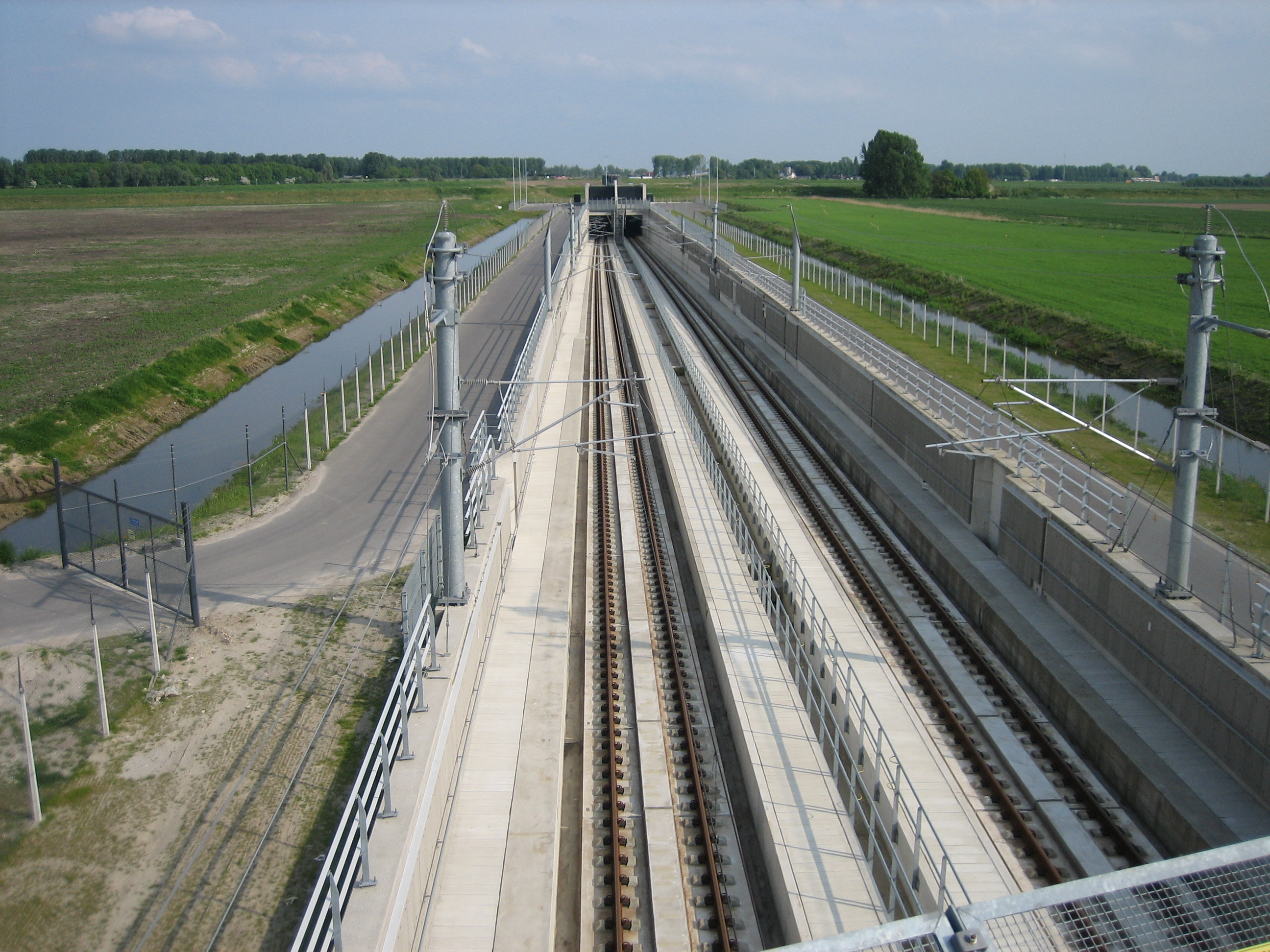
Rail tunnel under the Dordtsche Kil

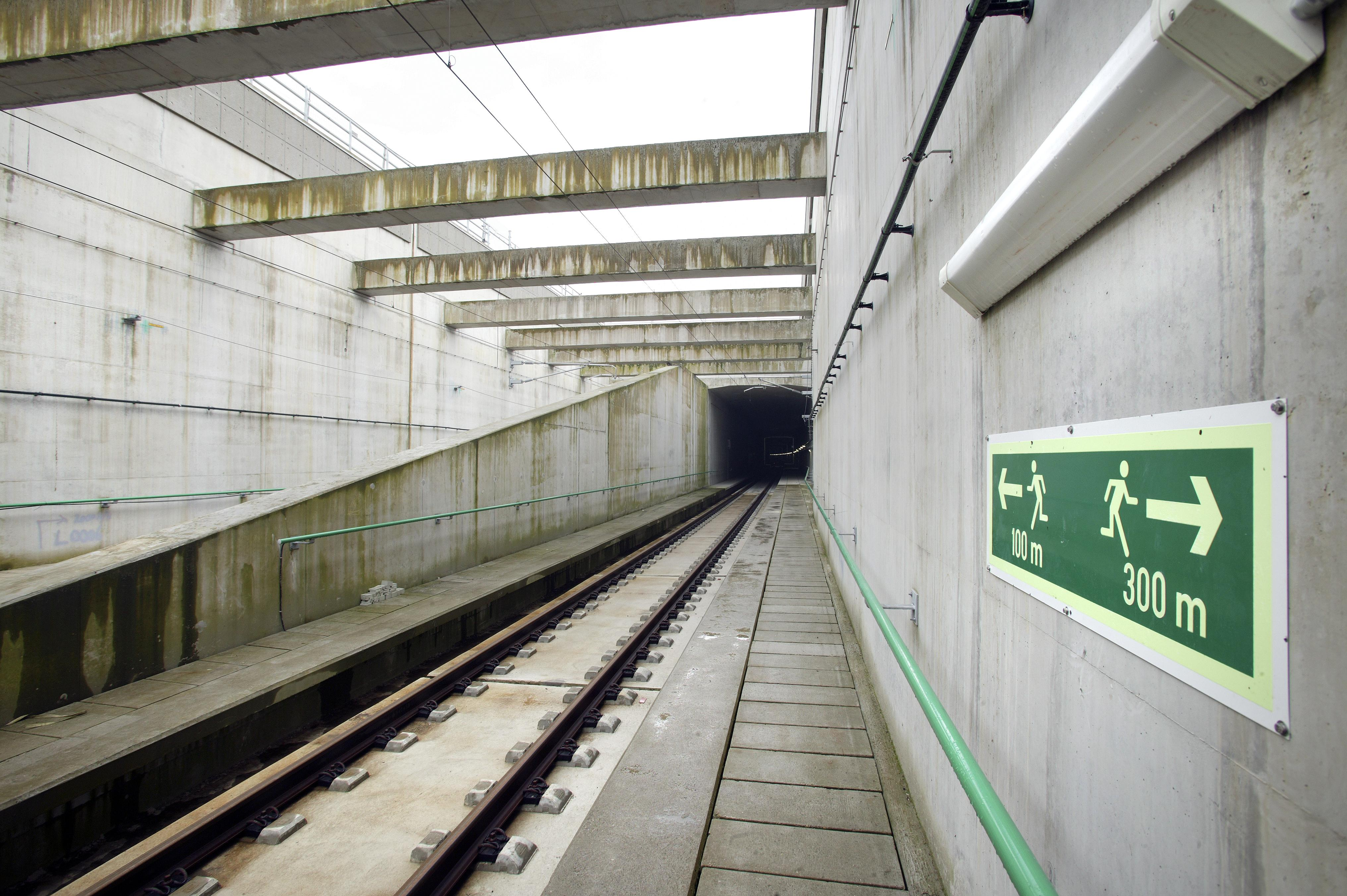
HSL tunnel near Rotterdam

The new line shortened travel times for international and domestic services departing from Amsterdam.

- From Amsterdam to Rotterdam (70 km or 44 mi): 43 minutes (previously 58 minutes)
- From Amsterdam to Breda (113 km or 70 mi): 59 minutes (previously 1 hour and 44 minutes)
- From Amsterdam to Antwerp (164.5 km or 102 mi): 1 hour and 10 minutes (previously 2 hours)
- From Amsterdam to Brussels (212 km or 132 mi): 1 hour and 44 minutes (previously 2 hours and 40 minutes)
- From Amsterdam to Paris (531 km or 330 mi): 3 hours and 13 minutes (previously 4 hours and 11 minutes)

From Roosendaal, however, the travel times have become longer.

- From Roosendaal to Brussels (82 km or 50 mi): 1 hour and 16 minutes not including the change of trains in Breda (previously 1 hour and 8 minutes)

Thalys reported that its trains would start using the line from December 2009, with Paris to Amsterdam journeys being 3 hours and 45 minutes and Brussels to Amsterdam journeys being 2 hours and 23 minutes, on account of a plan to gradually increase the line speed, with the same trains in June taking 3 hours and 18 minutes and 1 hour and 58 minutes. Nowadays trains travel from Paris and Brussels to Amsterdam in respectively 3 hours and 13 minutes and 1 hour and 44 minutes.

== Fares and tickets ==
On the domestic Intercity Direct services (running from Amsterdam to Schiphol, Rotterdam and Breda) all regular Nederlandse Spoorwegen (NS) tickets are valid. A supplement (Dutch: toeslag) is required only for domestic travel including the section between Schiphol and Rotterdam. This costs €3.20 one-way in rush hour, and €1.92 outside rush hour. Domestic tickets cannot be used on the international Thalys trains where reservations are mandatory.

== Technical problems ==
=== ETCS ===
Initially the HSL-Zuid route supported speeds of up to 160 km/h on both the southern Rotterdam to Breda and the northern Rotterdam to Schiphol section of the line. This was because ETCS Level 2 had not commenced operations and Level 1 was still in use. Various reliability issues prevented the use of Level 2 for sustainable commercial service. Another issue was that the updated ETCS software of the Bombardier TRAXX locomotives was not certified for ETCS Level 2 operation. Railway Gazette reported in April 2011 that certification had been achieved and indeed Level 2 operations began on the southern section in May 2011 with Fyra services running at up to 160 km/h and Thalys at up to 300 km/h. Level 2 went into operation on the northern part of the line in September 2011 and Thalys trains were then able to commence 300 km/h operations on that section. The V250 Fyra trains were hoped to enter service in December 2011 and indeed trial service (without passengers) began using first one, then two trains. As of March 2012 driver and train crew instruction runs were taking place with scheduled, non-passenger-carrying V250 interleaved between the passenger services and it was expected that these units would begin passenger operation in April 2012. The ETCS systems of wayside (Thales) and onboard (Traxx: Bombardier; Thalys & V250: Ansaldo STS) are interworking satisfactorily. With changes in the NS concession arrangements from 2015, the HSL service was combined with the national concession. The amount of Traxx locomotives and Prio carriages will be increased over the coming years as a stopgap measure until new intercity trains (foreseen in 2021/2022) will enter service. As a first step NS announced in December 2013 that they had placed an order at Bombardier for 19 Traxx locomotives.

=== V250 ===
The V250 trains were ordered at the Italian train manufacturer AnsaldoBreda and were delivered in mid-2009. On 31 May 2013, the Belgian railway company NMBS/SNCB decided to stop the Fyra project and refused delivery of the trains it had ordered. On 3 June 2013, the Dutch national railway company NS announced that it had made a similar evaluation, and expressed its desire to stop with the V250 project. The Dutch department of finance agreed, and recommended that NS do "everything in its power" to get a refund from AnsaldoBreda. At a press conference on 6 June 2013, the manufacturer claimed that the trains had been handled poorly by running the trains too fast (at maximum commercial speed of 250 km/h) under snow conditions. AnsaldoBreda has also threatened to sue the railways for the damage to its reputation.

On 17 March 2014 NS announced a settlement with AnsaldoBreda had been reached. The 9 NS trains will be returned to AnsaldoBreda for a refund of 125 million euros, 88 million euros less than originally paid. NS will receive an additional compensation for each resold unit to a maximum of 21 million euros. In May 2014, NMBS/SNCB, AnsaldoBreda and its controlling company Finmeccanica announced that they reached a settlement that confirms the cancellation of the train orders and includes the payment of 2.5 million euros to NMBS/SNCB.

=== Discovery of cracks and speed restrictions ===
Cracks were discovered in the welds on the Zuidweg viaduct near Rijpwetering in October 2022, believed to be caused by design error with the deformation of the rubber support blocks. There was approximately 80 cm of horizontal displacement of the track on the viaduct at that point, which had been monitored since construction in 2009. There were questions raised if the piling of the viaduct could withstand the force exerted by running trains at high speed. 9 other viaducts were investigated, all also between the northern portal of the 8.67 km Groenehart tunnel and the junction where it joins the conventional network at Hoofddorp, due to being constructed in a similar manner, and a 160 km/h restriction was placed across these. The structures were designed and built by Rijkswaterstaat, the civil engineering department of the Ministry of Infrastructure and Water Management.

In January 2024, 9 structures including bridges and viaducts were deemed not strong enough to withstand trains passing at high speed, meaning the restriction was further lowered from 160 km/h to 120 km/h.

Investigations by ProRail, the infrastructure manager, reduced the speed restriction further to 80 km/h on 5 of the 10 viaducts in July 2024, as it was deemed the viaducts were too light and therefore unstable with trains passing at high speed. Horizontal movement continues to be monitored on the structures and the 10 structures will likely need to be replaced, with ProRail suggesting work would be completed by 2026 at the earliest. Delays will increase by a further 2–3 minutes, for a total of up to 10 minutes on the northern part of HSL-Zuid. On 15 December 2024, the speed restriction was reverted on the viaducts, from 80 km/h back to 120 km/h.

In February 2025, the CEO of ProRail, John Voppen, reported that repairs will take a number of years to complete, with issues unique to each viaduct. Work on the Zuidweg viaduct near Rijpwetering will start later this year. Voppen ruled out vibrating sheet piles to stabilise the structure, due to concerns of further damage. Screwing piles will also need heavy machinery that will be difficult to reach the sites by road, adding to the delays.

The problems have necessitated timetable changes, and the line is now running 3 trains per hour instead of 5. International trains continue to run, though taking longer.

== See also ==
- High-speed rail in Belgium
- High-speed rail in the Netherlands
- High-speed rail in Europe
