= AnsaldoBreda V250 =

High-speed train

V250 / ETR.700
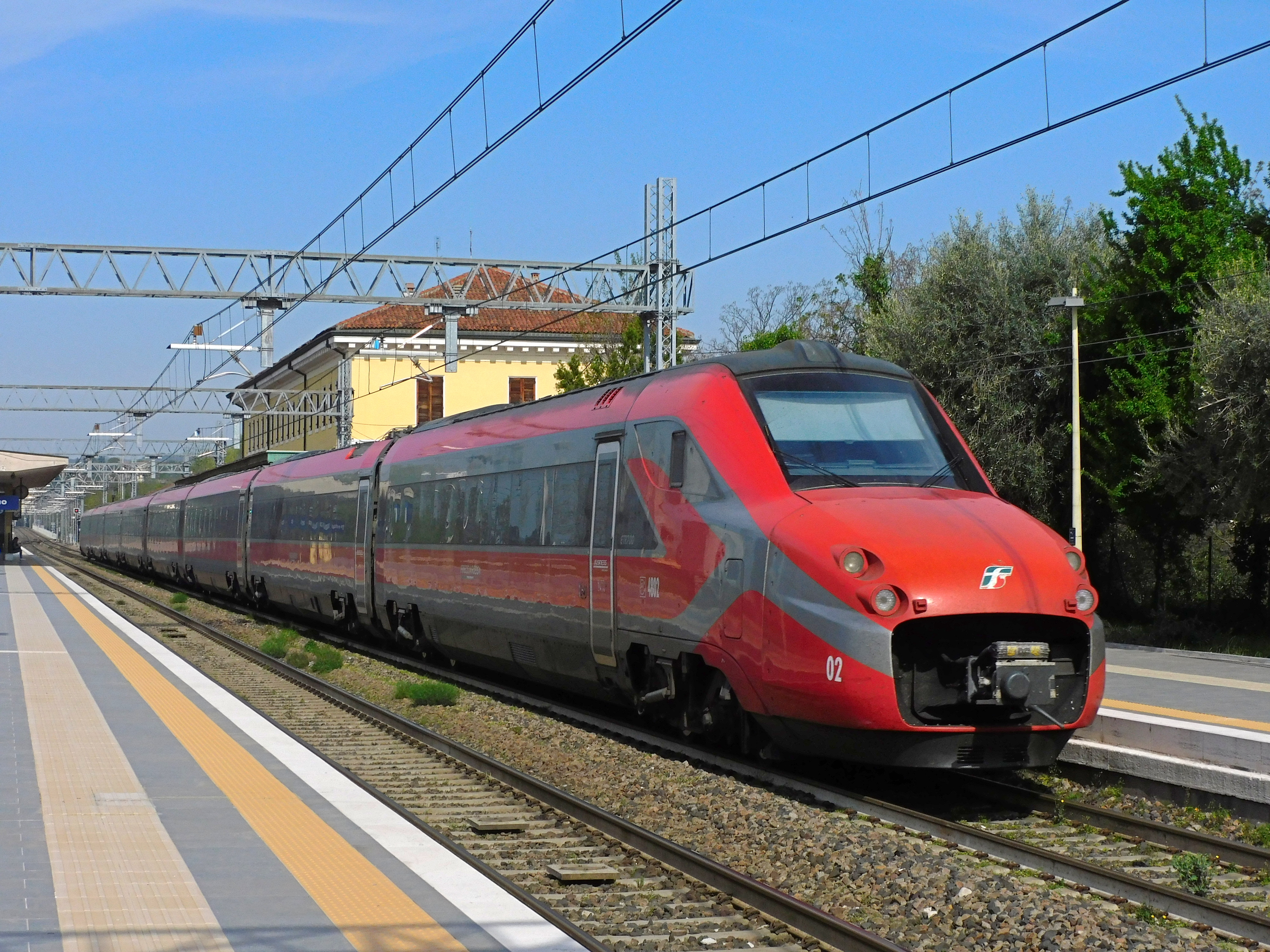
- Frecciarossa ETR.700 at Desenzano del Garda-Sirmione

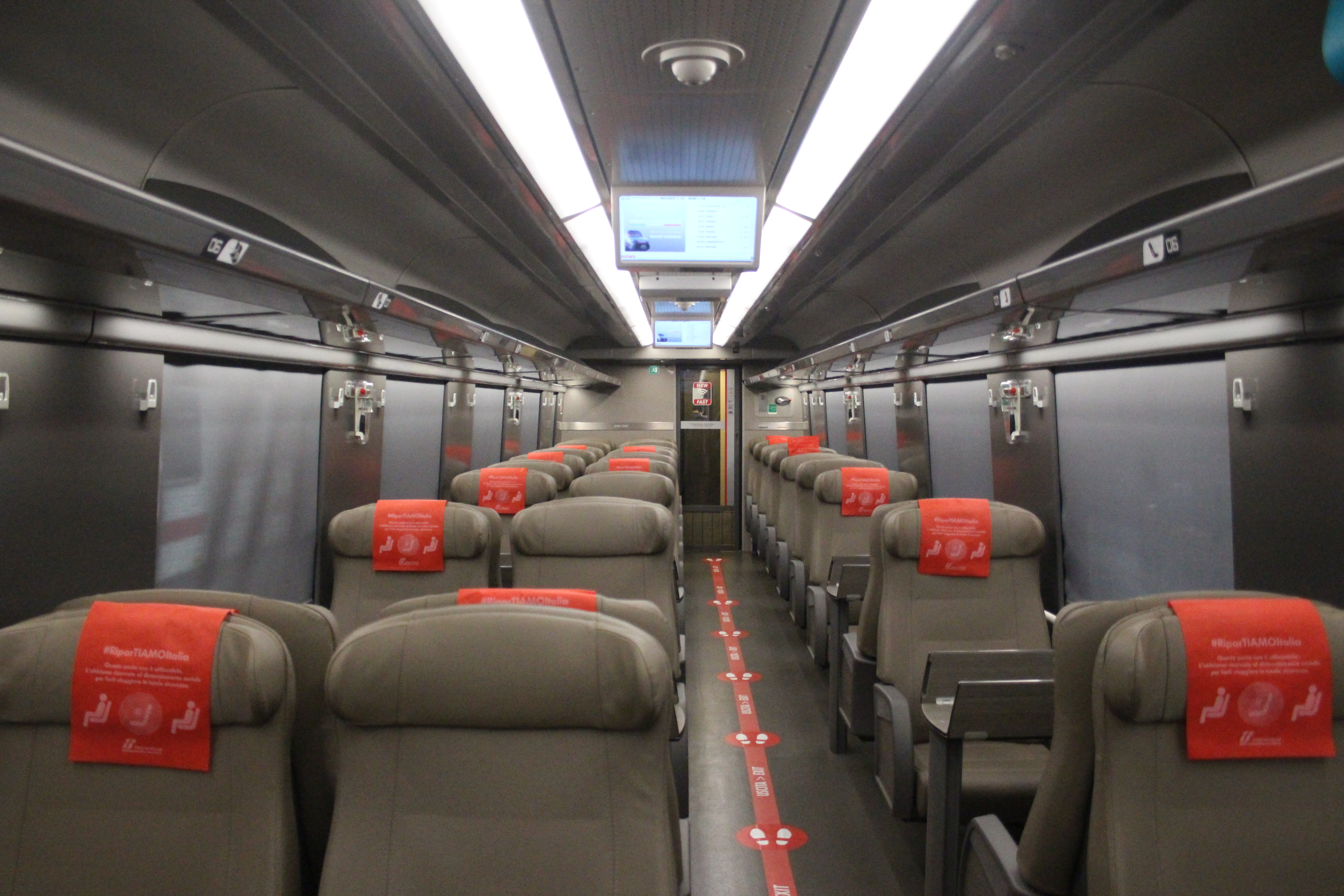
- Business-class interior of Frecciargento ETR.700
- In service: 2012–2013 (High Speed Alliance); 2019–present (Trenitalia)
- Manufacturer: AnsaldoBreda
- Designer: Pininfarina
- Built at: Pistoia
- Constructed: 2004–2011
- Entered service: 9 December 2012 (High Speed Alliance); 9 June 2019 (Trenitalia)
- Refurbished: 2019 (into ETR 700)
- Retired: 2013 (High Speed Alliance)
- Number built: 19
- Number in service: 17
- Formation: 8-car sets mAk+AD+mAB+B+B+mB+B+mBk
- Fleet numbers: 4801-4816, 4881-4883
- Capacity: 546; 127 first, 419 second class
- Operators: High Speed Alliance; Trenitalia
- Depot: Amsterdam Watergraafsmeer
- Lines served: HSL-Zuid; HSL 4 SNCB line 25; Adriatic railway

Specifications
- Train length: 200.9 m (659 ft 1 7/16 in)
- Car length: driving cars 26.95 m (88 ft 5 in) intermediate cars 24.5 m (80 ft 4 9/16 in)
- Width: 2.87 m (9 ft 5 in)
- Height: 4.08 m (13 ft 4 5/8 in)
- Floor height: 1.26 m (4 ft 1 5/8 in)
- Doors: 24
- Articulated sections: 8
- Maximum speed: 250 km/h (155 mph)
- Weight: 423 t (416 long tons; 466 short tons) full loaded service weight 485 t (477 long tons; 535 short tons)
- Power output: 5,500 kW (7,400 hp)
- Acceleration: 0.58 m/s^{2} (2.1 km/(h⋅s); 1.3 mph/s) max
- Deceleration: 1.2 m/s^{2} (4.3 km/(h⋅s); 2.7 mph/s) max
- Electric systems: Overhead catenary: 25 kV 50 Hz AC; 3 kV DC; 1,500 V DC
- Current collection: Pantograph
- UIC classification: Bo′Bo′+2′2′+Bo′Bo′+2′2′+2′2′+Bo′Bo′+2′2′+Bo′Bo′
- Safety systems: TVM, BAcc/SCM; ETCS L2
- Track gauge: 1,435 mm (4 ft 8 1/2 in) standard gauge

The Trenitalia ETR 700, originally NS Hispeed V250, is a high-speed train designed by Pininfarina and built by AnsaldoBreda originally for NS International and NMBS/SNCB to operate on the Fyra service, a high-speed train between Amsterdam and Brussels with a branch to Breda on the newly built HSL-Zuid in the Netherlands and its extension HSL 4 in Belgium.

V250s were delivered with a significant delay. Full commercial services with V250 started on 9 December 2012 but stopped only 39 days later on 17 January 2013, after the Belgian Railway Inspection Agency suspended the trains' operating license, because of safety and structural problems with the construction and maintenance of the V250s. All were removed from service and sent back to AnsaldoBreda in Italy.

In August 2017, Trenitalia purchased all 19 V250 sets to expand its high-speed fleet and rebranded them as ETR700s. After being refurbished, they entered service on Frecciargento services, on the Adriatic railway, between Milan and Lecce in 2019. Seventeen sets will be used for services, with the remaining two used for spare parts.

== Background and history ==
During 2004, it was announced that the Dutch train operator NS International and the Belgian national train operator NMBS/SNCB had placed a joint order for 19 V250 train sets that were intended for new high speed operations between Amsterdam and Brussels and Breda on the HSL-Zuid and HSL 4 high-speed railway lines. The initial delivery date was originally forecast to take place in 2007; However, by April 2008, it was stated that deliveries were now expected to take place by 2009 while the fleet's introduction to service was scheduled to occur by the middle of 2009.

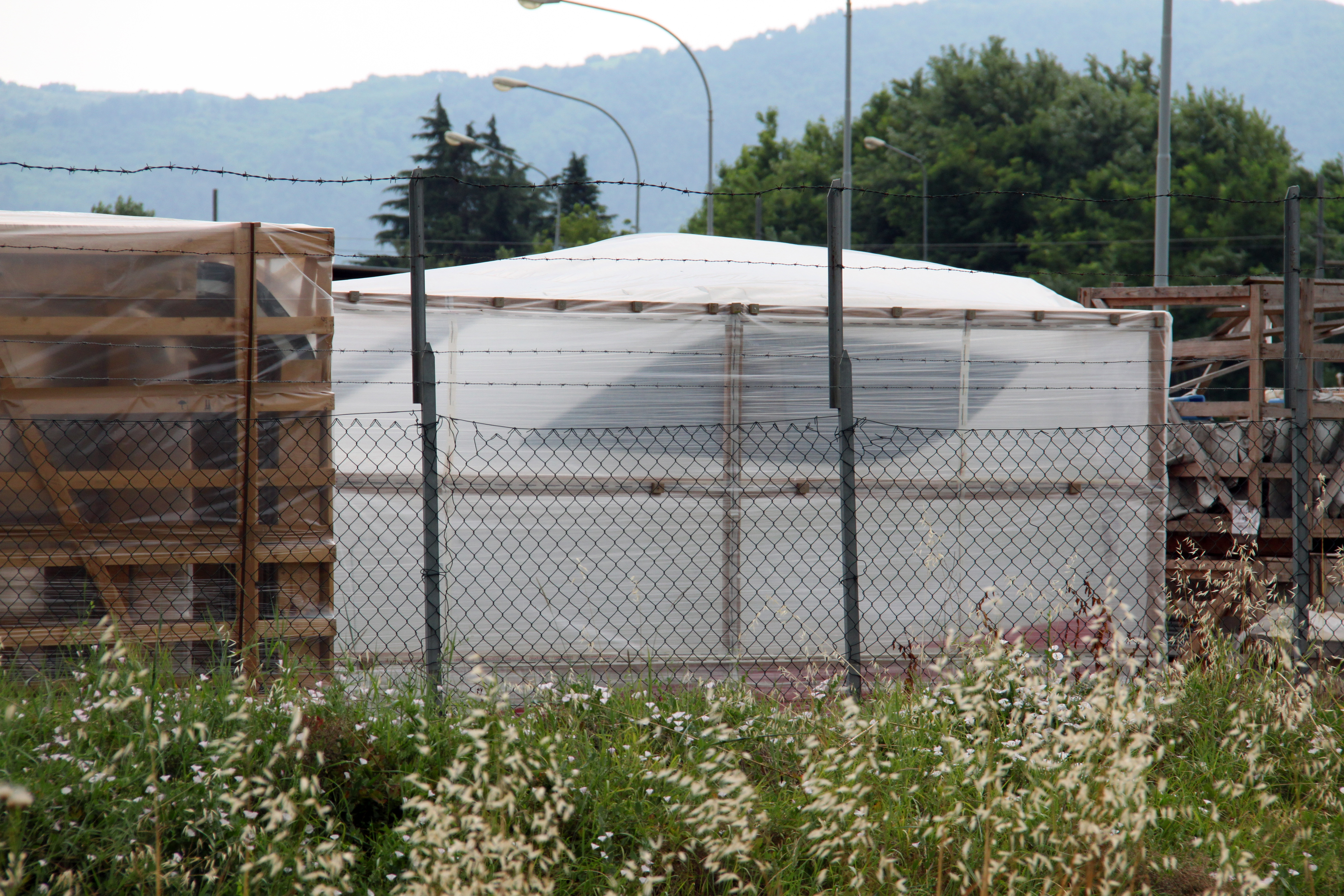
Front of a V250 in Italy

By March 2009, manufacture of the first sets had been completed; in the following weeks, initial test runs were performed on the Velim test circuit in the Czech Republic. During April 2009, the first unit arrived in Arnhem in the Netherlands, and was towed to Amsterdam for tests. Around this time, NS International claimed that the type's introduction had been delayed due to the lack of a formal ETCS level 2 specification; by March 2009, HSA was allegedly close to financial ruin due to lack of any income; the firm's fiscal circumstances led to a re-organisation of track access charges for the unused HSL-Zuid line being arranged with the Dutch government.

On 7 July 2009, the service, branded Fyra, was introduced, along with the formal presentation of the prototype V250 train, at the high-speed train depot at Watergraafsmeer in the Netherlands. Thereafter, the prototype underwent testing on both high-speed lines, at which point there was an expected in-service date for the fleet of Autumn 2010, The introduction of any service on the HSL-Zuid had been delayed due to problems with the ETCS signalling system, and the line was built without any legacy safety system. In September 2009, services on the line commenced using conventional locomotive-hauled rolling stock, even though the introduction of level 2 ETCS coverage across on the whole line was not yet in place, and expected by June 2010.

During July 2010, the Dutch transport minister Camiel Eurlings stated that any introduction of a commercial V250 service on Dutch high-speed lines would not take place until December 2011. In March 2012, driver training on high-speed lines in the Netherlands began; at which point commercial use of the V250 was planned for September 2012.

In September 2012, a limited service of one return train every three hours between Amsterdam and Rotterdam began; the trains were also provisionally certified for use in Belgium that same month.

On 9 December 2012, regular Fyra service between Amsterdam and Brussels using the V250 sets commenced. However, following their introduction, the V250 fleet experienced numerous technical problems. On 16 January 2013, all V250s were suspended from commercial service, after only one month of service, due to reliability and safety concerns in snowy weather. Two days later, certification for the V250 in Belgium was revoked after a floor plate that had fallen off a V250 was found along the tracks.

The continuous problems with the V250 trains caused a public outcry in both Belgium and the Netherlands, including accusations in the Belgian and Dutch media that only financial considerations were behind the decision to grant the contract to AnsaldoBreda. Initially, the maximum speed requirements were fixed at 220 km/h (137 mph), which would have reduced the purchase cost per seat drastically. However, after comparing offers by Alstom (manufacturers of French TGV trains) and Siemens (who manufacture the German ICE trains) with that of AnsaldoBreda, it was revealed that the Italian producer offered a cheaper train with a higher top speed of 250 km/h (155 mph), which ultimately gave the Italian company the edge.

On 31 May 2013, the Belgian railway company NMBS/SNCB decided to stop the Fyra project, due to the many technical issues, and safety concerns. No trains had been delivered and the company refused delivery of the trains still on order, on the grounds that the manufacturer was unable to resolve the numerous issues within the contractually allowed three-month period.

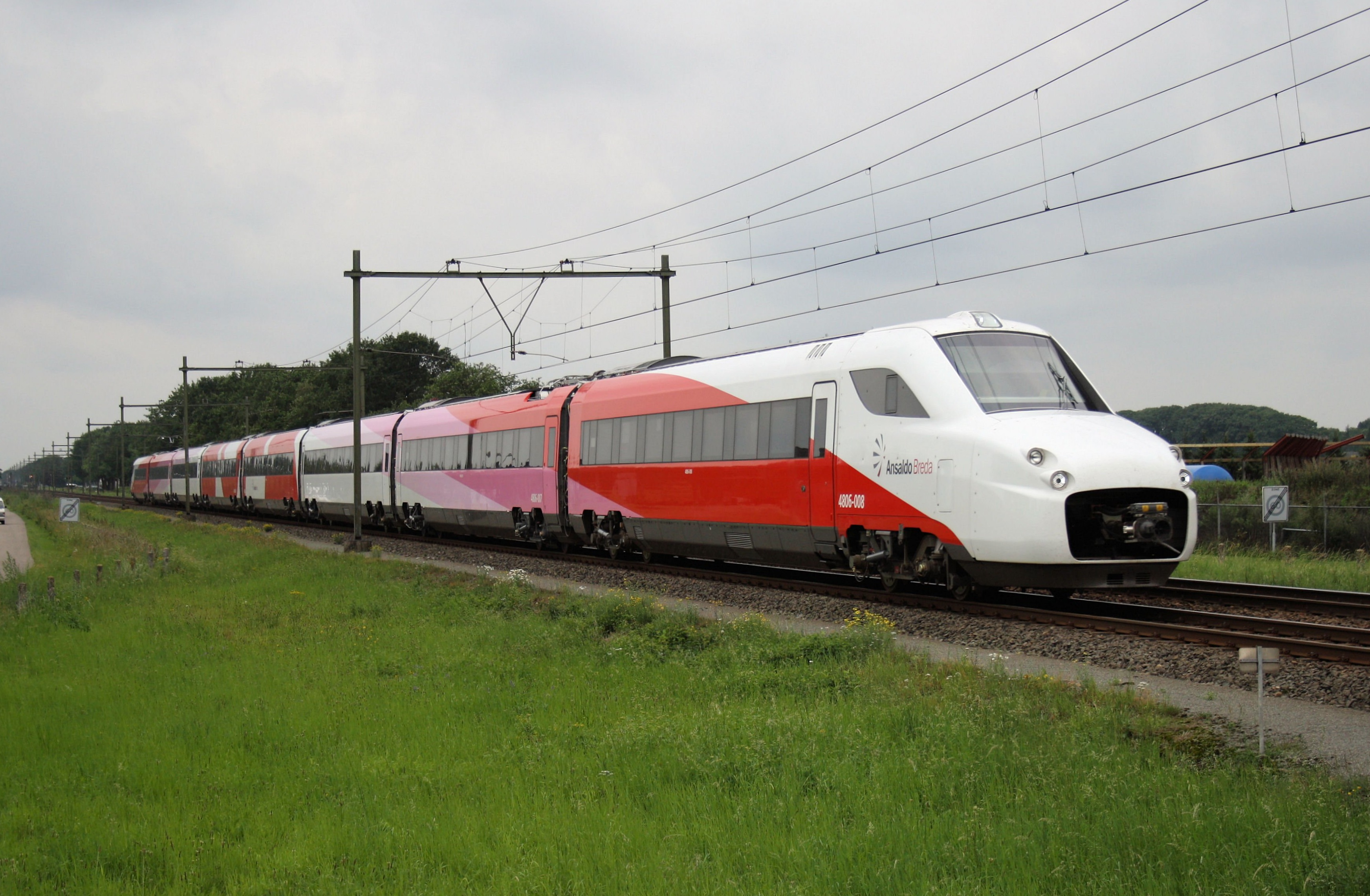
Fyra V250 in service in the Netherlands

On 3 June 2013, the Dutch national railway company NS announced that it had made a similar evaluation, and expressed its desire to cancel the V250 project. The Dutch department of finance agreed, and recommended that NS do "everything in its power" to get a refund from AnsaldoBreda. At a press conference on 6 June 2013, the manufacturer claimed that the trains had been handled poorly by running them too fast (i.e. at maximum commercial speed of 250 km/h (155 mph)) under snow conditions. AnsaldoBreda also threatened to sue the railways for the damage to its reputation. A report published by the consultancy firm Mott MacDonald showed how the train design was meeting most specifications agreed in the contract, but the manufactured trainsets had technical issues that required up to 17 months to be solved. The report also stated that the quality inspection paperwork as documented during manufacturing did not represent the actual build quality.

On 17 March 2014, NS announced a settlement with AnsaldoBreda had been reached. The nine NS trains would be returned to AnsaldoBreda for a refund of €125 million, €88m less than originally paid; furthermore, NS would receive an additional compensation for each resold unit to a maximum of €21m. In May 2014, NMBS/SNCB, AnsaldoBreda and its controlling company Finmeccanica announced that they reached a settlement that confirms the cancellation of the train orders and included a payment of €2.5m to NMBS/SNCB.

In August 2017, Trenitalia purchased all 19 V250 sets to expand its high-speed fleet and rebranded them as ETR700s. Seventeen sets will be used for services, with the remaining two used as sources of spare parts. During February 2019, testing of the sets started. The first four entered on 9 June 2019 on Frecciargento services on the Adriatic railway between Milan and Ancona with all to be in service by early 2020 with services extended to Lecce.

== Design ==
The eight-car sets are designed to operate on 3 kV DC, 1.5 kV DC and 25 kV 50 Hz AC overhead power supply, allowing operations on both Dutch and Belgian electrified networks. Traction is distributed with alternating powered and trailer vehicles in MTMTTMTM formation. (Note: M indicates a powered vehicle (motor), T an unpowered vehicle (trailer)) Electric traction power is controlled by water-cooled IGBT inverters powering asynchronous motors. They are fitted with ETCS Level 2 and local train safety systems.

The carriage bodies are constructed of aluminium, except the driving cab, which is of steel. Three of the coaches are used for first-class accommodation, giving 127 first-class seats out of a total seated capacity of 546. First-class seating is in [2+1] formation, second in [2+2] formation. The design company Pininfarina also contributed to the design.

== Interior ==
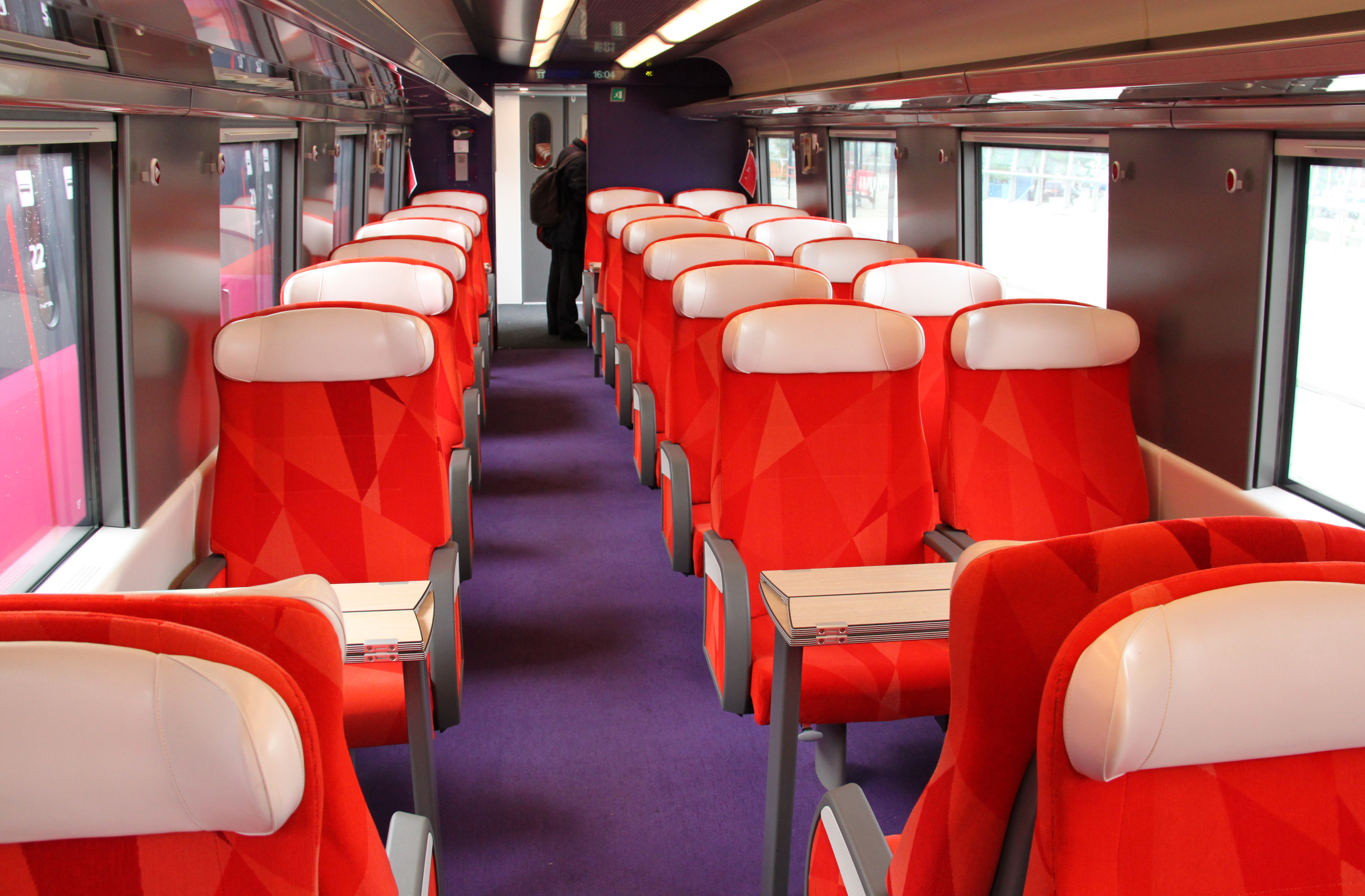
First-class interior of Fyra

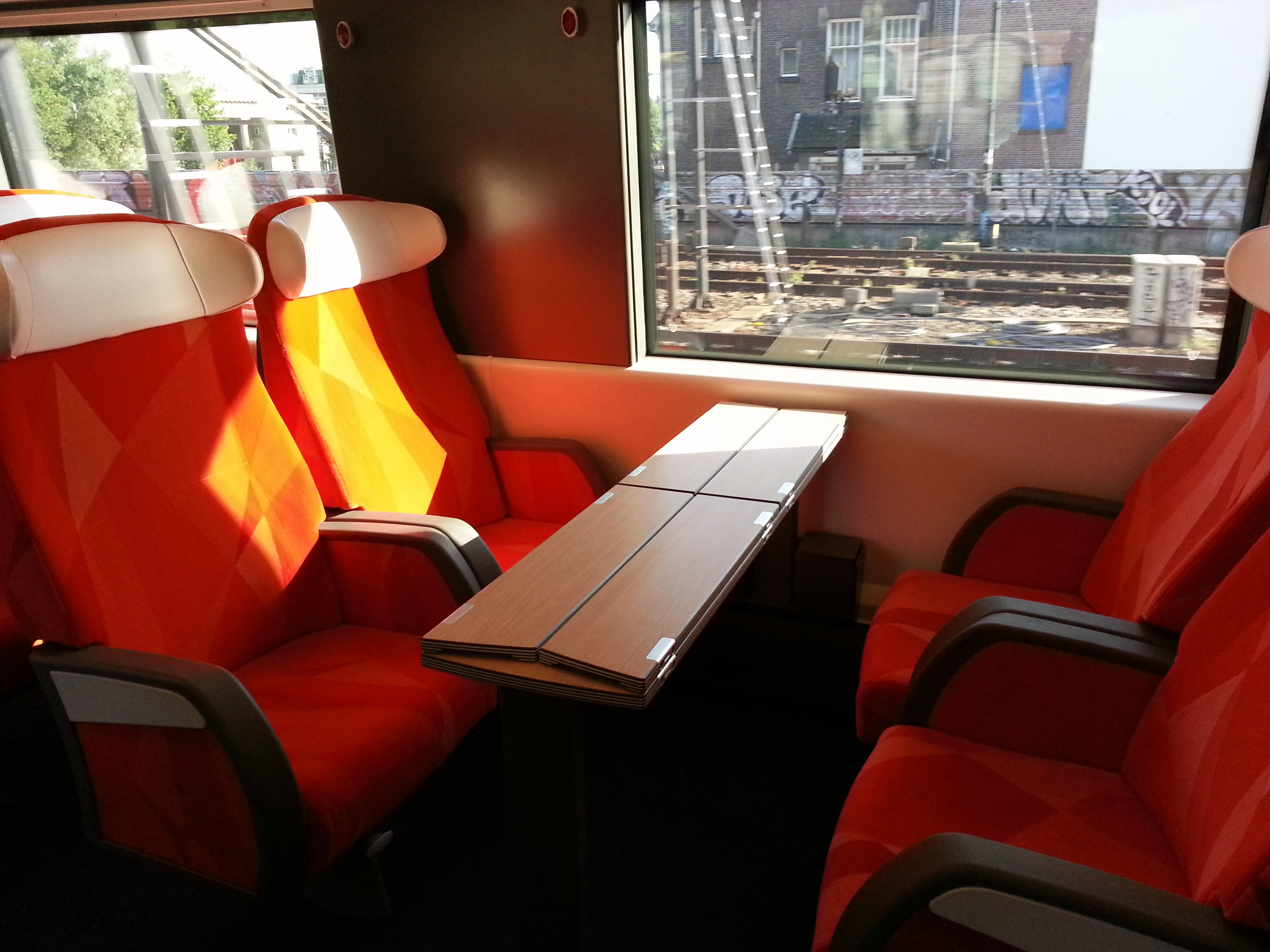
First-class interior of Fyra

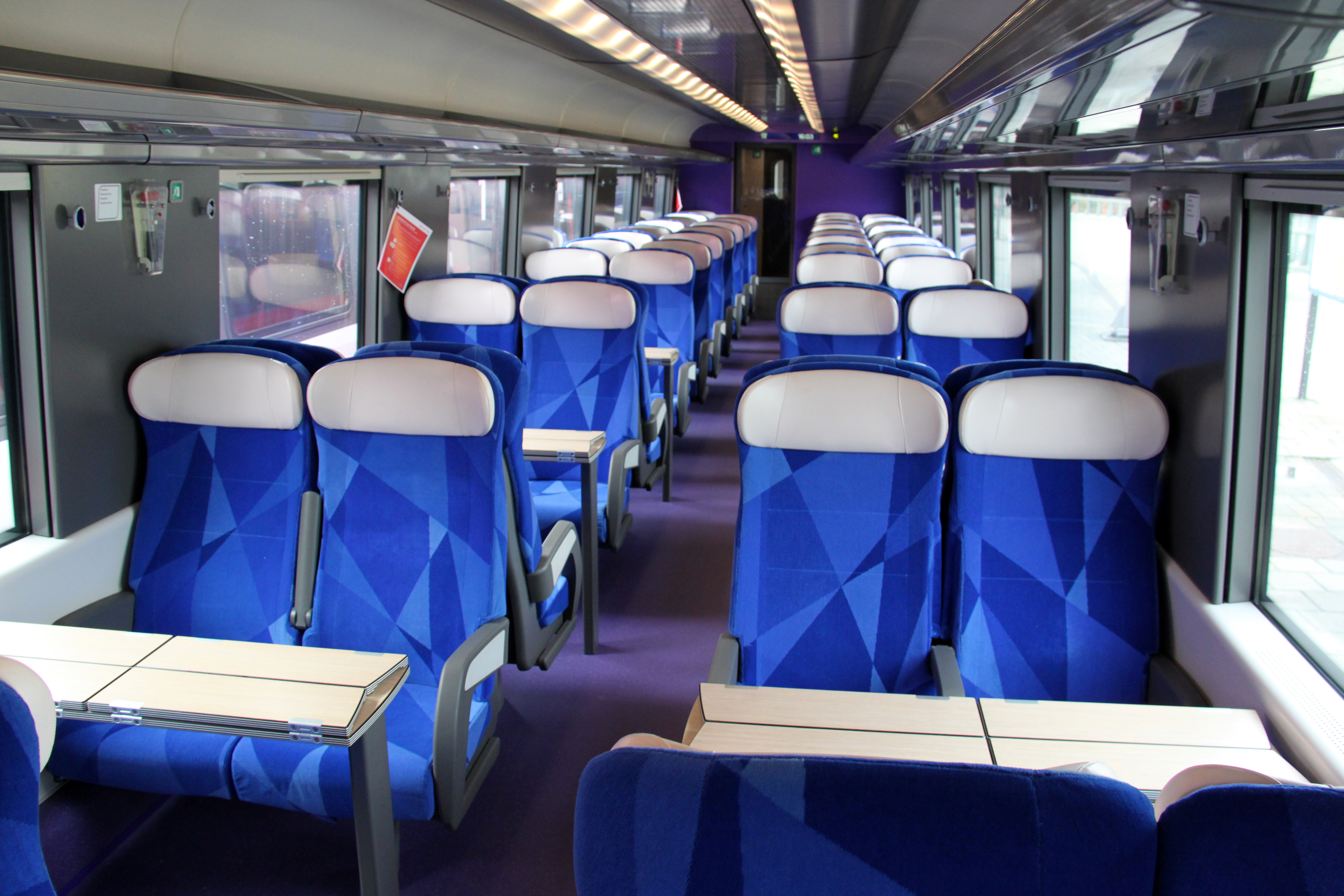
Second-class interior of Fyra

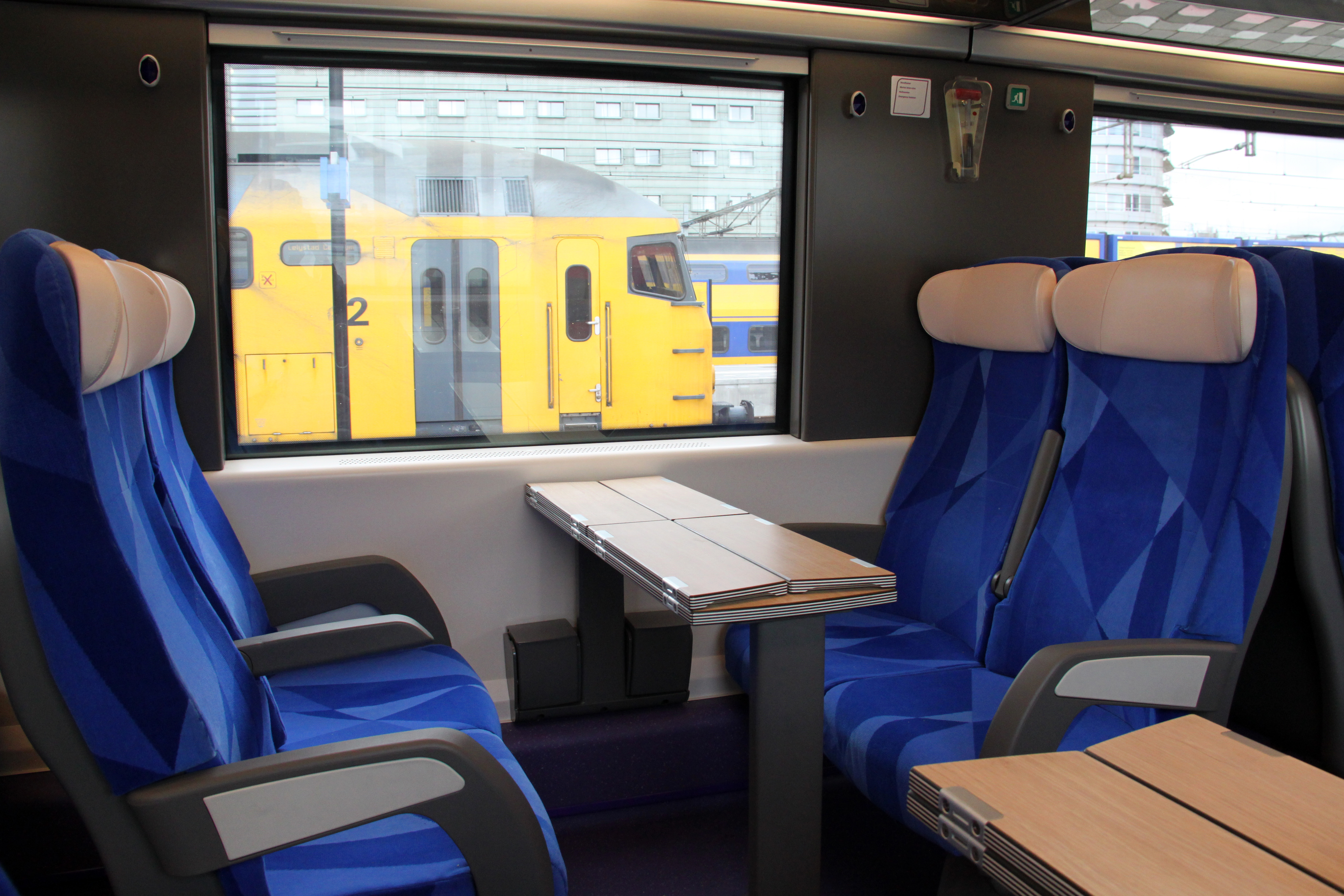
Second-class interior of Fyra

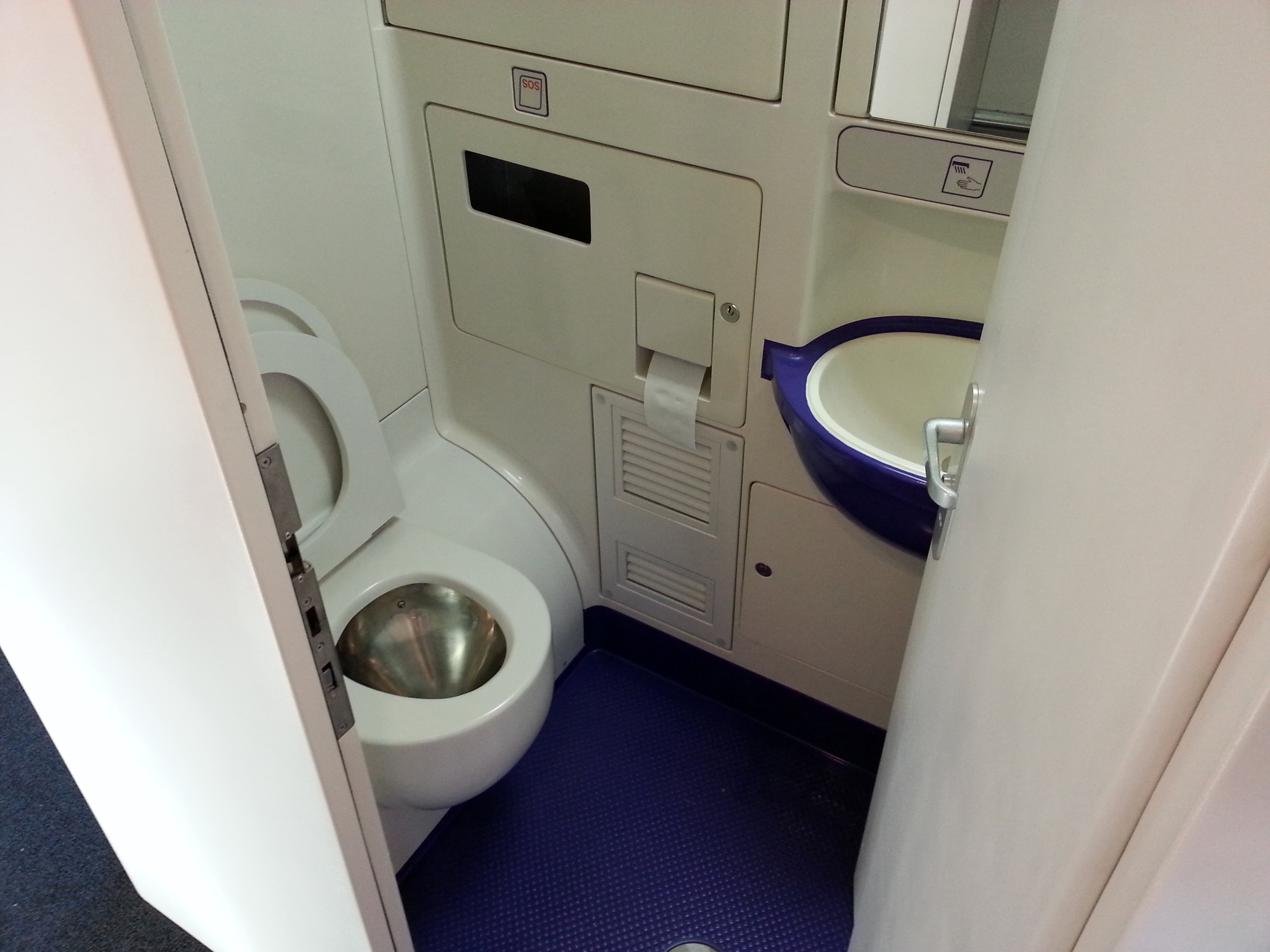
Toilet
