= Fyra =

European high-speed rail service

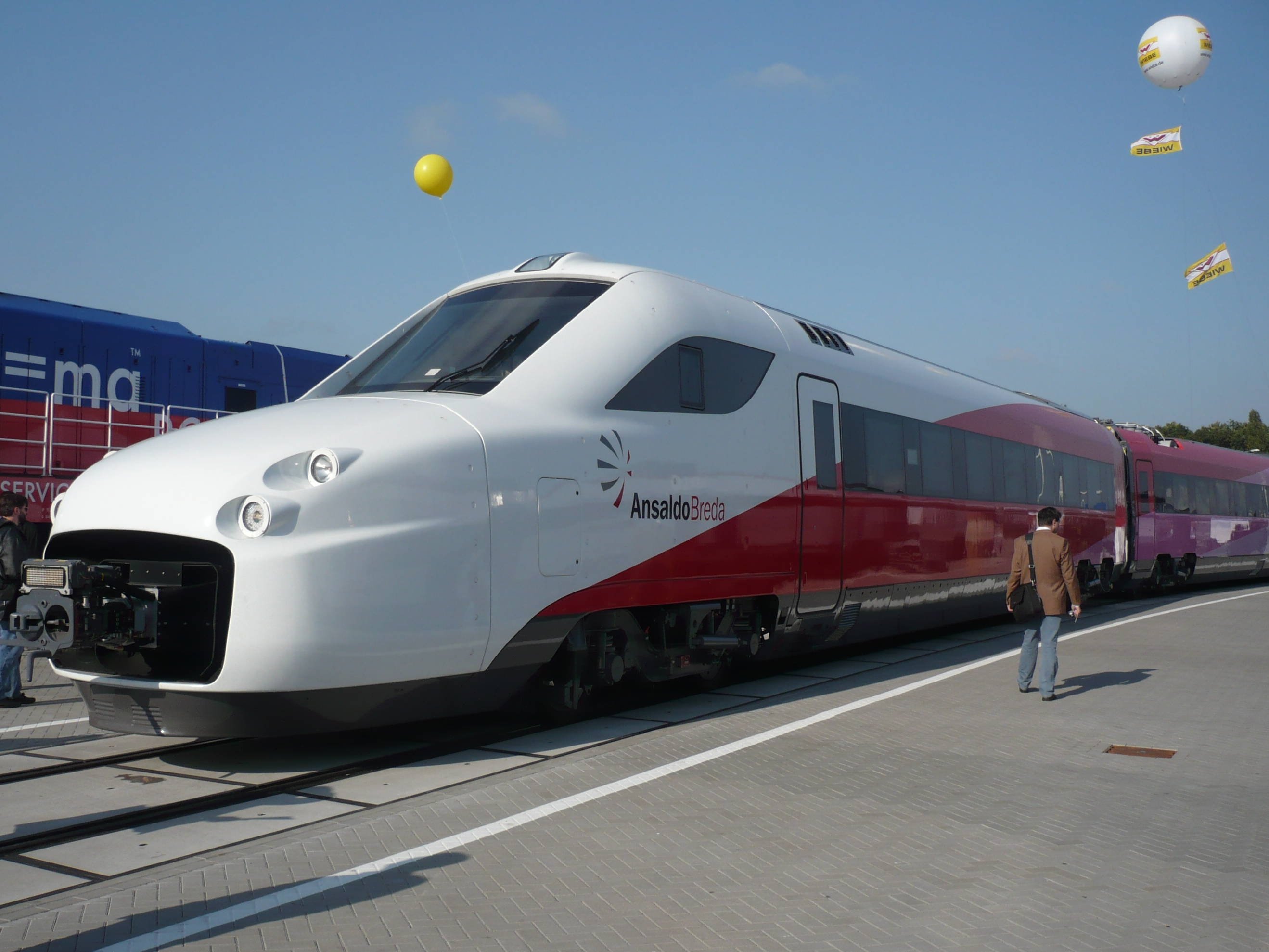
- A V250 at Innotrans 2008 in Berlin
- Franchises: International joint operation Service began in 2009
- Main stations: Amsterdam Centraal, Schiphol Airport, Rotterdam Centraal, Breda, Antwerpen-Centraal, Brussel-Centraal; Brussel-Zuid/Bruxelles-Midi
- Fleet: 19 V250 sets (AnsaldoBreda); NS Hispeed class 186
- Stations called at: 10 V250 (expected)
- Parent company: NS International and NMBS/SNCB

Other
- Website: www.nsinternational.nl

Fyra (Dutch: [ˈfiːraː]) was a short-lived international high-speed rail service between the Netherlands and Belgium using the AnsaldoBreda V250 train. The service used the HSL-Zuid and HSL 4 railway lines to connect Amsterdam, Schiphol Airport, Rotterdam, Antwerp and Brussels. It operated for a mere 6 weeks around the New year of 2013, before continuous technical difficulties forced its suspension. It was permanently halted due to reliability and safety concerns.

The high-profile project was a collaboration between NS International (a joint venture of NS and KLM) and NMBS/SNCB.

A Dutch domestic service also using HSL-Zuid was branded under the same name. Despite using the tracks built for high speed trains the service between Amsterdam and Breda used conventional trains propelled by a TRAXX locomotive. Its name was changed to Intercity Direct to avoid confusion with the failed international service.

The name "Fyra" represents pride, and is derived from the Dutch word fier and the French word fière, both meaning proud. Fyra is also the Swedish word for four, and is said to represent the four important cities which the new trains were intended to serve — Amsterdam, Rotterdam, Antwerp and Brussels.

== Operations ==
NS International services started at Amsterdam Centraal station. They comprised two trains per hour to Rotterdam, two trains per hour to Breda and one train every one or two hours to Antwerp and Brussels. All trains stopped at both Schiphol Airport and Rotterdam. Services outside the Netherlands were operated in conjunction with NMBS/SNCB, Belgium's national railway operator.

An hourly high-speed service between Amsterdam, Schiphol Airport and Rotterdam was introduced in September 2009. In October 2010 this was increased to a half-hourly service, and in April 2011 the service was extended to Breda. On 29 July 2012 the V250 made its first revenue earning service carrying passengers from Amsterdam to Rotterdam and back. The service to Antwerp and Brussels started on 9 December 2012. The service was temporarily suspended after various major technical difficulties on 17 January 2013.

After the manufacturer had been proven unable to address the issues as contractually stipulated, NMBS/SNCB permanently withdrew the service and cancelled the contract for the delivery of 3 trains on 31 May 2013. NMBS/SNCB sought the refund of its downpayment, and maybe also damages.

== Reputation ==
The Fyra had a poor reputation for reliability. After a month of operations more than 5% of all trains were cancelled and fewer than 45% of them ran to time. In the middle of January 2013 further problems arose: 3 trains were damaged because of ice (among other technical problems). Further commercial service was even forbidden by the Belgian rail safety regulator. This led to several complaints from user associations and tourist information services. Both the Dutch and Belgian parliaments held hearings about the problems during May 2015.

The continuous problems with Fyra caused public outcry in both Belgium and the Netherlands, including accusations in the Belgian and Dutch media that only financial considerations were behind the decision to purchase V250 trains from AnsaldoBreda. Initially the maximum speed requirements were fixed at 220 km/h, which would have reduced the purchase cost per seat drastically. After comparing offers by Alstom (manufacturers of the French TGV) and Siemens (who manufacture the German ICE trains) with that of AnsaldoBreda, however, it transpired that the Italian producer was able to offer a cheaper train with a higher speed of 250 km/h, which ultimately gave the Italian company the edge. The V250's failure in January 2013 and its ultimate withdrawal from service spawned Dutch-language nicknames such as "Spaghetti-boemel" (slow spaghetti train, referring to the Dutch nickname for Italians: Spaghettivreter, "Spaghetti eater") and "ALDI-trein" (ALDI-train) after the German discount supermarket chain. This latter triggered protests from ALDI's management.

== End of service ==
On 31 May 2013, NMBS/SNCB announced that it would exit the Fyra project and cancel the contract with AnsaldoBreda. on the basis of technical issues which remained unresolved during the contractual period of three months. NMBS/SNCB further noted that the late delivery alone would be sufficient reason to annul the contract. In a press conference Marc Descheemaecker, former CEO of NMBS/SNCB illustrated his arguments; a metallic strip affixed to the roof had come undone on a moving train and had bent upwards towards the overhead cables, a potentially dangerous situation. Rust was found on an axle of a nearly new train which could lead to premature breakage. Other areas were also badly affected by stray current corrosion blamed on inconsistent assembly. In all there were 26 top issues which needed resolving. The problems were confirmed by reports from external partners Mott MacDonald (commissioned by NMBS/SNCB and NS) and Concept Risk (commissioned by NMBS/SNCB). NS engineers also subjected two partial trains to a standardised test, known as a stofkamanalyse (fine-toothed comb test) in which they scored 1,157 and 2,019 penalty points respectively, where the usual ceiling for approval is only 10 points. Although all problems were theoretically resolvable it was estimated this would take at least 17 months and the sheer number of issues would prohibit a practical inspection regime. Additionally, the lengthy repair scenario was considered risky due to the poor financial situation of the manufacturer, which a report by Ernst & Young illustrated with a solvency of -47.5% and low credit ratings for its parent company Finmeccanica.

On 3 June 2013 NS also announced that the V250 was no longer considered a viable option. The decision was confirmed four days later by the Dutch government, and NS was given until October to come up with a new plan to use HSL-Zuid.

The failure also led to a parliamentary investigation into the project in the Netherlands. In Belgium the justice department was asked to investigate the public procurement procedure and the Court of Audit was to be asked to investigate the project.

In a press conference on 6 June, AnsaldoBreda dismissed the reports as "baseless and unfounded", and claimed that the trains had been handled poorly by being run too fast (i.e. at maximum commercial speed of 250 km/h) under snow conditions. Two legal attempts by AnsaldoBreda to obtain information from the reports were rejected by the Dutch courts.

In September 2013 NMBS/SNCB filed compensation claims of €40 million against AnsaldoBreda seeking a refund of cash paid in advance for three trains that it had never accepted. In October AnsaldoBreda filed a lawsuit in the Netherlands against NS seeking payment for the seven trains not accepted by NS as well as damages for alleged breach of contract. On 25 September NS filed a claim against Finmeccanica seeking reimbursement for the trains it wanted to return to AnsaldoBreda as well as compensation and damages.

On 17 March 2014 NS announced that it had reached a settlement with AnsaldoBreda. The 9 NS trains would be returned to AnsaldoBreda for a refund of €125 million, €88 million less than originally paid. NS would receive additional compensation for each resold unit up to a maximum of €21 million.

== Rolling stock ==
NS International ordered 16 V250 trains from AnsaldoBreda, with NMBS/SNCB ordering a further 3 sets. They were used on Dutch domestic services and NS International services to Brussels. These sets are eight carriages long and have a top speed of 250 km/h. They entered service in December 2012 - five years later than originally planned. They were taken out of service the following month due to numerous technical issues. Four months later only two of the 9 already delivered trains were still capable of performing test runs.

Between 2007 and 2008 in order to dispense with the increasingly unreliable Class 11 locomotives on the Amsterdam-Brussels service, NS International introduced 12 Bombardier Traxx F140 MS electric locomotives hired from Angel Trains, numbered in the range E186 111 to E186 122, augmented from 2011 by E186 144 and E186 239.

Class	Image	Type	Top speed		Number	Built	Notes
Class	Image	Type	mph	km/h	Number	Built	Notes
Traxx		Electric locomotive	100	160	14	2005–2007	Interim usage. Leased from Angel Trains.
ICRm (Prio)		Carriage	100	160	?		Amsterdam - Schiphol - Rotterdam - Breda, Amsterdam - Schiphol - Rotterdam
V250		Electric multiple unit	155	250	19 (planned; 9 delivered)	2009–2011	Tricurrent; taken out of service after less than two months due to suspension of operating licence following safety concerns
