= GamgokJanghowon station =

Rail station in South Korea

감곡장호원
GamgokJanghowon

Korean name
- Hangul: 감곡장호원역
- Hanja: 甘谷長湖院驛
- Revised Romanization: Gamgokjanghowonyeok
- McCune–Reischauer: Kamgokchanghowŏnyŏk

General information
- Location: 312-1 Wangjang-ri, Eumseong County, Chungcheongbuk-do; South Korea
- Operator: Korail
- Line: Jungbunaeryuk Line
- Platforms: 1
- Tracks: 2

Construction
- Structure type: Aboveground

History
- Opened: December 31, 2021

Services
Preceding station	Korea Train Express	Following station
Ganam towards Pangyo	Jungbunaeryuk KTX	Angseongoncheon towards Mungyeong
Location

GamgokJanghowon station (Korean: 감곡장호원역) is a railway station on the Jungbunaeryuk Line in South Korea.

== Station location and name dispute ==
There was a conflict between the residents of Janghowon-eup, Icheon City and Gamgok-myeon, Eumseong County regarding the location selection for the station. In 2014, the residents of Gamgok-myeon demanded that GamgokJanghowon Station be located 300 meters towards the Gamgok-myeon direction. In 2015, the Korea National Railway proposed a compromise by moving the station location approximately 35 meters towards Gamgok-myeon and increasing the size of the station by 30 meters towards Gamgok-myeon. While the residents of Gamgok-myeon accepted this compromise, a dispute arose over the station name. In 2015, the residents of Janghowon-eup suggested that the station should be named Janghowon Station. However, the Ministry of Land, Infrastructure and Transport supported the residents of Gamgok-myeon, resulting in the station being named GamgokJanghowon Station. Nevertheless, this decision continues to be a subject of ongoing controversy.
