= Chungju station =

Train station in South Korea

충주
Chungju
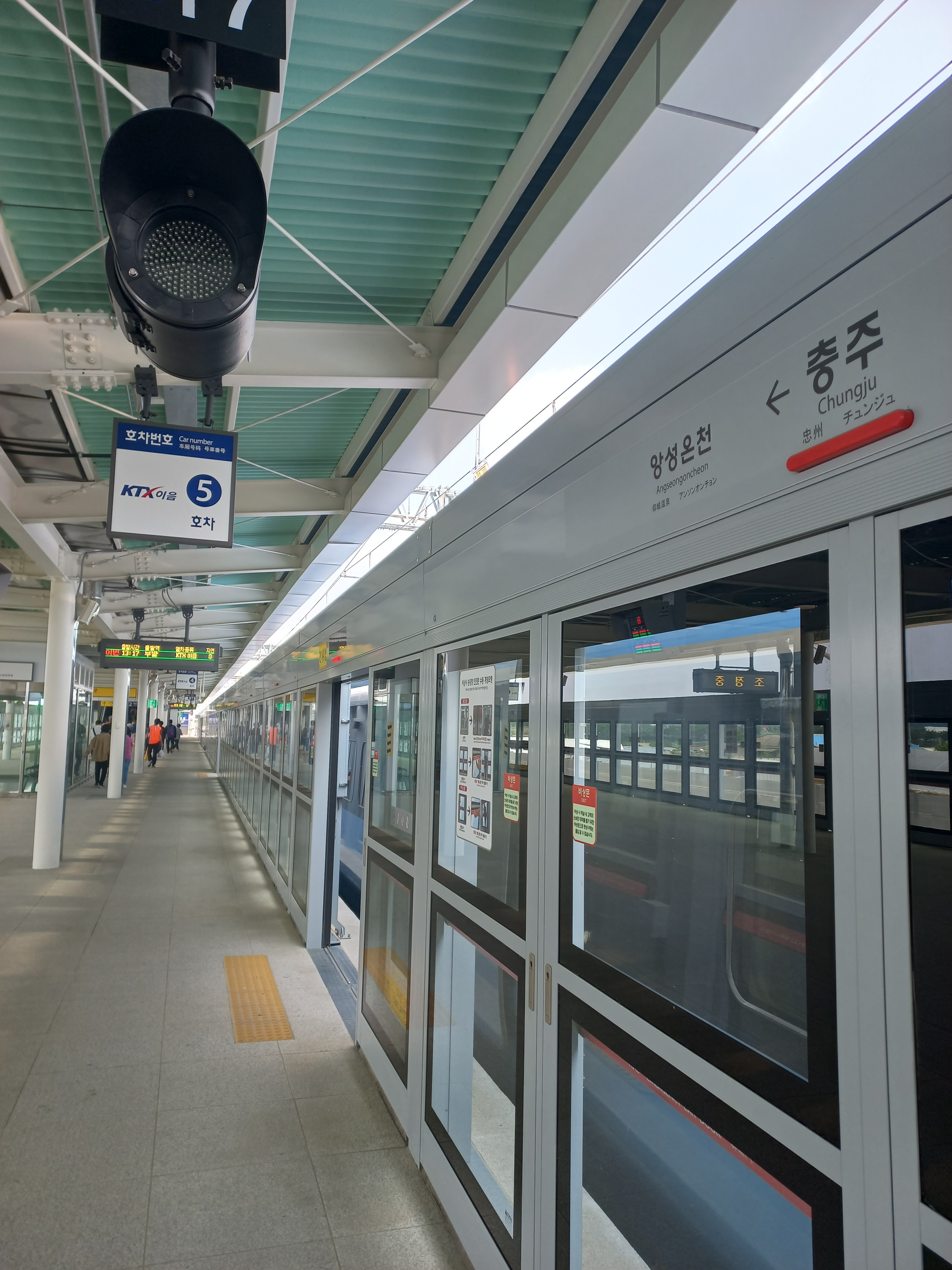
- KTX platform

Korean name
- Hangul: 충주역
- Hanja: 忠州驛
- RR: Chungju-yeok
- MR: Ch'ungju-yŏk

General information
- Location: Chungju, North Chungcheong
- Coordinates: 36.97607°N 127.90878°E
- Operator: Korail
- Lines: Chungbuk Line, Jungbunaeryuk Line
- Platforms: 3
- Tracks: 6

Construction
- Structure type: Aboveground

History
- Opened: December 25, 1928

Services
Preceding station	Korea Train Express	Following station
Angseongoncheon towards Pangyo	Jungbunaeryuk KTX	Salmi towards Mungyeong
Location

Chungju station (Korean: 충주역) is a railway station on Chungbuk Line and Jungbunaeryuk Line in Chungju, North Chungcheong, South Korea.
