= List of high-speed railway lines =

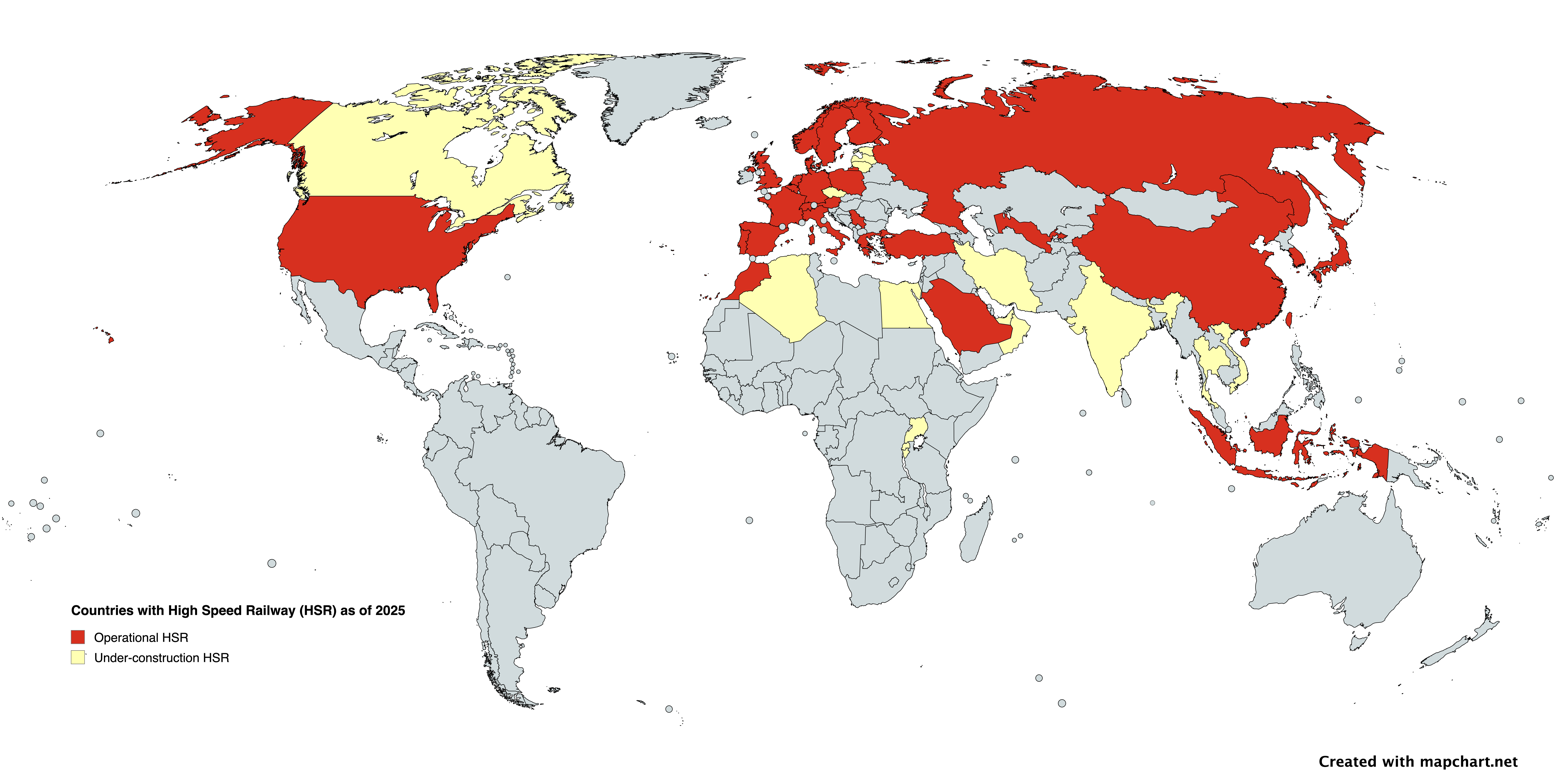
Countries with high-speed railway lines operational (red) and under-construction (yellow) as of 2025

This article provides a list of operational and under construction high-speed rail networks, listed by country or region. While the International Union of Railways defines high-speed rail as public transport by rail at speeds of at least 200 km/h (124 mph) for upgraded tracks and 250 km/h (155 mph) or faster for new tracks. This article lists all the systems and lines that support speeds over 200 km/h (125 mph) regardless of their statuses of upgraded or newly built.

== Overview ==
=== Operational networks ===
The following table is an overview of high-speed rail in service and under construction by country. It shows all the high speed lines (speed of 200 km/h (125 mph) or over) in service. The list is based on UIC figures (International Union of Railways), updated with other sources.

Operational length in km:
1. China: 50,400 (65.0%)
2. Spain: 3,973 (5.12%)
3. France: 3,516 (4.53%)
4. Japan: 3,067 (3.96%)
5. Germany: 2,683 (3.46%)
6. Sweden: 1,711 (2.21%)
7. South Korea: 1,548 (2.00%)
8. United Kingdom: 1,485 (1.92%)
9. Italy: 1,312 (1.69%)
10. Others: 7,839 (10.1%)

Country or region	Continent	Operational length (km)	Under construction (km)	Total length (km)	Density (m/km^{2})	Length (km) per 100,000 people (Note: Population data is based on worldometers.info, as of July 2024)	Top speed (km/h)	Electrification	Track gauge (mm)	Opened
Austria	Europe	410.2 (Note: Koralm, Western and New Lower Valley Inn Railway lines.)	230.3	640.5	4.89	4.58	250	15 kV 16.7 Hz AC	1435	1990
Belgium	Europe	260.8 (Note: High-speed rail in Belgium)	60.9 (Note: Diabolo project+Line 50A)	321.7	6.6	2.23	300	3 kV DC, (Note: at stations); 25 kV 50 Hz AC	1435	1997
China	Asia	50,400	19,600	70,000	5.26	3.58	350 (Note: Between 2011 and 2017 the top speed has been decreased from 350 to 310 km/h (220 to 190 mph) on all tracks and lines.)	25 kV 50 Hz AC	1435	2004
Czech Republic	Europe	30.228	0	30.228	0.38	0.28	200	25 kV 50 Hz AC	1435	2025
Denmark	Europe	60	139.7	199.7	0.68	0.98	200	25 kV 50 Hz AC	1435	2019
Finland	Europe	987.1	0	987.1	2.92	17.8	220	25 kV 50 Hz AC	1524 (Note: Rolling stock is ready to be used on 1520 mm network abroad.)	2006
France	Europe	3,516.346	372	3,888.346	5.77	5.73	320 (Note: 574.8 km/h record; 300 km/h first exceeded in 1950s)	25 kV 50 Hz AC (Note: 1,5 kV DC or 3 kV DC at some upgraded lines) (Note: gas turbine and propeller tested)	1435	1981 (Note: as dedicated line; conventional exceeded 200 km/h in late 1960s)
Germany	Europe	2,683.14	997.7	3,680.84	7.52	3.22	300	15 kV 16.7 Hz AC (Note: diesel before 2017)	1435	1991
Greece	Europe	160 (Note: P.A.Th.E./P. sections supporting at least 200km/h are summed here.)	230	390	1.21	1.55	200	25 kV 50 Hz AC	1435	2022
Hong Kong	Asia	26	0	26	23.51	0.35	200	1.5 kV DC, 25 kV 50 Hz AC	1435	2018
Indonesia	Asia	143	0	143	0.08	0.05	350	27.5 kV 50 Hz AC	1435	2023
Italy	Europe	1,312.464	1,181.068	2,493.532	4.36	2.23	300	25 kV 50 Hz AC, 3 kV DC	1435	1977
Japan	Asia	3,067	497.6	3,564.6	9.07	2.5	320	25 kV 50/60 Hz AC	1435 (Note: 1435+1067 dual gauge in the Seikan tunnel)	1964
Morocco	Africa	186	747	933	0.26	0.49	320	25 kV 50 Hz AC	1435	2018
Netherlands	Europe	175 (Note: HSL Zuid (125 km) + Hanzelijn (50 km))	0	175	4.18	1.95	300 (Note: Eurostar (international) trains only, local high-speed trains (V250) failed to launch (250 km/h). 200 km/h trains started operation April 2023 (ICNG trains).)	1.5 kV DC, (Note: upgraded lines and stations only); 25 kV 50 Hz AC (Note: HSL-Zuid only)	1435	2009
Norway	Europe	173 (Note: Gardermoen Line (64 km) + Vestfold Line (70 km out of 138 km) + Follo (22 km)+Dovre Line (17 km))	208.6	381.6	0.54	3.16	210	15 kV 16.7 Hz AC	1435	1998
Poland	Europe	285.047 (Note: High-speed rail in Poland)	224	509.047	0.91	0.75	200	3 kV DC	1435	2014
Portugal	Europe	224 (Note: Linha do Norte (116.2 out of 336 km) + Linha do Sul (107 out of 274 km))	90 (Note: Additionally, the 10km extension from Elvas to the border.)	314	2.67	2.19	220	25 kV 50 Hz AC	1668	1999
Russia	Europe	650	680	1,330	0.04	0.42	250	3 kV DC, 25 kV 50 Hz AC (Note: Diesel above 200 km/h tested)	1520	1984
Saudi Arabia	Asia	450	950	1,400	0.21	1.22	300	25 kV 50 Hz AC (Note: Diesel push-pull trains also capable for 200 km/h, but limited to 180 km/h)	1435	2018
Serbia	Europe	185	193	378	0.79	0.98	200	25 kV 50 Hz AC	1435	2022
South Korea	Asia	1,548.7	1,122.1	2,670.8	15.43	2.99	305	25 kV 60 Hz AC	1435	2004
Spain	Europe	3,973	1,034	5,007	7.84	8.42	300 (Note: 310 in 2007-2016; 330 km/h designed)	3 kV DC, (Note: wide-gauge and upgraded lines only); 25 kV 50 Hz AC (Note: Diesel or bi-mode on some of upgraded lines)	1435; 1668 (Note: gauge-change trains in use; wide-gauge is limited 220-250 km/h)	1992
Sweden	Europe	1,711	640 (Note: Under construction lines)	2,351	3.8	16.12	200 (Note: 250 km/h ready (ERTMS re-signaling needed).)	15 kV 16.7 Hz AC	1435	1990
Switzerland	Europe	164 (Note: High-speed rail in Switzerland)	232.5	396.5	3.97	1.86	230	15 kV 16.7 Hz AC	1435	2005
Taiwan	Asia	351	56.4	407.4	9.7	1.47	300	25 kV 60 Hz AC	1435	2007
Turkey	Europe/Asia	1,021 (Note: Sincan–Köseköy (313km) + Polatlı–Konya (212) + Kayaş–Sivas (394km) + Konya-Karaman (102km))	1,910 (Note: Under construction lines in Turkey.)	2,931	1.3	1.27	250	25 kV 50 Hz AC	1435	2009
United Kingdom	Europe	1,485.3	230	1,715.3	6.11	2.19	300 (Note: Eurostar (international) trains only. 330 km/h after completion of (HS2). The East Coast Main Line will be increased from 200 to 225 km/h after re-signaling.)	25 kV 50 Hz AC (Note: 750V DC Third-Rail at junctions only. Diesel is widely used despite ongoing electrification)	1435	1976
United States	North America	735	656 (Note: 275 km of CAHSR (Merced-Bakersfield); 351 km of Brightline West; and 30 km of Newark-Trenton being upgraded to allow 260 km/h service)	1,391	0.08	0.4	260	Multiple (Note: 12.5 kV 60 Hz AC (New Haven–New York), 12 kV 25 Hz AC (New York–Washington), 25 kV 60 Hz AC (Boston–New Haven)) (Note: gas-turbine and steam tested)	1435	1969
Uzbekistan	Asia	1,161 (Note: High-speed rail in Uzbekistan)	0	1,161	1.34	2.97	260	20 kV 50 Hz AC	1520	2011

==== By region ====
Operational length in km:
1. Asia: 58,168 (75.0%)
2. Europe: 18,445 (23.8%)
3. Africa: 186 (0.24%)
4. North America: 735 (0.95%)

Region	Continent	Operational length (km)	Under construction (km)	Total length (km)	Density (m/km^{2})	Length per 100,000 people (km)	Top speed (km/h)	Electrification	Common track gauge (mm)	Year opened
Africa		186	1,262	1,448	0.01	0.01	320	25 kV 50 Hz AC	1435	2018
Asia (Note: Includes Turkey)		58,167.7 (Note: only 7,206.7 km without China)	2,5620.3 (Note: only 6,563.91 km without China, includes Türkiye)	83,788 (Note: 13,770.61 km without China)	1.29	1.23	350	25 kV 50 or 60 Hz AC	1435 (Note: Exception: 1530 in Uzbekistan.)	1964
Europe (Note: Excluding Turkey which is counted in Asian section.)		18,445.6	7,612.9	26,058.5	1.71	2.42	320	Various (Note: 25 kV 50 Hz AC (most common, for most of lines electrified in recent years), 15 kV 16.7 Hz AC (second most common, especially in German-speaking and Scandinavian countries), 3 kV DC, 1.5 kV DC, diesel (especially in the UK))	1435 (Note: Exception: 1520 in Russia; 1524 in Finland; 1668 in Spain and Portugal)	1976
North America		735	656	1,391	0.06	0.28	260	Various (Note: 12.5 kV 60 Hz AC (New Haven–New York), 12 kV 25 Hz AC (New York–Washington), 25 kV 60 Hz AC (Boston–New Haven))	1435	1969
World		77,534.3	35,152	112,685.5	0.51	0.93		Various	1435	1964

==== Freight services ====
Country	Continent	Service	Type	Top speed (km/h)	Introduced	Status
Japan	Asia	JR freight service	Light freight	320	2019	Operational
Germany	Europe	IC:Kurier	Courrier	300	2020	Operational
China	Asia	Freight Express	Dedicated freight train	350	2020	Operational on busy routes
France	Europe	SNCF TGV La Poste	Dedicated freight train	270	1984	Defunct in 2015
Italy	Europe	Mercitalia Fast	Dedicated freight train	300	2018	Defunct in 2022

=== Networks under construction ===
Country/Region	Continent	Length (km)	Length approved (km)	Total (km)	Density (m/km^{2})	Length per 100,000 people (km)	Top speed (km/h)	Electrification	Track gauge (mm)	Work began	Opening
Estonia / Latvia / Lithuania (Rail Baltica)	Europe	870	0	870	4.97	14.82	234	25 kV 50 Hz	1435	2017	2028
Thailand	Asia	826.01	1,828	2,654.01	1.61	1.15	250	25 kV 50 Hz	1435	2017	2031
India	Asia	508.18 (Note: 7,700+ km with long-term plans by 2050s)	4,213.57	4,721.75	0.24	0.05	320	25 kV 50 Hz	1435	2021	2028
Algeria	Africa	285	0	285	0.12	0.62	220	25 kV 50 Hz	1435	2012	TBD
Egypt	Africa	230	1,770	2,000	0.23	0.2	250	25 kV 50 Hz	1435	2021	2027
United Arab Emirates / Oman (Etihad Rail)	Asia	150	153	303	0.38	0.89	350	None (Note: Etihad Rail will use Diesel electric multiple units)	1435	2025	2028

== Africa ==
=== Egypt ===
Line	Termini	Length	Type	Maximum speed	Opening	Status
Green Line	Mersa Matruh–Ain Sokhna	660 km (410 mi)	New	230 km/h (140 mph)	2027	Under construction
Blue Line	October Gardens - Abu Simbel	1,100 km (680 mi)	New	230 km/h (140 mph)	TBA	
Red Line	Qena - Hurghada	175 km (109 mi)	New	230 km/h (140 mph)	TBA	

=== Morocco ===
Line	Termini	Length	Type	Maximum speed	Opening	Status
Al Boraq	Tanger-Ville–Kenitra	186 km (116 mi)	New	320 km/h (200 mph)	2018	Operational
Al Boraq	Tanger-Ville–Casablanca	137 km (85 mi)	Upgraded	220 km/h (140 mph)	TBD (Note: no later than 2030)	Undergoing upgrade
Al Boraq	Kenitra–Rabat	55 km (34 mi)	New	320 km/h (200 mph)	2027	Under construction
Al Boraq	Kenitra-Marrakech	375 km (233 mi)	New	320 km/h (200 mph)	TBD (Note: no later than 2030)	Under construction
Al Boraq	Fez-Rabat	180 km (110 mi)	New	320 km/h (200 mph)	2030	Under construction

== Asia ==
=== China ===
High-speed rail lines of China

Line	Termini	Length	Type	Maximum speed	Opening	Status
Shanghai maglev train	Longyang Road–Pudong International	30.5 km (19.0 mi)	New (Maglev)	431 km/h (268 mph)	2004	Operational
Beijing–Shanghai	Beijing south–Tianjin West / Shanghai Hongqiao	1,318 km (819 mi)	New	350 km/h (220 mph)	2011	Operational
Beijing–Guangzhou (Note: Part of the greater Beijing-Hong Kong, Macau corridor.)	Beijing west–Guangzhou	2,230 km (1,390 mi)	New	350 km/h (220 mph)	2012	Operational
Hangzhou–Fuzhou–Shenzhen	Hangzhou east–Shenzhen north	1,495 km (929 mi)	New	350 km/h (220 mph)	2013	Operational
Huhanrong PDL	Shanghai Hongqiao–Chengdu	2,078 km (1,291 mi)	New	350 km/h (220 mph)	2014	Operational
Shanghai–Kunming	Shanghai Hongqiao–Kunming south	2,066 km (1,284 mi)	New	350 km/h (220 mph)	2016	Operational
Guangzhou–Kunming	Guangzhou south–Kunming south	1,285 km (798 mi)	New	350 km/h (220 mph)	2016	Operational
Suifenhe–Manzhouli	Suifenhe–Manzhouli	714 km (444 mi)	Upgraded	250 km/h (160 mph)	2018	Operational
Qingdao–Yinchuan	Qingdao north–Yinchuan	1,762 km (1,095 mi)	Upgraded	350 km/h (220 mph)	2018	Operational
Beijing–Lanzhou	Beijing–Lanzhou	1,526 km (948 mi)	Upgraded	350 km/h (220 mph)	2019	Operational
Beijing–Harbin	Beijing Chaoyang–Harbin / Dalian	1,700 km (1,100 mi)	New	350 km/h (220 mph)	2021	Operational
Eurasia Continental Bridge	Lianyungang–Ürümqi	3,422 km (2,126 mi)	New	350 km/h (220 mph)	2021	Operational
Coastal corridor (north extension) (Note: Part of the coastal corridor; consists of the Hangzhou-Fuzhou section which is already operational and is listed separately above)	Dandong–Ningbo	2,659 km (1,652 mi)	New	350 km/h (220 mph)	2027	Mostly operational (Note: Tianjin-Yantai and Nantong-Suzhou sections under construction)
Coastal corridor (south extension)	Huizhou south–Dongxing	954 km (593 mi)	New	350 km/h (220 mph)	2028	Mostly operational (Note: Guangzhou-Hepu section is under construction)
Hohhot–Nanning	Hohhot–Nanning	2,779.7 km (1,727.2 mi)	New	350 km/h (220 mph)	2028	Mostly operational (Note: 812 km under construction)
Baotou (Yinchuan)–Hainan (Note: Including Yinchuan-Xi'an line and Hainan Eastern and Western ring railway lines.)	Baotou–Sanya / Xi'an north	4,664 km (2,898 mi)	New	350 km/h (220 mph)	2028	Mostly operational (Note: 1,422 km is under construction; ~950 km is planned)
Lanzhou (Xining)–Guangzhou	Lanzhou west–Guangzhou	2,282 km (1,418 mi)	New	350 km/h (220 mph)	2028	Mostly operational (Note: 646 km is under construction)
Beijing–Hong Kong (Taipei)	Beijing Fengtai–Hong Kong West Kowloon / Taipei (Note: Proposed branch to Taipei crossing Taiwan Strait.)	4,392 km (2,729 mi)	New	350 km/h (220 mph)	2029	Mostly operational (Note: 690 km under planning; 409 km under construction)
Shanghai–Chongqing–Chengdu	Shanghai Baoshan–Chengdu	5,130 km (3,190 mi)	New	350 km/h (220 mph)	2029	Partly operational (Note: 2,965 km under construction)
Beijing–Kunming (Note: Including a branch line to Chongqinq.)	Beijing–Kunming / Chongqing	3,795.7 km (2,358.5 mi)	New	350 km/h (220 mph)	2030	Mostly operational (Note: Xiong'an-Xinzhou (340 km) and Chongqing-Kunming (698.98 km), totalling 1038.96 km is under construction)
Xiamen–Chongqing	Xiamen–Chongqing	937 km (582 mi)	New	350 km/h (220 mph)	TBD	Partly operational (Note: ~1,000 km under planning.)
Regional railways	Multiple lines	1,611 km (1,001 mi)	New	350 km/h (220 mph)	2008–2020	Operational
Intercity railways	Multiple lines	7,210 km (4,480 mi)	New	250 km/h (160 mph)	2008–2020	Operational
Class I railways	Multiple lines	5,056.9 km (3,142.2 mi)	Upgraded	200 km/h (120 mph)	2012–2019	Operational

=== India ===
Line	Termini	Length	Type	Maximum speed	Opening	Status
Mumbai–Ahmedabad	Mumbai BKC–Sabarmati	508.18 km (315.77 mi)	New	320 km/h (200 mph)	2027–2028	Under construction

=== Indonesia ===
Line	Termini	Length	Type	Maximum speed	Opening	Status
Whoosh high-speed railway	Halim (Jakarta)–Tegalluar (Bandung)	142.8 km (88.7 mi)	New	350 km/h (220 mph)	2023	Operational

=== Japan ===
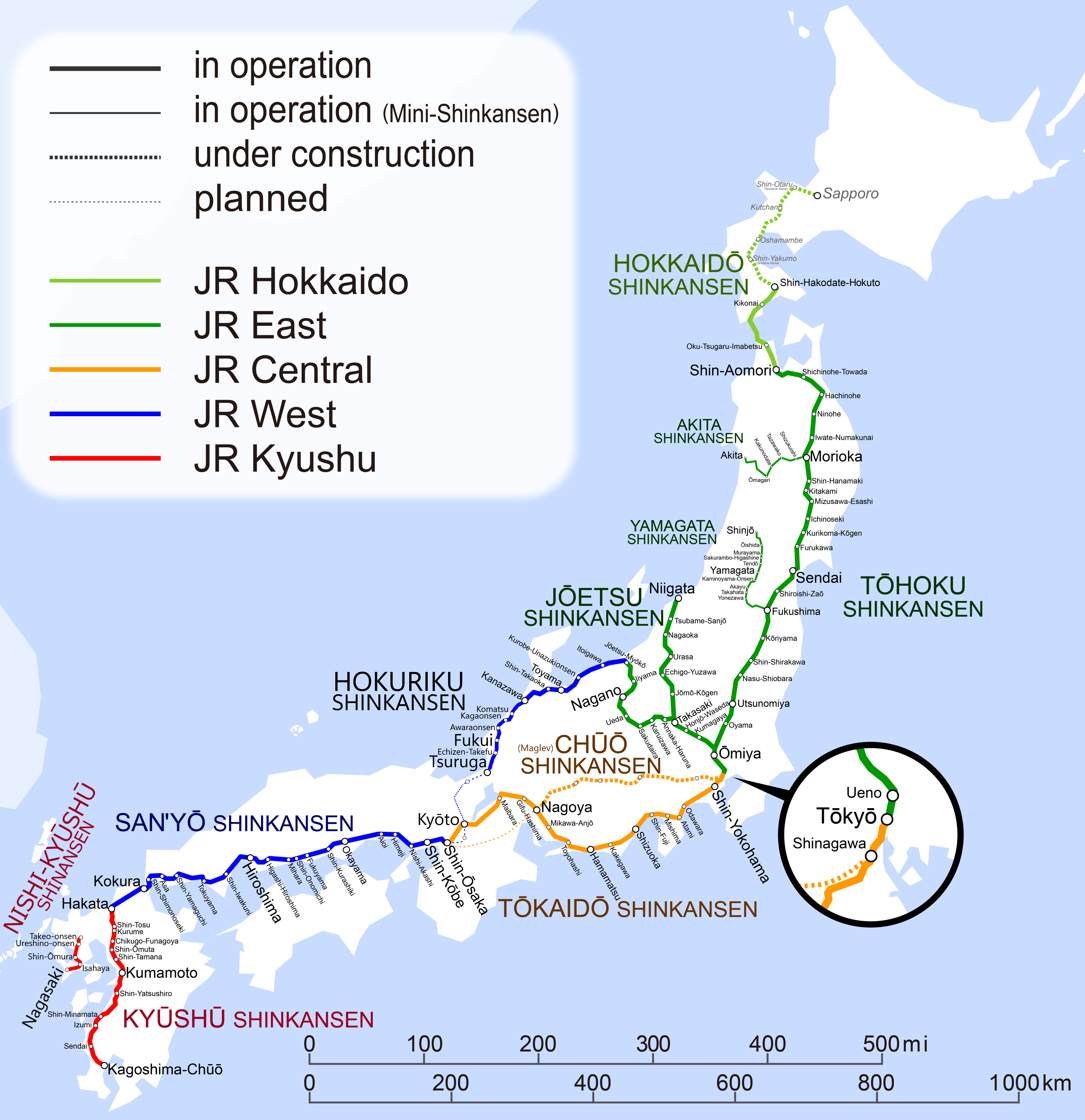
Map of Shinkansen lines (excluding the Hakata-Minami Line and Gala-Yuzawa Line extension)

Line	Termini	Length	Type	Maximum speed	Opening	Status
Tokaido Shinkansen	Tokyo–Shin-Osaka	515.4 km (320.3 mi)	New	285 km/h (177 mph)	1964	Operational
San'yō Shinkansen	Shin-Osaka–Hakata	553.7 km (344.1 mi)	New	300 km/h (190 mph)	1972–1975	Operational
Tōhoku Shinkansen	Tokyo–Shin-Aomori	674.9 km (419.4 mi)	New	320 km/h (200 mph)	1982–2010	Operational
Jōetsu Shinkansen	Tokyo–Niigata	269.5 km (167.5 mi)	New	275 km/h (171 mph)	1982	Operational
Hokuriku Shinkansen	Takasaki–Tsuruga	470.6 km (292.4 mi)	New	260 km/h (160 mph)	1997–2024	Operational
Kyushu Shinkansen	Hakata–Kagoshima-Chūō	256.8 km (159.6 mi)	New	260 km/h (160 mph)	2004–2011	Operational
Nishi Kyushu Shinkansen	Takeo-Onsen–Nagasaki	66 km (41 mi)	New	260 km/h (160 mph)	2022	Operational
Hokkaido Shinkansen	Shin-Aomori–Shin-Hakodate-Hokuto	148.8 km (92.5 mi)	New	260 km/h (160 mph)	2016	Operational
Hokkaido Shinkansen	Shin-Hakodate-Hokuto-Sapporo	212 km (132 mi)	New	320 km/h (200 mph)	2038	Under Construction
Chūō Shinkansen	Shinagawa (Tokyo)–Nagoya	285.6 km (177.5 mi)	New (Maglev)	505 km/h (314 mph) (Note: Max speed attained on record: 603 km/h)	2035+	Under construction

=== Saudi Arabia ===
Line	Termini	Length	Type	Maximum speed	Opening	Status
Haramain HSR	Mecca–Medina	453 km (281 mi)	New	300 km/h (186 mph)	2018	Operational
Saudi Landbridge Project	Jeddah–Riyadh	950 km (590 mi)	New	250 km/h (155 mph)	2030	Under construction

=== South Korea ===
Map of Korean high-speed lines

Line	Termini	Length	Type	Maximum speed	Opening	Status
Gyeongbu HSR	Seoul–Busan	417.4 km (259.4 mi)	New	305 km/h (190 mph)	2004–2015	Operational
Jeolla Line	Iksan–Yeosu Expo	180.4 km (112.1 mi)	Upgraded	230 km/h (140 mph)	2011	Operational
Honam HSR	Osong–Mokpo	249.2 km (154.8 mi)	New	305 km/h (190 mph)	2015	Operational
Suseo–Pyeongtaek HSR	Suseo–PyeongtaekJije	61.1 km (38.0 mi)	New	305 km/h (190 mph)	2016	Operational
Suseo–Pyeongtaek HSR	PyeongtaekJije–Osong	46.4 km (28.8 mi)	New	305 km/h (190 mph)	2028	Under construction
Gyeonggang Line	Seowonju–Gangneung	120.2 km (74.7 mi)	New	250 km/h (160 mph)	2017	Operational
Gyeonggang Line	Yeoju–Seowonju	22.1 km (13.7 mi)	New	250 km/h (160 mph)	2027	Under construction
Jungbunaeryuk Line	Bubal–Mungyeong	92.7 km (57.6 mi)	New	230 km/h (140 mph)	2021-2024	Operational
Jungbunaeryuk Line	Mungyeong–Gimcheon	70.1 km (43.6 mi)	Upgraded	250 km/h (160 mph)	2032	Approved
Jungang Line	Cheongnyangni–Moryang	185.4 km (115.2 mi) (Note: out of 331.3)	Partly new	250 km/h (160 mph)	2021–2024	Operational
Donghae Line	Taehwagang–Samcheok	242.3 km (150.6 mi)	Partly new	200 km/h (120 mph)	2025	Operational
Donghae Line	Samcheok–Gangneung	45.2 km (28.1 mi)	Upgraded	250 km/h (160 mph)	Unknown	Approved
Donghae Line	Gangneung–Jejin	111.7 km (69.4 mi)	New	250 km/h (160 mph)	2027	Under construction
Seohae Line	Seohwaseong–Hongseong	90 km (56 mi)	New	250 km/h (160 mph)	2026	Under construction
Janghang Line	Hongseong–Iksan	95.5 km (59.3 mi)	Upgraded	250 km/h (160 mph)	2027	Undergoing upgrade
Gyeongjeon Line	Bujeon–Suncheon	165.8 km (103.0 mi)	Upgraded	230 km/h (140 mph)	2025	Undergoing upgrade
Gyeongjeon Line	Imseong-ri–Boseong	82.5 km (51.3 mi)	Upgraded	200 km/h (120 mph)	2025	Undergoing upgrade
Gyeongjeon Line	Suncheon–GwangjuSongjeong	121.5 km (75.5 mi)	Upgraded	250 km/h (160 mph)	2030	Undergoing upgrade
Chuncheon-Sokcho Line	Chuncheon–Sokcho	93.7 km (58.2 mi)	New	250 km/h (160 mph)	2027	Under construction
Nambunaeryuk Line	Gimcheon–Geoje	177.9 km (110.5 mi)	New	250 km/h (160 mph)	2030	Under construction
Chungbuk Line	Osong–Bongyang	115 km (71 mi)	Upgraded	250 km/h (160 mph)	2031	Undergoing upgrade

=== Taiwan ===
Line	Termini	Length	Type	Maximum speed	Opening	Status
Taiwan HSR	Nangang–Zuoying	351 km (218 mi) (Note: 5.2 extra added in 2016)	New	300 km/h (190 mph)	2007-2016 (Note: Nangang station)	Operational
Taiwan HSR	Taipei–Yilan	56.4 km (35.0 mi)	New	300 km/h (190 mph)	2036	Approved

=== Thailand ===
Line	Termini	Length	Type	Maximum speed	Opening	Status
Northeastern HSR	Krung Thep Aphiwat Central–Nakhon Ratchasima–Nong Khai	606.01 km (376.56 mi)	New	250 km/h (160 mph)	2031 (Note: Bangkok–Nakhon Ratchasima)	Under construction
Eastern HSR	Don Mueang–U-Tapao	220 km (140 mi)	New	250 km/h (160 mph)	2029	Under construction

=== Turkey ===
Line	Termini	Length	Type	Maximum speed	Opening	Status
Polatlı–Konya	Polatlı–Konya	212 km (132 mi)	New	250 km/h (155 mph)	2011	Operational
Ankara–Istanbul	Sincan–Köseköy	313 km (194 mi)	Upgraded	250 km/h (155 mph)	2014	Operational
Ankara–Istanbul	Other sections	20 km (12 mi)	New	250 km/h (155 mph)	2028	Under construction
Konya–Yenice railway	Konya–Karaman	102 km (63 mi)	Upgraded	200 km/h (125 mph)	2021	Operational
Konya–Yenice railway	Karaman–Ulukışla	135 km (84 mi)	Upgraded	200 km/h (125 mph)	2026	Under construction
Ankara–Sivas	Kayaş–Sivas	394 km (245 mi)	New	250 km/h (155 mph)	2023	Operational
Bandırma–Bursa–Osmaneli line (in Turkish)	Bandırma–Bursa–Osmaneli	201 km (125 mi)	New	200 km/h (125 mph)	2025–2028	Under construction
Istanbul–Kapıkule railway	Halkalı–Kapıkule	229 km (142 mi)	Upgraded	200 km/h (125 mph)	2025–2028	Under construction
Mersin–Adana–Gaziantep railway	Mersin–Gaziantep	311 km (193 mi)	Upgraded	200 km/h (125 mph)	2027	Under construction
Polatlı–İzmir	Polatlı–Alsancak	505 km (314 mi)	New	250 km/h (155 mph)	2027	Under construction
Yerköy–Kayseri railway (in Turkish)	Yerköy–Kayseri	142 km (88 mi)	New	250 km/h (155 mph)	2028	Under construction
Kırıkkale–Çorum–Samsun	Kırıkkale Delice–Samsun	293 km (182 mi)	New	250 km/h (155 mph)	2028	Under construction
Sivas-Zara line (in Turkish)	Sivas-Zara	74 km (46 mi)	New	250 km/h (155 mph)	2028	Under construction

=== Uzbekistan ===
Line	Termini	Length	Type	Maximum speed	Opening	Status
Tashkent–Bukhara	Tashkent–Bukhara	600 km (370 mi)	New	250 km/h (160 mph)	2011	Operational
Bhukhara–Khiva	Bukhara-Khiva	465 km (289 mi)	New	250 km/h (160 mph)	2030	Under Construction

== Europe ==
=== Austria ===
Line	Termini	Length	Type	Maximum speed	Opening	Status
Western Railway	Vienna–Salzburg	243 km (151 mi) (Note: out of 312.2 total)	Upgraded	230 km/h (143 mph)	1990–2018	Operational
New Lower Inn Valley Railway	Kundl–Baumkirchen	40.2 km (25.0 mi)	New	220 km/h (140 mph)	2012	Operational
New Lower Inn Valley Railway	Brannenburg-Kundl	25 km (16 mi)	New	250 km/h (155 mph)	TBD	Under construction
Koralm Railway	Graz–Klagenfurt	127 km (79 mi)	New	250 km/h (155 mph)	2025	Operational
Marchegger eastern railway	Vienna–Slovak border	38 km (24 mi)	Upgraded	200 km/h (125 mph)	2025	Operational
Pottendorfer Line	Vienna–Wiener Neustadt	47 km (29 mi)	Upgraded	200 km/h (125 mph)	2029	Undergoing upgrade
Semmering Base Tunnel	Gloggnitz–Mürzzuschlag	27.3 km (17.0 mi)	New	230 km/h (143 mph)	2030	Under construction
North railway line	Gänserndorf–Břeclav	47 km (29 mi)	Upgraded	200 km/h (125 mph)	2030	Undergoing upgrade
Brenner Base Tunnel	Innsbruck–Italy border	46 km (29 mi)	New	250 km/h (155 mph)	2032	Under construction

=== Baltic States (Estonia, Latvia and Lithuania) ===
Line	Termini	Length	Type	Maximum speed	Opening	Status
Rail Baltica	Tallinn–Vilnius	870 km (540 mi)	New	234 km/h (145 mph)	2028 (Note: Tallinn-Pärnu)–2030 (Note: Lithuanian section)–2032 (Note: Latvian section)	Under construction

=== Belgium ===
Line	Termini	Length	Type	Maximum speed	Opening	Status
HSL 1	LGV Nord–Bruxelles-Sud	88 km (55 mi)	New	300 km/h (186 mph)	1997	Operational
HSL 2+line 36N	Leuven–Liège-Guillemins	66 km (41 mi)	New	300 km/h (186 mph)	2002	Operational
HSL 2+line 36N	Leuven–Bruxelles-Nord	28.8 km (17.9 mi)	Partly new	200 km/h (125 mph)	2003–2006	Operational
HSL 3	Liège-Guillemins–Cologne-Aachen	42 km (26 mi)	New	260 km/h (160 mph)	2009	Operational
HSL 4	Antwerpen-Centraal–HSL Zuid	36 km (22 mi)	New	300 km/h (186 mph)	2009	Operational
Belgian railway line 50A	Brussels–Denderleeuw; Gent–Brugge	57.9 km (36.0 mi)	Upgraded	200 km/h (125 mph)	TBD	Undergoing upgrade
Diabolo project	N/A (connecting line)	3 km (1.9 mi)	Upgraded	200 km/h (125 mph)	TBD	Undergoing upgrade

=== Czech Republic ===
Line	Termini	Length	Type	Maximum speed	Opening	Status
Line 001	Prague-Poříčany	30 km (19 mi)	Upgraded	200 km/h (125 mph)	TBD	Undergoing upgrade
Line 001	Přerov – Ostrava	25.594 km (15.903 mi)	Upgraded	200 km/h (125 mph)	TBD	Undergoing upgrade
Line 002	Brno-Vranovice	83.796 km (52.068 mi)	Upgraded	200 km/h (125 mph)	TBD	Undergoing upgrade
Line 004 Prague-Ceske Budejovice	Votice-Sudoměřice u Tábora	21.514 km (13.368 mi)	Upgraded	200 km/h (125 mph)	2025	Operational
Line 004 Prague-Ceske Budejovice	Doubí u Tábora-Soběslav	8.714 km (5.415 mi)	Upgraded	200 km/h (125 mph)	2025	Operational

=== Denmark ===
Line	Termini	Length	Type	Maximum speed	Opening	Status
Øresund Line	Copenhagen Central–Swedish border	10 km (6.2 mi) (Note: Danish side)	New	200 km/h (125 mph)	2000	Operational
Copenhagen–Ringsted Line	Copenhagen central–Ringsted	60 km (37 mi)	New	200 km/h (125 mph)	2019	Operational
Copenhagen–Fredericia/Taulov Line	Ringsted–Odense	96.4 km (59.9 mi)	New	200 km/h (125 mph)	2029	Undergoing upgrade
Fehmarn Belt fixed link	Ringsted–Rødby	8.3 km (5.2 mi)	New	200 km/h (125 mph)	2028	Under construction
Vestfyn Line	Odense–Middelfart	35 km (22 mi)	New	250 km/h (155 mph)	2028	Under construction

=== Finland ===
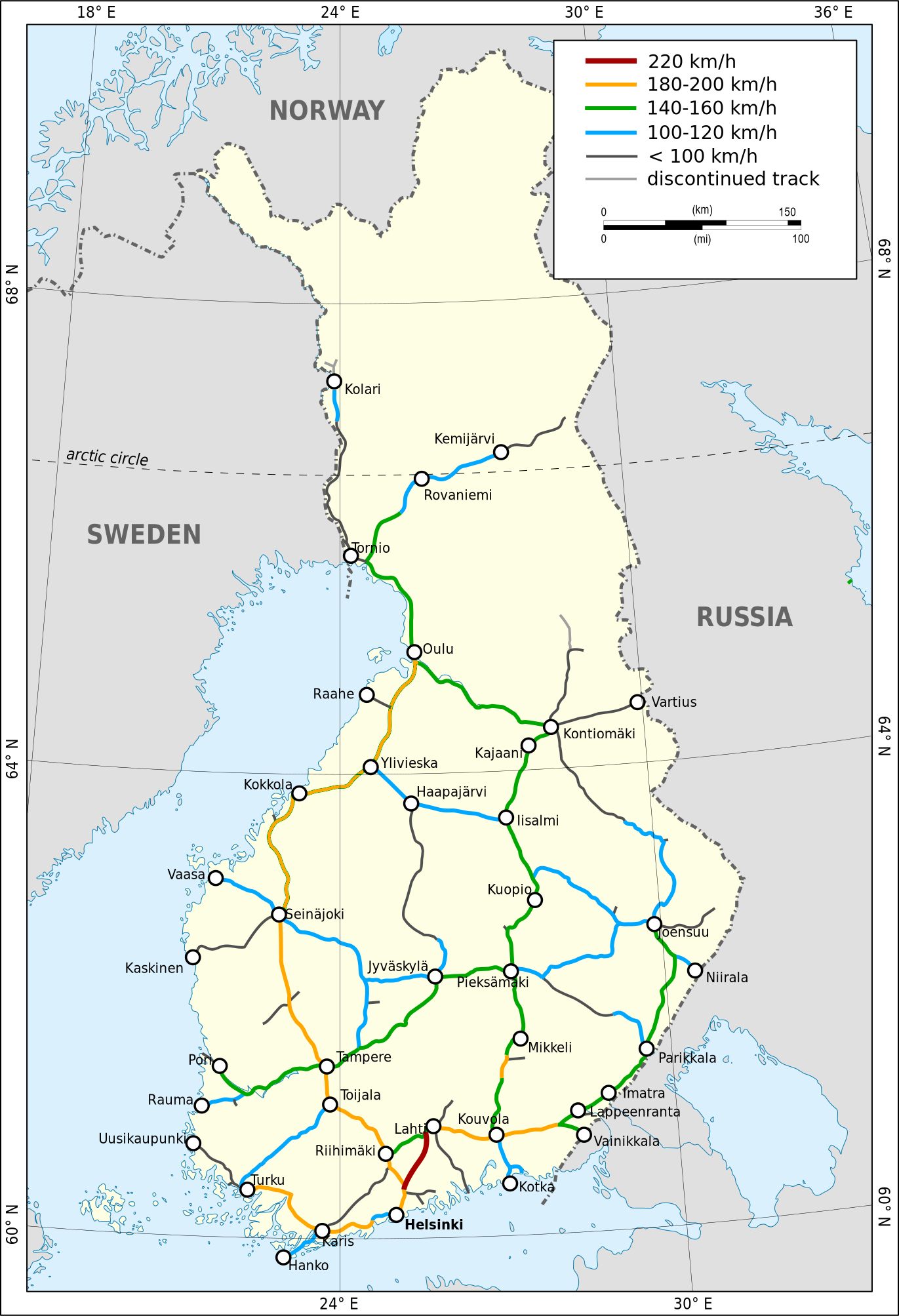
Running speeds on the Finnish railway network.

Line	Termini	Length	Type	Maximum speed	Opening	Status
Kerava–Lahti railway	Kerava–Lahti	75.7 km (47.0 mi)	New	220 km/h (140 mph)	2006	Operational
Rantarata	Helsinki central–Turku Harbour	63 km (39 mi) (Note: Karis – Paimio stretch, out of 195.8 km total)	Upgraded	200 km/h (125 mph)	1995	Operational
Helsinki–Riihimäki Railway	Helsinki central–Riihimäki	71.4 km (44.4 mi)	Upgraded	200 km/h (125 mph)	1995	Operational
Riihimäki–Tampere railway	Riihimäki–Tampere	116 km (72 mi)	Upgraded	200 km/h (125 mph)	1995	Operational
Tampere–Seinäjoki railway	Lielax–Seinäjoki	156 km (97 mi)	Upgraded	200 km/h (125 mph)	2008	Operational
Oulu Main Line	Seinäjoki–Lapua	23 km (14 mi)	Upgraded	200 km/h (125 mph)	2017	Operational
Oulu Main Line	Lapua–Kokkola	110 km (68 mi)	Upgraded	200 km/h (125 mph)	2011	Operational
Oulu Main Line	Kokkola–Ylivieska	79 km (49 mi)	Upgraded	200 km/h (125 mph)	2018	Operational
Oulu Main Line	Ylivieska–Liminka	123 km (76 mi)	Upgraded	200 km/h (125 mph)	2015	Operational
Savonia railway	Kinni-Otava	45 km (28 mi) (Note: out of 357.8 km total)	Upgraded	200 km/h (125 mph)	2006	Operational
Riihimäki–Saint Petersburg railway	Riihimäki–Russian border	120 km (75 mi) (Note: out of 188 km total)	Upgraded	200 km/h (125 mph)	2010 (Note: Lahti-Luumäki)-2013 (Note: Luumäki-Vainikkala)	Operational
Helsinki–Turku high-speed railway	?	?	New?	300 km/h (186 mph)	2031	Approved

=== France ===
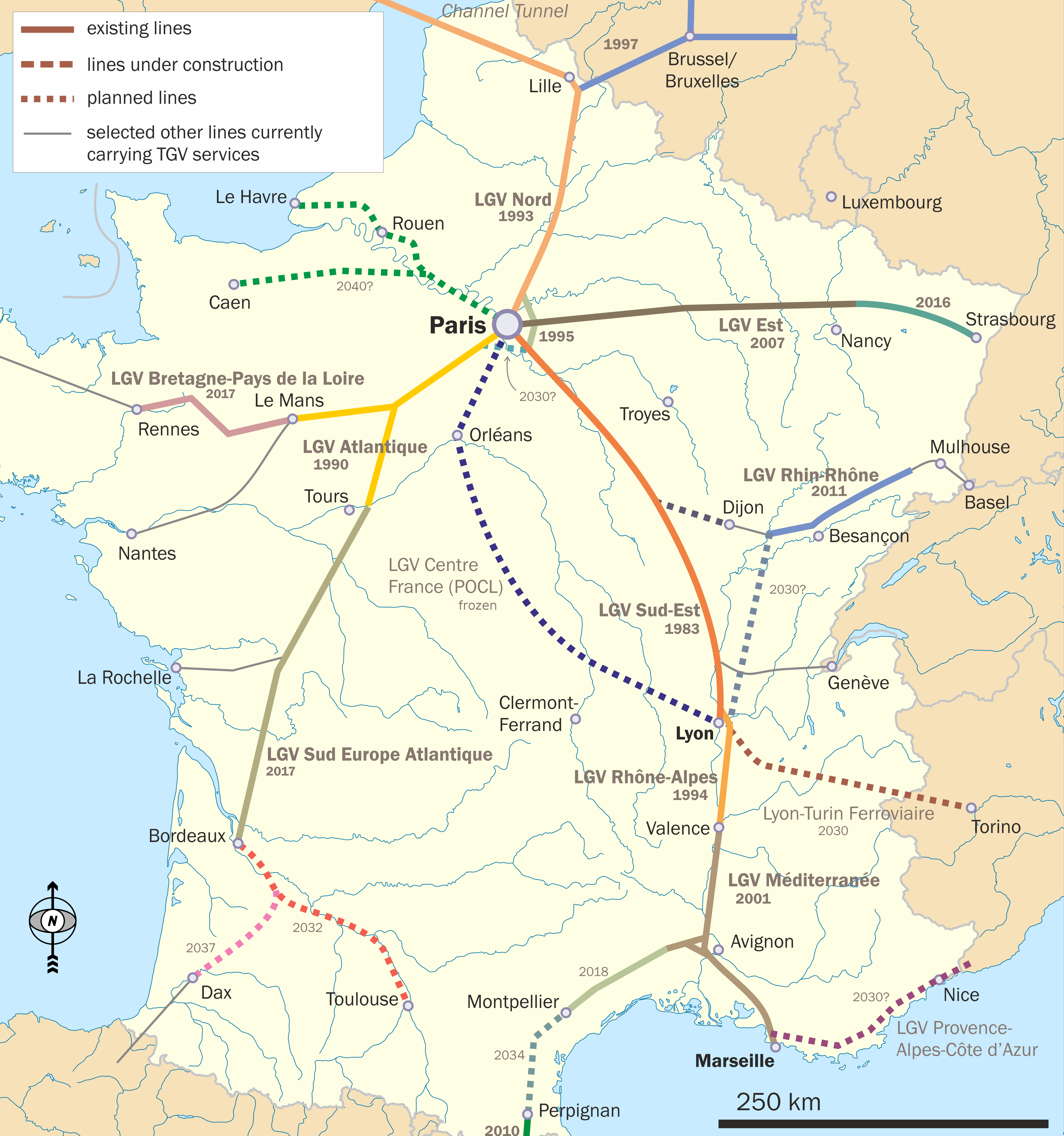
Overview of French TGV lines

Line	Termini	Length	Type	Maximum speed	Opening	Status
Orléans–Montauban railway	Orléans–Vierzon	70.399 km (43.744 mi)	Upgraded	200 km/h (125 mph)	1967 (Note: Le Capitole service before 1990s, TGV since 1990s)	Operational
Paris–Bordeaux railway	Paris-Austerlitz–Bordeaux-Saint-Jean	331.08 km (205.72 mi)	Upgraded	220 km/h (140 mph)	1973	Operational
LGV Sud-Est	Paris Gare de Lyon, Paris–Gare de la Part-Dieu, Lyon	409 km (254 mi)	New	300 km/h (186 mph)	1981 (Note: south)-1983 (Note: north)	Operational
LGV Atlantique	Gare Montparnasse, Paris–Le Mans/Tours	284 km (176 mi)	New	300 km/h (186 mph)	1989	Operational
Mantes-la-Jolie–Cherbourg railway	Mantes–Cherbourg	85.267 km (52.982 mi)	Upgraded	200 km/h (125 mph)	1989	Operational
Paris–Brest railway	Paris-Montparnasse–Brest	47.8 km (29.7 mi) (Note: out of 622 km total)	Upgraded	220 km/h (140 mph)	1989 (Note: TGV 1989-2017, Ouigo after 2017)	Operational
Strasbourg–Basel railway	Strasbourg–Basel (Note: triple border between France, Germany and Switzerland)	141.3 km (87.8 mi)	Upgraded	220 km/h (140 mph)	1990	Operational
Le Mans–Angers railway	Le Mans–Angers-Saint-Laud	73.8 km (45.9 mi)	Upgraded	220 km/h (140 mph)	Unknown	Operational
Tours–Saint-Nazaire railway	Tours–Nantes	80.6 km (50.1 mi)	Upgraded	220 km/h (140 mph)	Unknown	Operational
Savenay–Landerneau railway	Savenay–Quimper	42 km (26 mi)	Upgraded	220 km/h (140 mph)	Unknown (Note: no earlier than 1992 when electrified)	Operational
LGV Rhône-Alpes	Lyon-Saint-Exupéry–Valence	115 km (71 mi)	New	300 km/h (186 mph)	1992	Operational
LGV Nord	Channel Tunnel–Gare du Nord, Paris	333 km (207 mi)	New	300 km/h (186 mph)	1993	Operational
LGV Interconnexion Est	Aéroport Charles de Gaulle, Paris–Marne-la-Vallée–Chessy, Paris	90 km (56 mi)	New	270 km/h (170 mph)	1994	Operational
LGV Méditerranée	Avignon–Marseille-Saint-Charles	216 km (134 mi)	New	320 km/h (200 mph)	2001	Operational
LGV Est	Gare de l'Est, Paris–Lorraine, Louvigny	406 km (252 mi)	New	320 km/h (200 mph)	2007 (Note: first 300 km)–2016 (Note: rest 106 km)	Operational
LGV Rhin-Rhône	Besançon Franche-Comté, Les Auxons–Belfort – Montbéliard, Paris	140 km (87 mi)	New	320 km/h (200 mph)	2011	Operational
Perpignan–Barcelona HSR	Montpellier Sud–Perthus Tunnel	17.1 km (10.6 mi)	New	300 km/h (186 mph)	2013	Operational
LGV Sud Europe Atlantique	Poitiers–Bordeaux-Saint-Jean	340 km (210 mi)	New	320 km/h (200 mph)	2017	Operational
LGV Bretagne-Pays de la Loire	Sablé-sur-Sarthe–Rennes	214 km (133 mi)	New	320 km/h (200 mph)	2017	Operational
Contournement Nîmes – Montpellier	Nîmes-Pont-du-Gard–Montpellier Sud	80 km (50 mi)	New	220 km/h (140 mph)	2018	Operational
Lyon–Turin HSR	Lyon-Saint-Exupéry–Mont d'Ambin Base Tunnel	150 km (93 mi)	New	220 km/h (140 mph)	2032	Under construction
LGV Bordeaux–Toulouse	Bordeaux-Saint-Jean–Toulouse	222 km (138 mi)	New	320 km/h (200 mph)	2032	Under construction
LGV Montpellier–Perpignan	Montpellier–Perpignan	150 km (93 mi)	New?	350 km/h (220 mph)	2034–2044	Approved

=== Germany ===
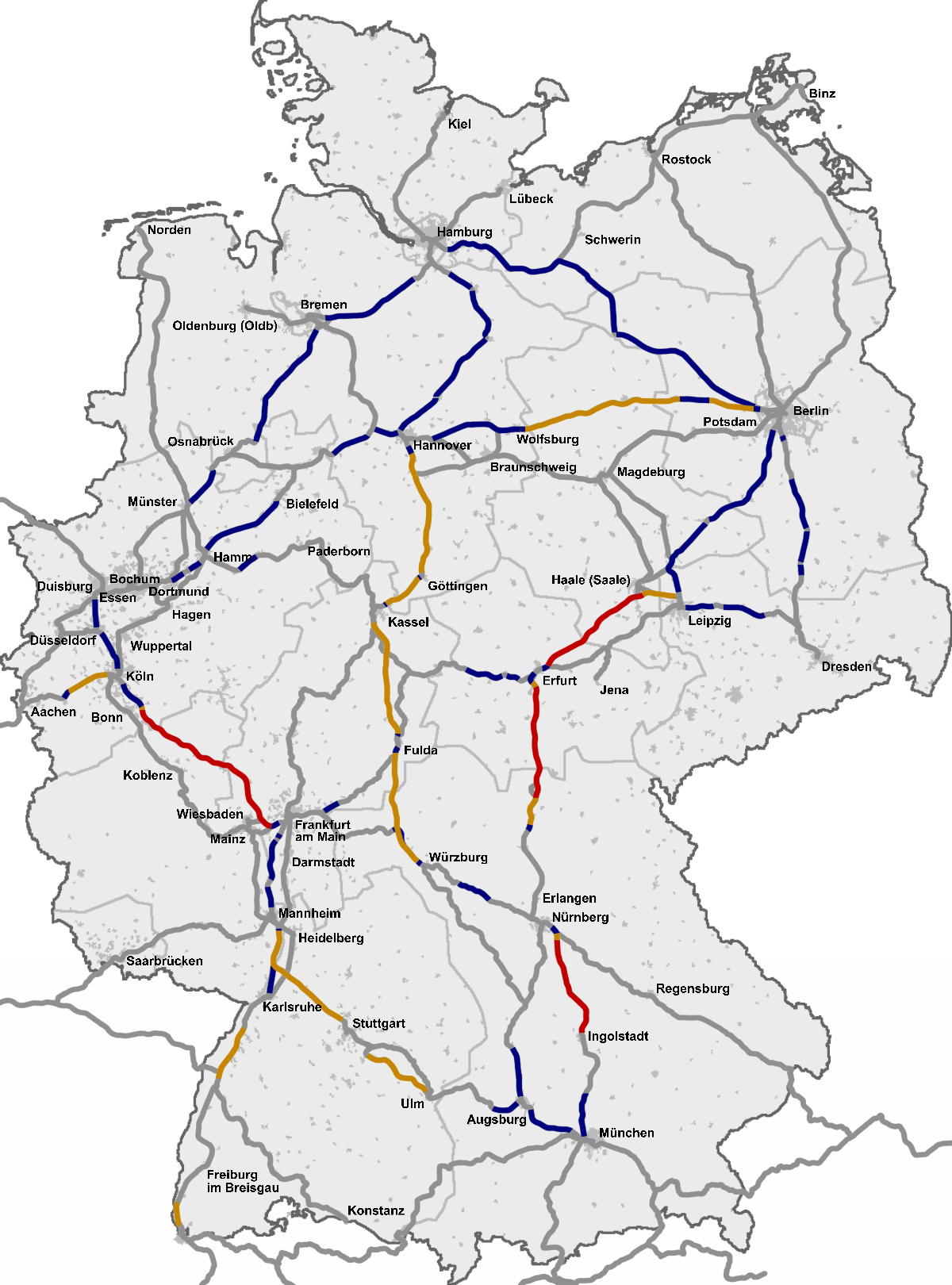
The InterCityExpress (ICE) network map in Germany (maximum speed limit): New lines, 300 km/h (186 mph) New and upgraded lines, 250–280 km/h (155–174 mph) Upgraded lines, 200–230 km/h (125–143 mph) Conventional lines (selected), 160 km/h (100 mph)

Line	Termini	Length	Type	Maximum speed	Opening	Status
Berlin–Hamburg Railway	Berlin–Hamburg	284.1 km (176.5 mi)	Upgraded	230 km/h (143 mph)	1931	Operational
Wanne-Eickel–Hamburg railway	Hamburg–Wanne-Eickel	134.7 km (83.7 mi) (Note: out of 355 km total)	Upgraded	200 km/h (125 mph)	1980s	Operational
Augsburg–Nördlingen railway	Augsburg-Donauwörth	36.5 km (22.7 mi)	Upgraded	200 km/h (125 mph)	1978-1981	Operational
Cologne–Duisburg railway	Cologne–Duisburg	64 km (40 mi)	Upgraded	200 km/h (125 mph)	1980s	Operational
Hamm–Minden railway	Hamm–Bitterfeld	58 km (36 mi) (Note: out of 112 km total)	Upgraded	200 km/h (125 mph)	1980	Operational
Nantenbach Curve	Antenbach junction– Rohrbach	11.3 km (7.0 mi)	Upgraded	200 km/h (125 mph)	1994	Operational
Hanover–Minden railway	Hannover–Minden	36.5 km (22.7 mi) (Note: out of 64.4 km total)	Upgraded	200 km/h (125 mph)	1984	Operational
Dortmund–Hamm railway	Dortmund–Hamm	26.7 km (16.6 mi) (Note: out of 31 km total)	Upgraded	200 km/h (125 mph)	1986	Operational
Hanover–Hamburg railway	Hannover–Hamburg	133.2 km (82.8 mi) (Note: out of 155 km total)	Upgraded	200 km/h (125 mph)	1987	Operational
Waghäusel Saalbach–Graben-Neudorf railway	NA (Connecting link)	7.94 km (4.93 mi)	Upgraded	200 km/h (125 mph)	1988	Operational
Hanover–Würzburg	Hanover–Würzburg	327 km (203 mi)	New	250 km/h (155 mph) (Note: 280 km/h if delayed.)	1991	Operational
Mannheim–Stuttgart	Mannheim–Stuttgart	99 km (62 mi)	New	250 km/h (155 mph) (Note: 280 km/h if delayed; 300 km/h upgradable)	1991	Operational
Rhine Railway	Mannheim–Rastatt	88.9 km (55.2 mi)	Upgraded	200 km/h (125 mph)	1991	Operational
Ulm–Augsburg railway (old line)	Augsburg-Oberhausen–Dinkelscherben	25.8 km (16.0 mi)	Upgraded	200 km/h (125 mph)	1992	Operational
Frankfurt–Göttingen railway	Hanau–Hailer-Meerholz	19 km (12 mi) (Note: out of 240 km total)	Upgraded	200 km/h (125 mph) (Note: 230 km/h after 2025 planned)	1993	Operational
Hanover–Berlin	Hannover–Berlin	258 km (160 mi)	New	280 km/h (170 mph) (Note: most of the line - 250 km/h; 300 km/h upgradable)	1998	Operational
Nuremberg–Würzburg railway	Aisch–Iphofen	28.8 km (17.9 mi)	Upgraded	200 km/h (125 mph)	1999	Operational
Mannheim–Frankfurt railway	Mannheim–Frankfurt	74.8 km (46.5 mi)	Upgraded	200 km/h (125 mph)	1999	Operational
Cologne–Frankfurt	Cologne–Frankfurt	180 km (110 mi)	New	300 km/h (186 mph)	2002	Operational
Cologne–Aachen	Cologne–Düren	39.2 km (24.4 mi)	Upgraded	250 km/h (155 mph)	2002	Operational
Cologne–Aachen	Düren-Eschweiler Hbf	17.7 km (11.0 mi)	Upgraded	200 km/h (125 mph)	2030	Undergoing upgrade
Berlin–Halle railway	Berlin–Halle	161.6 km (100.4 mi)	Upgraded	200 km/h (125 mph)	2006	Operational
Trebnitz–Leipzig railway	Rackwitz–Bitterfeld	21.5 km (13.4 mi)	Upgraded	200 km/h (125 mph)	2006	Operational
Nuremberg–Ingolstadt	Nuremberg–Ingolstadt	77.5 km (48.2 mi)	New	300 km/h (186 mph)	2006–2013	Operational
Hamm–Warburg railway	Hamm–Paderborn	77.7 km (48.3 mi)	Upgraded	200 km/h (125 mph)	2007	Operational
Munich–Augsburg railway	Munich–Augsburg	61.9 km (38.5 mi)	Upgraded	230 km/h (143 mph)	2011 (Note: partly opened in 1969)	Operational
Leipzig–Dresden railway	Leipzig–Riesa	60 km (37 mi) (Note: out of 116 km total)	Upgraded	200 km/h (125 mph)	2014	Operational
Leipzig–Dresden railway	Dresden–Riesa	54 km (34 mi) (Note: out of 116 km total)	Upgraded	200 km/h (125 mph)	2030	Undergoing upgrade
Erfurt–Leipzig/Halle	Erfurt–Leipzig/Halle	123 km (76 mi)	New	300 km/h (186 mph)	2015	Operational
Nuremberg–Erfurt	Ebensfeld–Erfurt	107 km (66 mi)	New	300 km/h (186 mph)	2017	Operational
Nuremberg–Erfurt	Ebensfeld–Eltersdorf	83 km (52 mi)	Upgraded	230 km/h (143 mph)	2030	Undergoing upgrade
Wendlingen–Ulm	Wendlingen–Ulm	59.5 km (37.0 mi)	New	250 km/h (155 mph)	2022	Operational
Stuttgart–Wendlingen	Stuttgart–Wendlingen	25 km (16 mi)	New	250 km/h (155 mph)	2026	Under construction
Mannheim–Saarbrücken railway	St. Ingbert–Ludwigshafen	82 km (51 mi)	Upgraded	200 km/h (125 mph)	2028	Undergoing upgrade
Lübeck–Puttgarden railway	Lübeck–Puttgarden	88.6 km (55.1 mi)	Partly new	200 km/h (125 mph)	2030	Undergoing upgrade
Berlin–Dresden railway	Berlin Südkreuz–Dresden HBF	174.2 km (108.2 mi)	Upgraded	230 km/h (143 mph)	2030	Undergoing upgrade
Karlsruhe–Basel	Karlsruhe–Basel	182 km (113 mi)	New	250 km/h (155 mph)	2031	Under construction
*Brenner-Nordzulauf (Brenner North Approach)	Osterseeon–Austrian border	40 km (25 mi)	New	230 km/h (145 mph)	2039	Under construction

=== Greece ===
Line	Termini	Length	Type	Maximum speed	Opening	Status
P.A.Th.E./P.	Bulgarian border (Note: planned)–Thessaloniki–Larissa–Athens–Corinth–Patras	160 km (99 mi) (Note: out of 600+ km total)	Partly new	200 km/h (125 mph)	2022	Mostly operational

=== Italy ===
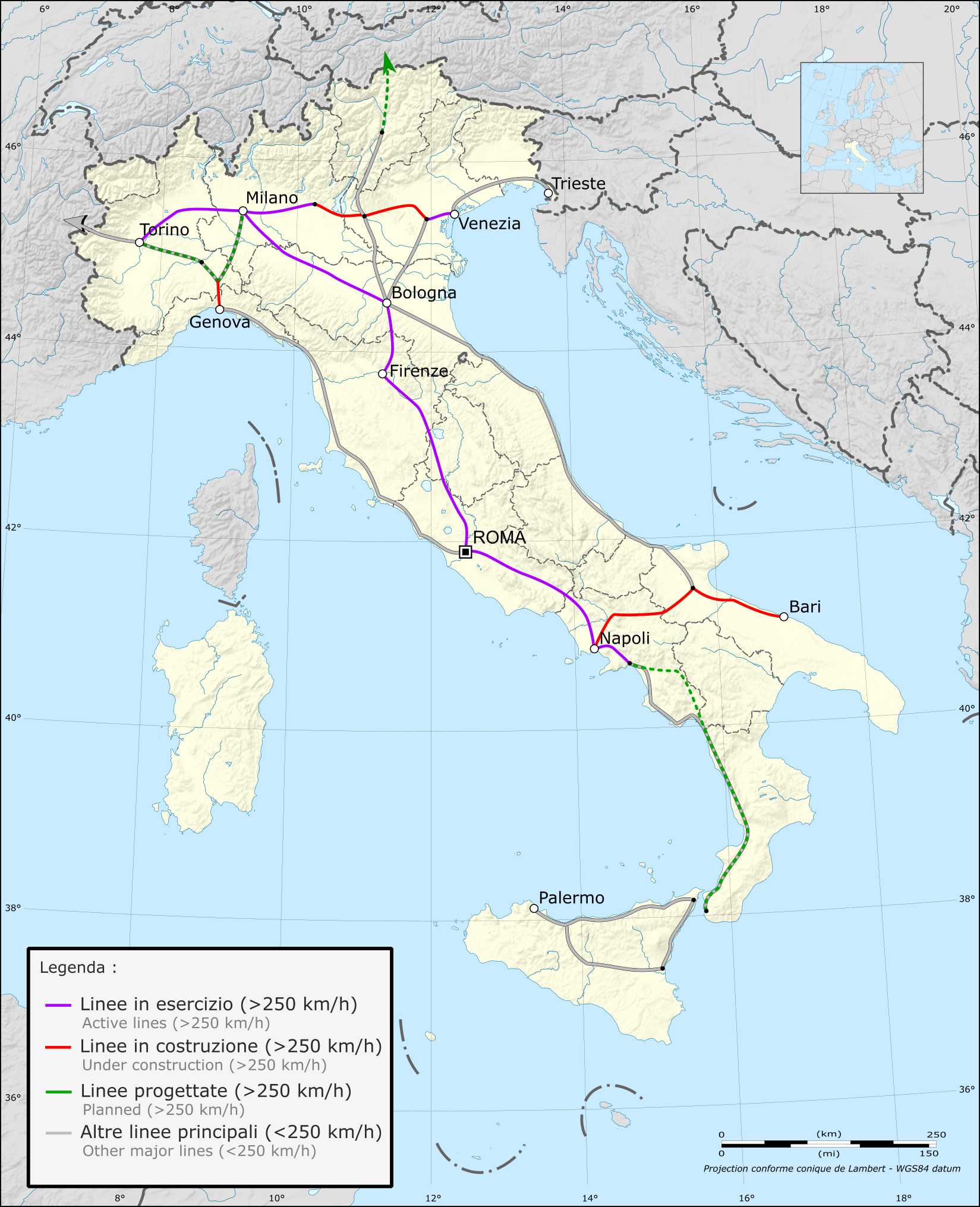
Map of Italian high-speed and higher speed rail network

Line	Termini	Length	Type	Maximum speed	Opening	Status
Florence–Rome	Firenze Santa Maria Novella, Florence–Roma Termini	254 km (158 mi)	New	250 km/h (155 mph)	1992	Operational
Turin–Milan	Torino Porta Susa, Turin–Milano Centrale	148.3 km (92.1 mi)	New	300 km/h (186 mph)	2006	Operational
Milan–Venice railway	Padua–Venice	25 km (16 mi) (Note: out of 267 km total)	Upgraded	220 km/h (140 mph)	2007	Operational
Milan–Venice railway	Treviglio-Brescia	39.6 km (24.6 mi) (Note: out of 267 km total)	New	250 km/h (155 mph)	2016	Operational
Milan–Venice railway	Brescia - Verona	45.4 km (28.2 mi)	New	250 km/h (155 mph)	2026	Under construction
Milan–Venice railway	Verona-Padua	80 km (50 mi)	New	250 km/h (155 mph)	2029-2032	Under construction
Milan–Bologna	Milano Centrale–Bologna Centrale	214.6 km (133.3 mi)	New	300 km/h (186 mph)	2008	Operational
Naples–Salerno	Napoli Afragola–Salerno	29 km (18 mi)	New	250 km/h (155 mph)	2008	Operational
Verona–Bologna railway	Verona–Bologna Centrale	115 km (71 mi)	Upgraded	200 km/h (125 mph)	2009	Operational
Rome–Naples	Roma Termini–Napoli Centrale	204.6 km (127.1 mi)	New	300 km/h (186 mph)	2009	Operational
Bologna–Ancona railway	Bologna–Ancona	153 km (95 mi) (Note: out of 204 km total)	Upgraded	200 km/h (125 mph)	2015	Operational
Adriatic railway	Brindisi–Lecce	38.364 km (23.838 mi)	Upgraded	200 km/h (125 mph)	2018	Operational
Adriatic railway	Pescara–Termoli	89.468 km (55.593 mi)	Upgraded	200 km/h (125 mph)	2026	Undergoing upgrade
Pisa–Rome railway	Cecina–Castagneto Carducci-Donoratico; Orbetello–Follonica	91 km (57 mi)	Upgraded	200 km/h (125 mph)	?	Operational
Milan–Verona	Milano Lambrate–Verona Porta Nuova	165 km (103 mi)	New	300 km/h (186 mph)	2023	Partly operational (Note: 67 km of the section is operational while the rest of it is under construction.)
Tortona–Genoa	Genoa–Tortona	53 km (33 mi)	New	250 km/h (155 mph)	2026	Under construction
Naples–Bari	Naples–Bari	147 km (91 mi)	New	250 km/h (155 mph)	2027	Under construction
Salerno–Reggio di Calabria railway	Battipaglia–Romagnano	35 km (22 mi)	Partly new	300 km/h (186 mph)	2030	Under construction
Alessandria–Piacenza railway	Tortona–Voghera	16 km (9.9 mi) (Note: out of 96 km total)	Upgraded	200 km/h (125 mph)	2026	Undergoing upgrade
Palermo–Catania–Messina high-speed railway	Palermo–Catania–Messina	67 km (42 mi)	New	250 km/h (155 mph)	2029	Under construction
Genoa–Ventimiglia railway	Andora–Finale Ligure	32 km (20 mi)	Upgraded	200 km/h (125 mph)	2030	Undergoing upgrade
Brenner Base Tunnel+Verona-Brenner railway	Austrian border–Tunnel's south portal–Verona	198 km (123 mi)	Partly new	250 km/h (155 mph)	2032	Under construction
Turin–Lyon high-speed railway	Turin–French border	57 km (35 mi)	New	220 km/h (140 mph)	2032	Under construction
Venice–Trieste railway	Venice–Trieste	153 km (95 mi)	Upgraded	200 km/h (125 mph)	TBD	Undergoing upgrade
Ionian Railway	Taranto-Metaponto	43.2 km (26.8 mi)	Upgraded	200 km/h (125 mph)	TBD	Undergoing upgrade

=== Netherlands ===
Line	Termini	Length	Type	Maximum speed	Opening	Status
HSL-Zuid	Amsterdam Centraal–Belgian border	125 km (78 mi)	New	300 km/h (186 mph)	2009	Operational
Lelystad–Zwolle railway	Lelystad Centrum–Zwolle	50 km (31 mi)	New	200 km/h (125 mph) (Note: Line is 200 km/h ready but as of 2024, there are no trainsets operating beyond 140-160 km/h on this route.)	2012	Operational

=== Norway ===
Line	Termini	Length	Type	Maximum speed	Opening	Status
Gardermoen Line	Oslo–Eidsvoll	64 km (40 mi)	New	210 km/h (130 mph)	1998	Operational
Dovre Line	Langset-Kleverud	17 km (11 mi) (of 484 km (301 mi))	New	200 km/h (125 mph)	2015	Operational
Dovre Line	Eidsvoll-Hamar(-Trondheim) (Note: excludung 17 km ready in 2015)	41 km (25 mi) (of 484 km (301 mi))	Upgraded	200 km/h (125 mph)	2027	Undergoing upgrade
Dovre Line	Hamar-Brumunddal-Lillehammer	55 km (34 mi)	Partly new	250 km/h (155 mph)	2030 (Note: Hamar-Brumunddal)-2035 (Note: Brumunddal-Lillehammer)	Undergoing upgrade and construction
Vestfold Line	Farriseidet–Porsgrunn	23.5 km (14.6 mi)	Upgraded	200 km/h (125 mph)	2018	Operational
Vestfold Line	Drammen–Kobbervikdalen	9 km (5.6 mi)	Partly new	200 km/h (125 mph)	2025	Under construction
Vestfold Line	Kobbervikdalen–Holm	24.7 km (15.3 mi)	Partly new	200 km/h (125 mph)	2001–2002	Operational
Vestfold Line	Nykirke – Holm	14.1 km (8.8 mi)	New	200 km/h (125 mph)	2016	Operational
Vestfold Line	Nykirke – Barkåker	13.6 km (8.5 mi)	New	250 km/h (155 mph)	2026	Under construction
Vestfold Line	Tønsberg – Barkåker	7.7 km (4.8 mi)	New	200 km/h (125 mph)	2011	Operational
Vestfold Line	Tønsberg–Larvik	40 km (25 mi)	New	200 km/h (125 mph)	2032	Under construction
Follo Line	Oslo–Ski	22 km (14 mi)	New	200 km/h (125 mph)	2022	Operational
Østfold Line	Ski–Fredrikstad	50 km (31 mi)	Partly new	250 km/h (155 mph)	2029	Undergoing upgrade and construction

=== Poland ===
Line	Termini	Length	Type	Maximum speed	Opening	Status
Warsaw–Gdańsk railway	Warszawa Wschodnia–Gdańsk Główny	150 km (93 mi)	Upgraded	200 km/h (125 mph)	2014–2020	Operational
Grodzisk Mazowiecki–Zawiercie railway	Grodzisk Mazowiecki–Zawiercie	135.047 km (83.914 mi)	Upgraded	200 km/h (125 mph)	1977 (Note: constructed with geometrically allowed 250 km/h option already)–2011	Operational
Warsaw-Białystok railway	Warszawa Wschodnia–Białystok	224.1 km (139.2 mi)	Upgraded	250 km/h (155 mph)	2030	Undergoing upgrade
Y-line	Warsaw–Lodz–Wroclaw/Poznan	140 km (87 mi) (Note: Warsaw–Lodz; extra 310 km beyond in next phase)	New	350 km/h (220 mph)	2032?	Approved

=== Portugal ===
Line	Termini	Length	Type	Maximum speed	Opening	Status
Linha do Norte	Santa Apolónia, Lisbon–Campanhã, Porto	332 km (206 mi)	Upgraded	220 km/h (140 mph)	1999	Operational
Linha do Sul	Campolide, Lisbon–Tunes, Silves	273.6 km (170.0 mi)	Upgraded	220 km/h (140 mph)	2004	Operational
Linha de Évora	Casa Branca–Évora	26.164 km (16.258 mi)	Upgraded	200 km/h (125 mph)	2010	Operational
Porto–Lisbon high-speed rail line	Porto-Campanhã – Lisbon-Santa Apolónia	290 km (180 mi)	New	300 km/h (186 mph)	2030	Under construction
Porto–Vigo high-speed rail line	Porto – Vigo on Galicia, Spain borders	155.6 km (96.7 mi)	New	250 km/h (155 mph)	2032	Under construction
Lisbon–Madrid high-speed rail line	Lisbon – Madrid on Extremadura, Spain borders	644 km (400 mi)	New	300 km/h (186 mph)	2030	Under construction

=== Russia ===
Line	Termini	Length	Type	Maximum speed	Opening	Status
Saint Petersburg–Moscow railway	Moscow Leningradsky–Moskovsky (Saint Petersburg)	650 km (400 mi)	Upgraded	250 km/h (155 mph)	1984	Operational
Moscow–Saint Petersburg HSR	Moscow–Saint Petersburg	679 km (422 mi)	New	360 km/h (220 mph)	2029	Under construction
Riihimäki–Saint Petersburg railway	Finnish border–St. Petersburg	197 km (122 mi)	Upgraded	200 km/h (125 mph)	2013	Service discontinued

=== Serbia ===
Line	Termini	Length	Type	Maximum speed	Opening	Status
Budapest–Belgrade railway	Hungarian border–Belgrade	150 km (93 mi)	Upgraded	200 km/h (125 mph)	2025	Operational
Belgrade - Niš	Belgrade–Niš	228 km (142 mi)	Upgraded	200 km/h (125 mph)	2026	Undergoing upgrade

=== Spain ===
Overview of Spanish high-speed rail network (January 2025)

Line	Termini	Length	Type	Maximum speed	Opening	Status
Madrid–Seville	Madrid Atocha–Seville–Santa Justa	471.8 km (293.2 mi)	New	300 km/h (186 mph)	1992	Operational
Madrid–Levante	Madrid Atocha–Valencia-Joaquín Sorolla/Alicante	603 km (375 mi)	New	300 km/h (186 mph)	1997–2010–2022	Operational
Madrid–Barcelona	Madrid Atocha–Barcelona Sants	620.9 km (385.8 mi)	New	300 km/h (186 mph) (Note: 310 km/h previously; 330 km/h designed)	2003–2008	Operational
Zaragoza-Huesca branch of Madrid–Barcelona high-speed rail line	Zaragoza–Huesca	57 km (35 mi)	New	200 km/h (125 mph)	2005	Operational
Madrid–Toledo	Madrid Atocha–Toledo	74 km (46 mi)	New	300 km/h (186 mph)	2005	Operational
Madrid–Málaga	Cordoba–Málaga María Zambrano	154.5 km (96.0 mi)	New	300 km/h (186 mph)	2007	Operational
Madrid–Galicia	Madrid Chamartín–Santiago de Compostela	415.7 km (258.3 mi)	New	300 km/h (186 mph)	2011–2021	Operational
Perpignan–Barcelona	Perpignan–Barcelona Sants	175.5 km (109.1 mi) (Note: including 24.6 km in France)	New	300 km/h (186 mph)	2013	Operational
Seville–Cádiz railway	Seville–Santa Justa–Cádiz	158.1 km (98.2 mi)	Upgraded	220 km/h (140 mph)	2015	Operational
Atlantic Axis	A Coruña–Vigo-Urzáiz	155.6 km (96.7 mi)	New	200 km/h (125 mph)	2015	Operational
Madrid–Asturias	Madrid Chamartín–Lena, Asturias	342.3 km (212.7 mi)	New	300 km/h (186 mph)	2015–2023	Operational
Valencia–Sant Vicenç de Calders railway	Estació del Nord, Valencia–Sant Vicenç de Calders, El Vendrell	238 km (148 mi)	Upgraded	220 km/h (140 mph)	2018	Operational
Andalusian Corridor	Antequera-Santa Ana–Granada	125.7 km (78.1 mi)	New	300 km/h (186 mph)	2019	Operational
Andalusian Corridor	Antequera-Santa Ana-Cadiz	146 km (91 mi)	partly new	300 km/h (186 mph)	2030	Under construction
Andalusian Corridor	Granada–Almería	75 km (47 mi)	New	300 km/h (186 mph)	2030	Under construction
Alcázar de San Juan–Jaén	Grañena–Jaén	16.7 km (10.4 mi)	Partly new	200 km/h (125 mph)	2020	Operational
Alcázar de San Juan–Jaén	Alcázar de San Juan–Mora	67.5 km (41.9 mi)	Partly new	300 km/h (186 mph)	TBD	Under construction
Madrid–Extremadura high-speed rail line	Badajoz–Plasencia	192.6 km (119.7 mi)	Partly new	200 km/h (125 mph)	2022	Operational
Madrid–Extremadura high-speed rail line	Plasencia–Talayuela (Oropesa)	68.6 km (42.6 mi)	Partly new	250 km/h (155 mph)	2025	Under construction
Madrid–Extremadura high-speed rail line	Oropesa–Toledo	127 km (79 mi)	Partly new	200 km/h (125 mph)	2030	Under construction
LAV Venta de Baños-Burgos-Vitoria	Venta de Baños-Burgos	86 km (53 mi)	New	300 km/h (186 mph)	2022	Operational
LAV Venta de Baños-Burgos-Vitoria	Burgos - Miranda de Ebro - Vitoria	51.8 km (32.2 mi)	New	300 km/h (186 mph)	2028	Under construction
LAV Palencia–Santander	Palencia–Alar del Rey	78.4 km (48.7 mi)	New	350 km/h (220 mph)	TBD	Under construction
LAV Palencia–Santander	Alar del Rey–Reinosa	44.4 km (27.6 mi)	New	350 km/h (220 mph)	TBD	Under construction
Murcia–Almería	Murcia del Carmen–Almería	184 km (114 mi)	New	300 km/h (186 mph)	2026	Under construction
Two Seas corridor	Castejon–Pamplona	150 km (93 mi)	New	300 km/h (186 mph)	2027	Under construction
Two Seas corridor	Zaragoza–Castejon	150 km (93 mi)	New	300 km/h (186 mph)	2033	Under construction
Basque Y	Bilbao–Vitoria-Gasteiz/San Sebastián	172 km (107 mi)	New	220 km/h (140 mph)	2027	Under construction

=== Sweden ===
A map of railways in Sweden: 250 km/h (155 mph) 200 km/h (125 mph) <200 km/h (125 mph) <140 km/h (87 mph) (unelectrified)

Line	Termini	Length	Type	Maximum speed	Opening	Status
Southern Main Line	Malmö–Katrineholm	336 km (209 mi) (Note: out of 483)	Upgraded	200 km/h (125 mph)	1990	Operational
Western Main Line	Stockholm–Gothenburg	312 km (194 mi) (Note: out of 390)	Upgraded	200 km/h (125 mph)	1995	Operational
West Coast Line	Lund–Gothenburg	232 km (144 mi) (Note: out of 290)	Upgraded, partly new	200 km/h (125 mph)	1985–2023	Operational
East Coast Line	Stockholm–Gävle	142 km (88 mi) (Note: out of 150)	Upgraded, partly new	200 km/h (125 mph)	1997–2017	Operational
East Coast Line	Söderhamn–Enånger	105 km (65 mi)	Partly new	200 km/h (125 mph)	1999	Operational
East Coast Line	Enånger–Sundsvall and Gävle north bypass	210 km (130 mi)	Partly new	200 km/h (125 mph)	2030 (Note: first 50 km)–2040	Under construction
Ådalen Line	Kramfors–Härnösand	30 km (19 mi) (Note: out of 58 km total)	Partly new	200 km/h (125 mph)	2012	Operational
Svealand Line	Södertälje South–Folkesta	86 km (53 mi)	New	200 km/h (125 mph)	1997	Operational
Mälaren Line	Solhem-Västerås; Harksta–Kolbäck; Arboga–Hovsta	155 km (96 mi)	Upgraded, partly new	200 km/h (125 mph)	2005	Operational
Bothnia Line	Höga Kusten Airport–Umeå	190 km (120 mi)	New	250 km/h (155 mph) (Note: No trains operate above 200 km/h)	2010	Operational
Norway/Vänern Line	Gothenburg–Öxnered	80 km (50 mi)	Upgraded, partly new	200 km/h (125 mph)	2012	Operational
Haparanda Line	Kalix–Haparanda	43 km (27 mi)	Partly new	250 km/h (155 mph)	2012	Operational
North Bothnia Line	Umeå–Luleå	270 km (170 mi)	New	250 km/h (155 mph)	2026–2038+	Under construction
The East Link	Järna–Linköping	160 km (99 mi)	New	250 km/h (155 mph)	2035	Under construction
Stockholm–Uppsala Quad Tracks	Stockholm–Uppsala	23 km (14 mi)	New?	250 km/h (155 mph)?	2034	Approved
Gothenburg–Borås Double Tracks	Gothenburg–Borås	60 km (37 mi)	New	250 km/h (155 mph)	2039–2041	Approved
Hässleholm–Lund Quad Tracks	Hässleholm–Lund	60 km (37 mi)	New	250 km/h (155 mph)	≈2040	Approved

=== Switzerland ===
Line	Termini	Length	Type	Maximum speed	Opening	Status
Solothurn–Wanzwil railway	NA (Connecting line)	12 km (7.5 mi)	New	200 km/h (125 mph)	2004	Operational
Mattstetten–Rothrist new line	Olten–Bern	45 km (28 mi)	New	200 km/h (125 mph)	2007	Operational
Lötschberg Base Tunnel	NA (Connecting line)	34 km (21 mi)	New	250 km/h (155 mph) (Note: For tilting trains; rest of the passenger trains operate at 200 km/h)	2007	Operational
Gotthard Base Tunnel	NA (Connecting line)	57 km (35 mi)	New	200 km/h (125 mph) (Note: 230 km/h in case of delay; 250 km/h designed speed)	2016	Operational
Ceneri Base Tunnel	NA (Connecting line)	15.4 km (9.6 mi)	New	200 km/h (125 mph) (Note: 230 km/h in case of delay; 250 km/h designed speed)	2020	Operational
Simplon Railway	Vallorbe–Domodossola	232.5 km (144.5 mi)	Upgraded	200 km/h (125 mph)	2030	Undergoing upgrade

=== Turkey ===
See Asian section.

=== United Kingdom ===
Operational high-speed lines in the UK: 140–186 mph (225–300 km/h) 125 mph (200 km/h) <110 mph (180 km/h)

Line	Termini	Length	Type	Maximum speed	Opening	Status
Great Western Main Line	London Paddington–Bristol Temple Meads	190.2 km (118.2 mi)	Upgraded	201 km/h (125 mph)	1976	Operational
South Wales Main Line	London Paddington–Pilning	34.5 km (21.4 mi) (Note: out of 116.5 km total)	Upgraded	201 km/h (125 mph) (Note: English section only; the Welsh is slower)	1976	Operational
East Coast Main Line	London King's Cross–Edinburgh	552.7 km (343.4 mi) (Note: out of 632.7 km total)	Upgraded	201 km/h (125 mph) (Note: 225 km/h in case of delay)	1978	Operational
Cross Country Route	York–Bristol Temple Meads	56 km (35 mi)	Upgraded	201 km/h (125 mph)	1982	Operational
West Coast Main Line	Glasgow central–Euston, London	442 km (275 mi) (Note: out of 642 km total)	Upgraded	201 km/h (125 mph)	2005	Operational
High Speed 1	Fawkham Junction–Channel Tunnel	74 km (46 mi)	New	300 km/h (186 mph) (Note: international services only, domestic are limited 225 km/h)	2003	Operational
High Speed 1	St Pancras, London–Ebbsfleet	39.4 km (24.5 mi)	New	230 km/h (143 mph) (Note: international services only, domestic are limited 225 km/h)	2007	Operational
Midland Main Line	St Pancras, London / Derby / Nottingham / Chesterfield	100 km (62 mi) (Note: out of 500 km total)	Upgraded	201 km/h (125 mph) (Note: straight sections only, 90-110 mph at curves)	2009	Operational
High Speed 2	Euston, London–Birmingham Curzon Street	230 km (140 mi)	New	320 km/h (200 mph)	2036+	Under construction
High Speed 2	Crewe-Manchester	153 km (95 mi)	New	300 km/h (186 mph) (Note: 360 km/h by other sources)	2040+	Suspended, revived as a private initiative

== America ==
=== United States ===
Line	Termini	Length	Type	Maximum speed	Opening	Status
Northeast Corridor	Boston–Washington, D.C.	735 km (457 mi) (Note: While the Northeast Corridor spans 735 km, only 80.3 km of its section support 240 km/h speeds. Several stretches of track on the Northeast Corridor can support up to 201 km/h speeds, but those speeds are the international standard definition of high-speed rail for upgraded tracks, and also are considered higher-speed rail by FRA standards.)	Upgraded	260 km/h (160 mph)	1969	Operational
Brightline	Orlando Airport–Cocoa	56.3 km (35 mi) (Note: While Brightline spans 273.5 km between Orlando and Miami, only a newly built section of 56.3 km between Orlando and Cocoa support speeds of up to 200 km/h, with the rest of the section supporting 180 km/h.)	New (Note: The 56.3 km stretch between Orlando and Cocoa which supports 200 km/h is newly built.)	201 km/h (125 mph) (Note: Though speeds up to 201 km/h are the international standard definition of high-speed rail on upgraded tracks, Brightline is more considered higher-speed rail by FRA standards.)	2023	Operational
California HSR	San Francisco–Los Angeles (Note: Initially only between Merced and Bakersfield.)	275 km (171 mi) (Note: The Initial Operating Segment will be 275 km (171 mi), while the completed Phase 1 route will be 795 km (494 mi). The completed system, which includes Phase 2 (covering Sacramento and San Diego), will be 1,249 km (776 mi). Phase 2 has yet to begin construction.)	New (Note: With existing portions between San Francisco-Gilroy at Phase 1 and Los Angeles and Anaheim at Phase 2.)	354 km/h (220 mph) (Note: Possibly 110 mph at Phase 2 in Los Angeles-Anaheim upgraded segment.)	2031–2033 (Note: Not at full length; the full network would take another 5-10 years.)	Under construction
Brightline West	Las Vegas–Los Angeles (Note: The Brightline West will run to the Rancho Cucamonga station in Greater Los Angeles, where riders will be able to use the Metrolink San Bernardino Line to connect to Los Angeles Union Station.)	351 km (218 mi)	New	322 km/h (200 mph)	2029	Under construction

== See also ==
- Proposed high-speed rail by country
- List of high-speed trains
- Higher-speed rail
- List of countries by rail transport network size
