= V Train =

V Train could refer to:

- The V (New York City Subway service)
- The V/Line, a not for profit regional passenger train and coach service in Victoria, Australia
- The V-Train (Korail)
