= Brainport line =

Brainport line is a proposed 158-kilometre (98 mi) railway connection between Brussels, Antwerp, Eindhoven and Moers. The project would build a new railway line starting from Ranst and would run along the E34/A67 highway up until Moers. It would then connect to the current German railway system. This project would be considered as an alternative to the iron rhine railway.

The original purpose of this railway line was to establish a faster freight connection between the Port of Antwerp and the Ruhr area and beyond. It had an intended minimum passenger speed of 140 km/h (87 mph) and a maximum speed of 160 km/h (99 mph). It had a theoretical potential of 35.000 passengers a day with 2 stop train and 1 IC train per hour, The original costs was estimated at 8,1 billion Gulden. To make this route profitable, 7 to 8 trains we're needed to run on this route per direction per hour.

== Alternatives ==
On 18 February, 2026. The Belgian minister Jean-Luc Crucke (Les éngagées) signed a declaration of intention with Thierry Aartsen (VVD). In that declaration both countries recognized the economic importance of a connection between ASML and European institutions in Brussels. It was introduced as a first step with meetings starting from summer 2026. However this for research purposes. The current ministers of mobility would meet each other once a year and 2 times per year a meeting would be organised by Belgian-Dutch work groups and other gatherings by experts per file. The Iron Rhine would be reseen as part of this declaration.

The following appointments were mentioned in the declaration:

- Rollout of ERTMS.
- Expansion of passenger capacity between border connections.
- Improving border connections between Belgium and Limburg.
- Initiating studies about connections between Belgium and Noord-Brabant.
- Finding solutions about bottlenecks for cross-border connections.
- Finishing the development of a connection between the port of Antwerp and the Ruhr (3RX).
- Concrete steps for improving freight rail between Ghent and Terneuzen.
- Improving the resilience and capacity of cross-border military mobility.
- Improving the efficiency of rail transport (autonomous rail).
- Guidelines for capacity allocation according to EU regulation.

In that research, 2 scenario's would be considered. The 1st one being a new railway line, and the 2nd one being upgrading existing infrastructure and establishing a direct passenger rail connection between Antwerp and Eindhoven. It would be a part of other mobility measures to increase economic activity between the Netherlands and Belgium.

The 1st option was put off the table due to its cost exceeding 7 to 8 billion euros.

The 2nd option would include the following options to establish a direct passenger connection between Antwerp and Eindhoven:

1. A direct connection via Breda
2. A renovation and reopening of the railway section between Hamont and Weert
3. A new railway line between Turnhout and Eindhoven

== See also ==
- High-speed rail in Belgium
- High-speed rail in the Netherlands
