= Chungbuk Line =

Railway line in South Korea

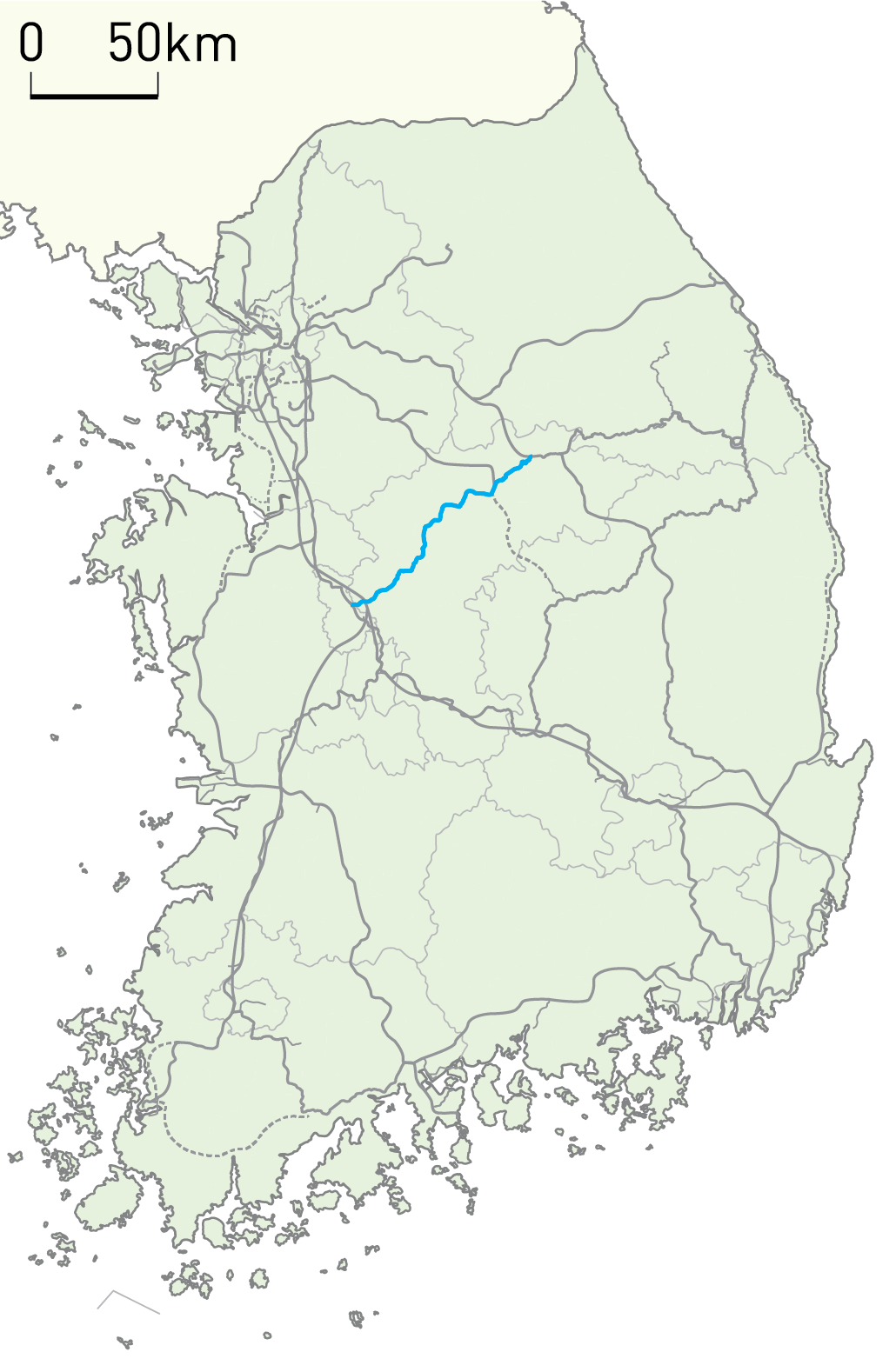

Overview
- Native name: 충북선(忠北線)
- Status: Operational
- Owner: Korea Rail Network Authority
- Locale: Sejong; North Chungcheong
- Termini: Jochiwon; Bongyang
- Stations: 16

Service
- Type: Freight/Passenger
- Operator: Korail

History
- Opened: 1 November 1921

Technical
- Line length: 115.0 km (71.5 mi)
- Track gauge: 1,435 mm (4 ft 8 1/2 in)
- Electrification: 25 kV 60 Hz Overhead Lines
- Operating speed: 100 km/h (62 mph)

The Chungbuk Line (Korean: 충북선; Hanja: 忠北線) is a railway line serving North Chungcheong Province in South Korea. The line connects Jochiwon on the Gyeongbu Line to Bongyang on the Jungang Line, serving the major cities of Cheongju and Chungju en route. Cheongju International Airport is located near the rail line.

== History ==
=== Prewar ===
The first section of the line was opened by the privately owned Chōsen Central Railway in 1921, which became part of the Chōsen Railway (Chōtetsu) in 1923. Chōtetsu then continued to extend the line until 1928 to Chungju as follows:

Date	Section	Length
1 November 1921	Jochiwon–Cheongju	22.7 km
1 May 1923	Cheongju–Cheongan (Jeungpyeong)	23.9 km
25 December 1928	Cheongan–Chungju	47.4 km

Plans existed to continue the line from Chungju to Yeongwol, but after the end of Japanese rule this plan was abandoned until 1949, after which the extension was built as the Korean National Railroad's Taebaek Line.

In the November 1942 timetable, the last issued prior to the start of the Pacific War, Chōtetsu operated the following schedule of local passenger services ("R" indicates that train was operated by railcar):

Dist. ↓	Price K. yen		1	101 R	3	5	103 R	7	105 R	9	Station name	Dist. ↑	Price K. yen		10	2	102 R	4	104 R	6	106	8
Dist. ↓	2nd cl.	3rd cl.	1	101 R	3	5	103 R	7	105 R	9	Station name	Dist. ↑	2nd cl.	3rd cl.	10	2	102 R	4	104 R	6	106	8
0.0	-	-	07:40	08:48	11:40	14:00	16:10	17:30	18:40	20:50	Jochiwon	94.0	6.60	3.30	06:28	09:31	08:25	12:25	14:47	15:51	18:15	20:21
22.7	1.70	0.85	08:45	09:29	12:50	15:30	16:52	18:40	19:22	21:32	Cheongju	71.3	5.00	2.50	05:50	08:50	07:40	11:40	14:05	15:10	17:30	19:40
94.0	6.60	3.30	11:06	...	15:11	17:56	...	20:58	...	...	Chungju	0.0	-	-	...	06:00	...	08:50	...	12:10	...	16:50

=== Postwar ===
Like the other private railways this line was also nationalized after the independence of Korea. The rest section of the line was opened on January 10, 1959.

=== Upgrade ===
The double-track construction began on October 20, 1975, and on October 17, 1980, 113.2 km between Jochiwon and Bongyang was double-tracked. During the double-track construction, some sections were relocated. The entire line was electrified on 30 March 2005.

On September 1, 2010, the South Korean government announced a strategic plan to reduce travel times from Seoul to 95% of the country to under 2 hours by 2020. As part of the plan, the Chungbuk Line is to be upgraded for 230 km/h and may see KTX service.

The movie Peppermint Candy was shot near Gongjeon station.

== Route ==
Station	Hangul	Hanja	Connecting lines and services	Station distance	Line distance	Location	
Station	Hangul	Hanja	Connecting lines and services	km		Location	
Jochiwon	조치원	鳥致院	Gyeongbu ITX-Saemaeul services Mugunghwa-ho services	0.0	0.0	Sejong	Jochiwon
Osong	오송	五松	Gyeongbu HSR; Osong Line; O-Train	4.4	4.4	N. Chungcheong	Cheongju
Cheongju	청주	淸州		7.0	11.4	N. Chungcheong	Cheongju
Ogeunjang	오근장	梧根場		10.1	21.5	N. Chungcheong	Cheongju
Cheongju Int'l Airport	청주공항	淸州空港		2.9	24.4	N. Chungcheong	Cheongju
Naesu	내수	內秀		4.4	28.8	N. Chungcheong	Cheongju
Jeungpyeong	증평	曾坪		7.8	36.6	N. Chungcheong	Jeungpyeong County
Doan	도안	道安		6.2	42.8	N. Chungcheong	Jeungpyeong County
Bocheon	보천	甫川		8.7	51.5	N. Chungcheong	Eumseong County
Eumseong	음성	陰城		8.1	59.6	N. Chungcheong	Eumseong County
Soi	소이	蘇伊		4.5	64.1	N. Chungcheong	Eumseong County
Judeok	주덕	周德		7.8	71.9	N. Chungcheong	Chungju
Dalcheon	달천	達川		7.0	78.9	N. Chungcheong	Chungju
Chungju	충주	忠州	Jungbunaeryuk Line	3.8	82.7	N. Chungcheong	Chungju
Mokhaeng	목행	牧杏		5.4	88.1	N. Chungcheong	Chungju
Dongnyang	동량	東良		4.6	92.7	N. Chungcheong	Chungju
Samtan	삼탄	三灘		7.9	100.6	N. Chungcheong	Chungju
Gongjeon	공전	公田		5.8	106.4	N. Chungcheong	Jecheon
Bongyang	봉양	鳳陽		8.6	115.0	N. Chungcheong	Jecheon

== Original route ==
忠北線 - 충북선 - Chūhoku Line - Chungbuk Line
Distance		Station name				
Total; km	S2S; km	Transcribed, Korean	Transcribed, Japanese	Hunminjeongeum	Hanja/Kanji	Connections
0.0	0.0	Jochiwon	Chōchiin	조치원	鳥致院	Sentetsu Gyeongbu Line
4.4	4.4	Osong	Goshō	오송	五松	
7.7	3.3	Wolgok	Gekkoku	월곡	月谷	
22.7	18.3	Cheongju	Shōshū	청주	淸州	
32.8	10.1	Ogeunjang	Gokonjō	오근장	梧根場	
40.1	7.3	Naesu	Naishū	내수	內秀	
47.9	7.8	Cheongan	Shōan	청안	清安	
62.8	14.9	Bocheon	Fusen	보천	甫川	
70.9	8.1	Eumseong	Injō	음성	陰城	
75.4	4.5	Soi	Soi	소이	蘇伊	
83.2	7.8	Daesowon	Taishōin	대소원	大召院	
94.0	10.8	Chungju	Chūshū	충주	忠州	

== See also ==
- Korail
- Transportation in South Korea

== Bibliography ==
- Japanese Government Railways, (1937), 鉄道停車場一覧. 昭和12年10月1日現在(The List of the Stations as of 1 October 1937), Kawaguchi Printing Company, Tokyo, p 507
