= Jungbunaeryuk Line =

Railway line in South Korea

Overview
- Status: Operational
- Owner: Korea Rail Network Authority
- Locale: Gyeonggi; North Chungcheong; North Gyeongsang
- Termini: Bubal; Mungyeong
- Stations: 9

Service
- Type: Heavy rail, Passenger/Freight; Regional rail
- Operator: Korail
- Rolling stock: KTX-Eum

History
- Opened: 2021-12-31

Technical
- Line length: 94.1 km (58.5 mi)
- Number of tracks: Single track
- Track gauge: 1,435 mm (4 ft 8 1/2 in) standard gauge
- Electrification: 25 kV 60 Hz AC
- Operating speed: 230 km/h (140 mph) (maximum)

Korean name
- Hangul: 중부내륙선
- Hanja: 中部內陸線
- RR: Jungbu naeryukseon
- MR: Chungbu naeryuksŏn

The Jungbunaeryuk Line (Korean: 중부내륙선; lit. 'Middle Inland line') is a rail line in operation from Bubal to Mungyeong. Construction started in November 2015. The line opened in December 2021 between Bubal on the Gyeonggang Line & Chungju on the Chungbuk Line. The KTX line was extended in 30 November 2024 from Chungju to Mungyeong. Another extension from Mungyeong to Gimcheon was approved in December 2022.

== Rolling stock ==
- KTX-Eum (since 2021)

== Stations ==
Station name			Transfer	Distance in km		Location	
Romanized	Hangul	Hanja	Transfer	Station distance	Total distance	Location	
Bubal	부발	夫鉢	Gyeonggang Line	0.0	0.0	Gyeonggi-do	Icheon-si
Ami	아미	牙美		2.5	2.5	Gyeonggi-do	Icheon-si
Ganam	가남	加南		6.5	9.0	Gyeonggi-do	Yeoju-si
GamgokJanghowon	감곡장호원	甘谷長湖院		12.2	21.2	Chungcheongbuk-do	Eumseong-gun
Angseongoncheon	앙성온천	仰城溫泉		14.6	35.8	Chungcheongbuk-do	Chungju
Geumga	금가	金加		11.8	47.6	Chungcheongbuk-do	Chungju
Chungju	충주	忠州	Chungbuk Line	8.7	56.3	Chungcheongbuk-do	Chungju
Salmi	살미	乷味		10.3	66.6	Chungcheongbuk-do	Chungju
Suanbooncheon	수안보온천	水安保溫泉		8.5	75.1	Chungcheongbuk-do	Chungju
Yeonpung	연풍	延豊		6.3	81.4	Chungcheongbuk-do	Goesan-gun
Mungyeong	문경	聞慶	Mungyeong Line	11.3	92.7	Gyeongsangbuk-do	Mungyeong

== Services ==
KTX-Eum operate on this line 4 times a day since December 31, 2021.
