= HSL-Oost =

Proposed railway line

HSR network around The Netherlands (detail from the map of Europe's high-speed rail lines). The grey line between Amsterdam and the German border is the route where the cancelled HSL-Oost had been planned.
Max operational speed 310-320 km/h
Max operational speed 270-300 km/h
Max operational speed 240-260 km/h
Max operational speed 200-230 km/h
Under construction for max operational speed ≥ 200 km/h
Max operational speed < 200 km/h

HSL-Oost (Dutch: Hogesnelheidslijn-Oost, English: High-Speed Line East) is the name of the now-cancelled high-speed railway line from Amsterdam to Germany via the Dutch cities of Utrecht and Arnhem.

The plan for HSL-Oost was approved in 1989. The project was cancelled by Transport Minister Tineke Netelenbos in 2001, as it was deemed unprofitable: the gain in travel time and the expected amount of travellers was insufficient to justify the investment of 4–7 billion euros. The decision was influenced by other international high-speed rail construction projects with high and unexpected costs and unforeseen complexities.

The scope of the project was reduced to some improvements to the existing railway between Utrecht and the German border. The railway between Amsterdam and Utrecht has been doubled from two to four tracks with the outer tracks prepared for 200 km/h and the overhead wiring prepared for the necessary 25 kV required for high-speed trains, though without 25 kV power supply, high-speed is not attainable. Still, it is expected that German ICE trains will be able to travel at 200 km/h from Amsterdam to Utrecht in the near future.

In 2009, a new feasibility study for HSL-Oost after the year 2020 was promised by Minister of Transport, Public Works and Water Management Camiel Eurlings.

== See also ==
- HSL-Zuid
