= High-speed rail in Uzbekistan =

High-speed rail system in Uzbekistan

High speed rail in Uzbekistan currently consists of 1161 km of track and services using Talgo 250 equipment, branded Afrosiyob as well as Hyundai Rotem KTX-Eum (EMU-260) high-speed equipment branded Jaloliddin Manguberdi by operator Uzbekistan Railways, on upgraded conventional lines. All HSR lines have been built using upgraded lines on Russian gauge. Other regional railways exist.

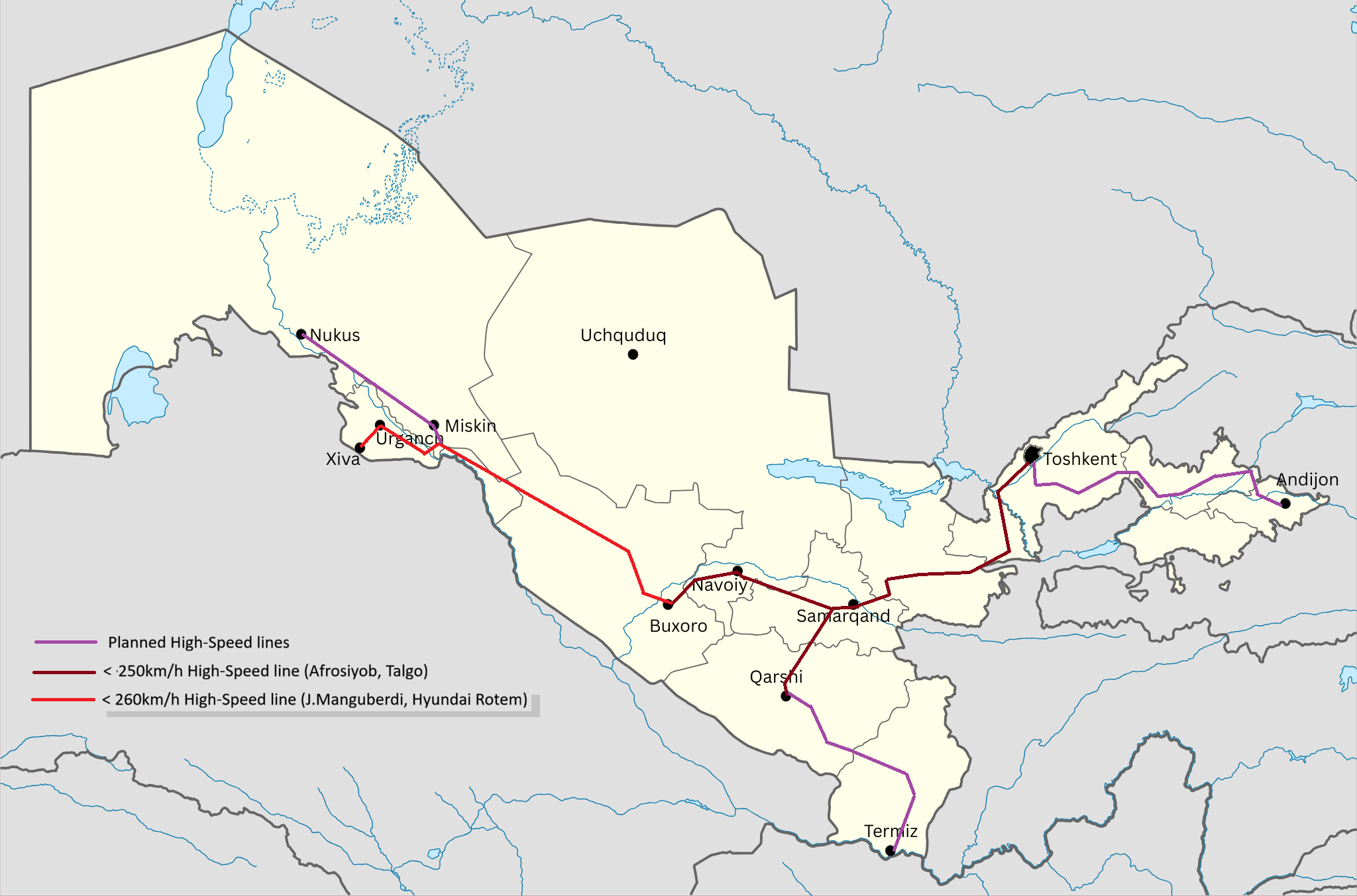
Uzbekistan HSR-network 2026

The country currently has two interoperated lines:

- Tashkent–Bukhara–Khiva high-speed rail line
  - The Tashkent–Samarkand section opened 2011 using HSR-capable trains while upgrading taking over 2.5 hours, in 2013 the 344-km route full commercial speed taking 2 hours and 8 minutes. Uzbekistan Railways management has raised the possibility of building a dedicated electrified line from Tashkent to Samarkand, shortening the journey to 1 hour and 20 minutes.
  - The Samarkand–Bukhara section opened Aug 2016, extension of the first line, 256-km route taking 1 hour 12 minutes, or from Tashkent 3 hours and 20 minutes.
  - The Bukhara–Urgench–Khiva section was opened in May 2026 and is 451 km long. The high-speed train "Jalaladdin Manguberdi" operates along this route, with a travel time of 7 hours and 42 minutes from Tashkent to Khiva.
- Samarkand-Qarshi high-speed rail line, a 141 km long extension to Qarshi started operation on August 22, 2015, though at lower speed of 160 km/h (100 mph).

By 2018, the high speed rail was operating beyond capacity, and tickets had to be booked months in advance. To combat this issue, the railway awarded a $62 million contract to Talgo to purchase an additional two 250 km/h (155 mph) tilting trains due to enter service in 2021, to join the other four currently in service; the new contract also requests extra coaches to expand the current nine-car trains to 11 cars each.

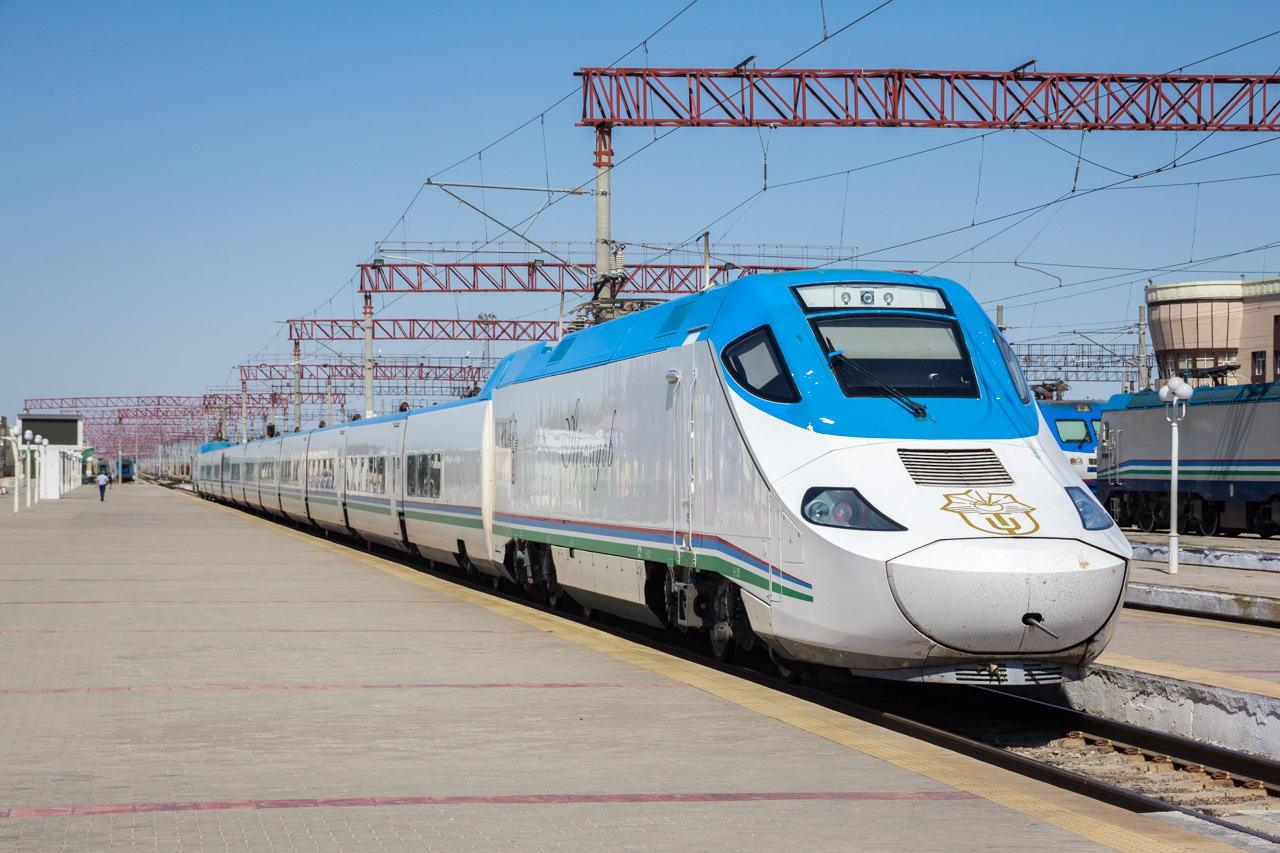
Afrosiyob at Bukhara Railway Station

Services from Tashkent to Almaty, Kazakhstan have been steadily improving from a travel time of 30 hours during the Soviet era to 16.5 hours as of 2017. There is also a 1.5 hour customs stop at the border. The service uses Tulpar-Talgo equipment of joined Uzbek-Kazakh rail cars. Similarly, the route from Almaty to the Chinese HSR rail head at Ürümqi has been upgraded to 8 hours (change of gauge), qualifying as a higher-speed rail link. The Chinese may be looking to develop the entire Ürümqi and Tashkent segment into a full speed HSR line due to Belt and Road, but as of 2017 this is far from certain. There is also a track gauge difference that effectively prevents high speed usage of current Uzbek HSR by China.

In January 2021, the Kazakh Prime Minister Asqar Mamin announced plans to extend the line in Tashkent across the border to Shymkent and Turkestan.

In April 2022, the Asian Infrastructure Investment Bank provided a $108 million loan to Uzbekistan for electrification of the 465km line between Bukhara and Khiva, and high-speed trainsets are intended to eventually travel between Tashkent and Khiva. The current unelectrified line already has a design speed of 250 km/h (155 mph), and running the Afrosiyob trainsets will reduce travel time from six hours to two hours. In November 2022, President Shavkat Mirziyoyev announced that high-speed service to Khiva will be launched in 2024, and announced the launch of construction on an electrified high-speed rail extension to Nukus, decreasing travel times between Tashkent and Nukus from 16 hours to 7 hours.

In June 2024 Uzbekistan acquired six high-speed trains from Hyundai. The new trains will be named “Jalaladdin Manguberdi” in honor of the historical hero of Uzbekistan, emphasizing cultural significance and respect for national history. The trains are planned to operate on the “Tashkent – Urgench – Khiva” route, linking the capital with important tourist and economic centers of the country. This opens new opportunities for the development of domestic tourism and promotes economic growth in the regions. Each electric train will consist of seven cars and can carry up to 351 passengers. The maximum speed of the trains will be 250 kilometers per hour, significantly reducing travel time and making journeys between cities more convenient and faster. The new train was launched in May 2026.
