= Bongyang station =

Train station in South Korea

봉양
Bongyang
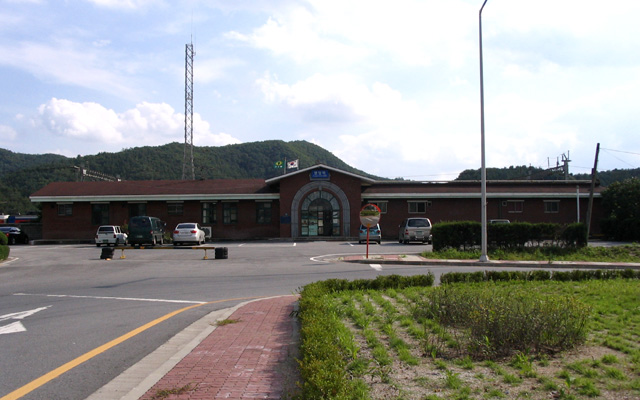
- Bongyang station

General information
- Location: Jangpyeong-ri, Bongyang-eup, Jecheon, North Chungcheong; South Korea
- Coordinates: 37°07′49″N 128°07′47″E
- Operator: Korail
- Lines: Jungang Line, Chungbuk Line

Construction
- Structure type: Aboveground

History
- Opened: July 1, 1941

Korean name
- Hangul: 봉양역
- Hanja: 鳳陽驛
- Revised Romanization: Bongyangnyeok
- McCune–Reischauer: Pongyangnyŏk
Location

Bongyang station (Korean: 봉양역) is a railway station in Bongyang, the city of Jecheon. It is on the Jungang Line and the Chungbuk Line. On July 1, 1941, with the opening of the Jungang Line, it opened as a regular station. Designated as a final station and a branch station along with the extension of the Chungbuk Line on December 31, 1958.

Passenger handling was suspended from December 9, 2016, but on January 5, 2021, the Seowonju-Jecheon double-track electrification work was completed and passenger operations resumed.
