= High-speed rail in the Netherlands =

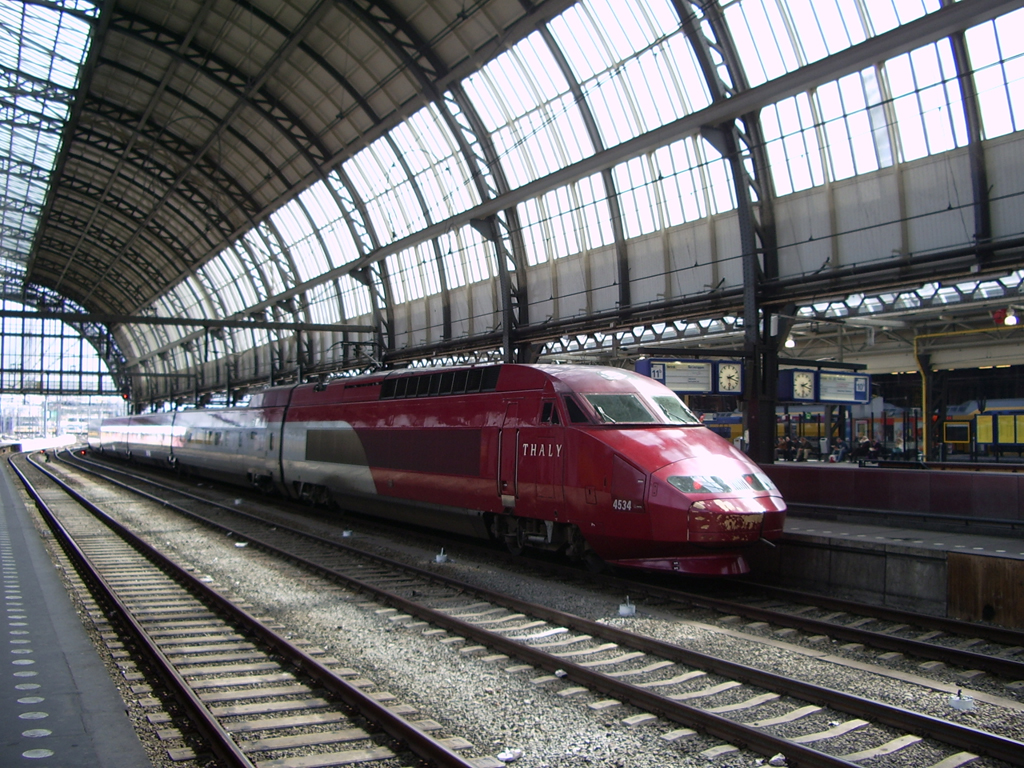
A Thalys train at Amsterdam Centraal

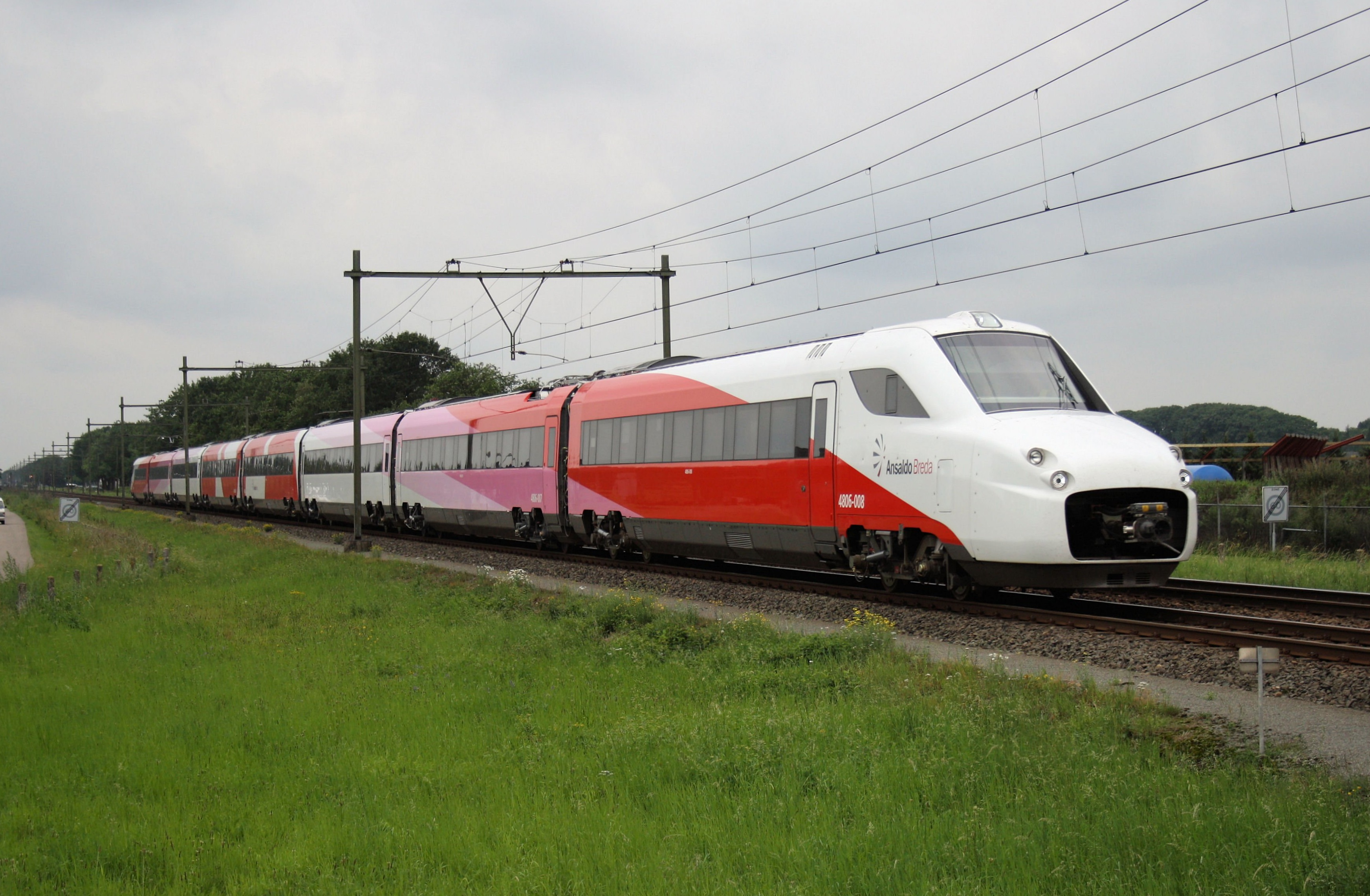
A Fyra train in the Dutch countryside

High-speed rail service in the Netherlands started in 2009 with the opening of the dedicated HSL-Zuid, which connects the Randstad via Brussels to the rest of the European high-speed rail network. In later years improved traditional rail sections were added to the high-speed network. Proposals for more dedicated high-speed lines were deemed too costly; plans for the HSL-Oost to Germany were mothballed and instead of the Zuiderzeelijn the less ambitious Hanzelijn was built to enable future high-speed service between the northern provinces and the Randstad.

As of 2025, four high-speed train services are operative in the Netherlands: Intercity Express (ICE), Eurostar, the Eurocity Direct and the domestic Intercity Direct that replaced the short-lived Fyra service, which was cancelled in 2013 after severe reliability issues.

== History ==
As early as 1973, the Den Uyl cabinet discussed a high-speed railway line in the Netherlands. It was not until 1988 that the Nederlandse Spoorwegen (NS) started three HSL projects, namely HSL-Zuid, HSL-Oost, and HSL-Noord (Zuiderzeelijn). The overall plan, called Rail 21, was approved in 1989, coinciding with the 150th anniversary of the first railway in the Netherlands (1839). HSL-Zuid was constructed between 2000 and 2006, and began operating in 2009. HSL-Oost was cancelled in 2001, HSL-Noord was cancelled in 2007. The Hanzelijn (constructed 2006–2012) partially took over HSL-Noord's role in connecting the west and north of the country through Lelystad and Zwolle, and has been built to be eventually upgraded to 200 km/h (120 mph), but so far trains on this track are not running at high speeds yet. New plans for a HSL-Noord, now dubbed 'Lelylijn' instead of 'Zuiderzeelijn', were unveiled in 2019; a feasibility study, with the support of all national political parties, is underway and expected to be finished in late 2020.

Following numerous problems with the V250 multiple units the Fyra service on HSL-Zuid was cancelled in January 2013 after less than two months in full service. A week later Thalys and Eurostar trains replaced the Fyra to a less frequent and slower timetable. In 2023, the Intercity Nieuwe Generatie (ICNG) was introduced on Dutch high-speed rails (HSL-Zuid and the Hanzelijn), running at 200 km/h (125 mph). The Thalys brand was replaced by Eurostar in October 2023.

== Lines ==
=== HSL-Zuid ===
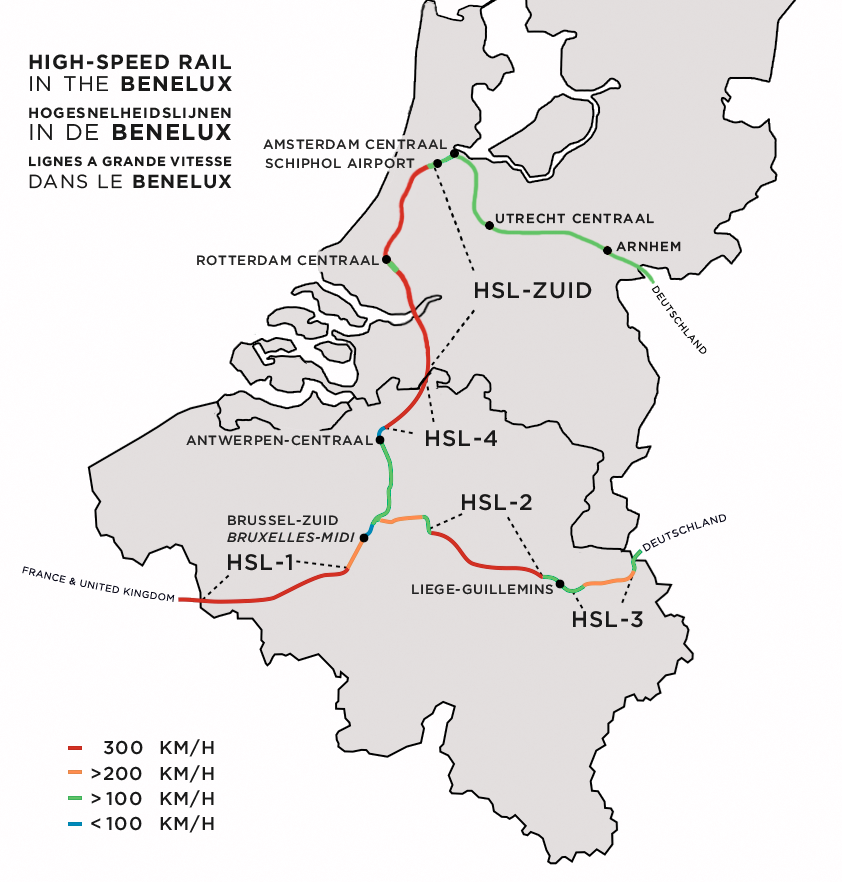
HSL-Zuid, connected to Antwerp with the HSL 4

HSL-Zuid (Dutch: Hogesnelheidslijn Zuid, English: High-Speed Line South) is a 125 km (78 miles) high-speed railway line in the Netherlands. Using existing tracks from Amsterdam Centraal to Schiphol Airport, the dedicated high-speed line begins here and continues to Rotterdam Centraal and to the Belgian border. Here, it connects to the HSL 4, terminating at Antwerpen-Centraal. Den Haag Centraal (The Hague) and Breda are connected to the high-speed line by conventional railway lines. Services running at 160 km/h (99 mph) on the HSL-Zuid began on 7 September 2009 between Amsterdam and Rotterdam. From December 2009, Thalys (now Eurostar) trains from Amsterdam to Brussels and Paris have run on HSL-Zuid. From December 2012 to January 2013 (40 days in total) the Fyra V250 trains ran on HSL-Zuid between Amsterdam and Brussels, only to have service suspended because of the poor quality (and safety risks) of the Italian-made trains.

Line	Route	Speed	Length	Construction began	Start of revenue services
HSL-Zuid	Schiphol - Antwerpen	300 km/h (186 mph)	147 km (91 mi) (125 km (78 mi) in the Netherlands)	2000	2009

==== Stations ====
The HSL-Zuid serves the following stations:

- Amsterdam Centraal
- Schiphol
- Rotterdam Centraal

Between Rotterdam and the Belgian border there is a branch to Breda (from 04-04-2011).

=== Hanzelijn ===
Hanzelijn (English: Hanseatic line) is a 50 km (31 miles) high-speed railway line in the Netherlands. It connects Lelystad, capital of the province of Flevoland, with Zwolle, capital of the neighbouring province of Overijssel, and provides a direct rail link between Flevoland and the north-east of the Netherlands. The maximum speed on the line is 200 km/h (124 mph), though no Dutch domestic rolling stock can achieve speeds greater than 160 km/h (99 mph). Only by clearing the line for International trains is the line speed of 200 km/h (124 mph) reached.

Line	Route	Speed	Length	Construction began	Start of revenue services
Hanzelijn	Lelystad - Zwolle	200 km/h (124 mph)	50 km (31 mi)	2007	2012

The completion of the Hanzelijn in 2012 turned Zwolle into the Netherlands' second-most important railway junction. A new type of train, the Intercity Nieuwe Generatie (ICNG), will be introduced in 2023 on the HSL-Zuid track from Breda via Rotterdam, Schiphol Airport, Amsterdam Zuid, Lelystad, Zwolle, Groningen and Leeuwarden. On the Breda–Schiphol HSL-Zuid stretch and the Lelystad–Zwolle Hanzelijn stretch, this new train will be able to achieve 200 km/h (124 mph) instead of the regular 160 km/h (99 mph). The current direct trains from Breda to Zwolle run via 's-Hertogenbosch and will take 2h 21m. The current fastest route is up to 8 minutes faster if you transfer at Rotterdam Centraal. The new direct route from Breda to Zwolle that will be using the HSL-Zuid removes the need for a transfer and the total trip time is expected to be shortened by roughly 30 minutes.

=== Proposed and cancelled lines ===
==== HSL-Oost ====
HSL-Oost (Dutch: Hogesnelheidslijn-Oost, English: High-Speed Line East) is the name of a proposed high-speed line from Amsterdam into Germany via the Dutch cities of Utrecht and Arnhem. The scope of the project has now been reduced, but it is expected that German ICE trains will be able to travel at 200 km/h (124 mph) from Amsterdam to Utrecht in the near future. Currently, ERTMS has been installed on the line, but the soil is soft and needs time to stabilize after the recent expansion works. Transport Minister Tineke Netelenbos turned against the HSL-Oost, deeming it unfeasible and arguing that public funds were better spent on improving existing infrastructure; the NS eventually agreed. In December 2001, the parliamentary coalition parties Labour, VVD and D66 finally voted in favour of Netelenbos' plan to not double the railway tracks until 2020, and instead only optimise the current two rails with sidetracks so that faster trains can overtake slower ones, and more efficient techniques to let trains drive more closely after one another beginning in 2007.

In 2009, a new feasibility study for the HSL-Oost after the year 2020 was promised by Transport Minister Camiel Eurlings. On 22 September 2010, the study named Synergie in railcorridors: Een onderzoek naar het integraal ontwerpen van railnetwerken was published, which stated that a new design method could make the HSL-Oost economical after all.

==== Other lines ====
According to the ProRail 2030 plan, several mainlines will be upgraded. To decrease journey time, some sections are likely to become operated at 160 km/h (99 mph) or 200 km/h (124 mph). Still it's uncertain, if the whole line between Amsterdam and Groningen will be upgraded or few stretches of it. By the end of 2021 the decision of selecting routes to be upgraded is to be made. Some of the mainlines, capable of 140 km/h (87 mph) can be upgraded to 160 km/h (99 mph) after re-signalling and even for 200 km/h (124 mph) after four-tracking and changing electrification from DC to AC.
