= O-Train (Korail) =

South Korean sightseeing train

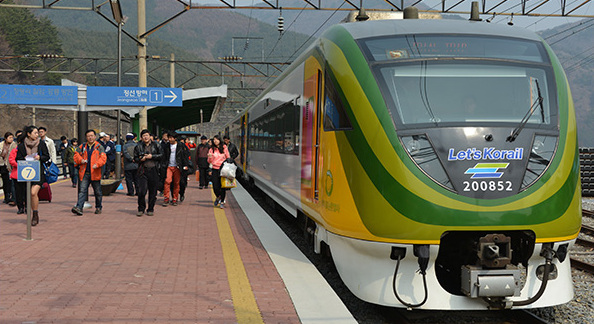

Overview
- Service type: Regional rail
- Status: Active
- Locale: South Korea
- Predecessor: Circular Snow Flower Train
- First service: April 12, 2013
- Last service: February 2, 2020
- Successor: East sea & Santa village Train
- Current operator(s): Korail

Route
- Termini: Seoul Station
- Stops: 17
- Line(s) used: Gyeongbu Line; Gyeongwon Line; Jungang Line; Taebaek Line; Yeongdong Line

On-board services
- Seating arrangements: Car No.1: Eco seats (56 seats): Two-person seats / four-person seats / free viewing seats / etc. Car No. 2: Reserved seats for people with disabilities, café room (37 seats): two-person seats / four-person seats / one-person seat / café room, table seats Car No.3: Family seats (56 seats) – Family seats / couple room / family room / etc. Car No.4: Eco seats (56) – Two-person seats / four-person seats / free viewing seats
- Catering facilities: On-board café

Technical
- Track gauge: 1,435 mm (4 ft 8 1/2 in) standard gauge

O-Train (a.k.a. Jungbu Naeryuk Circular Train Korean: 중부내륙순환열차) was a South Korean sightseeing train operated by Korail. The train began operations in 2013 and transports tourists from Seoul, in a circular route, through South Korea's central inland region and back to Seoul.

== Overview ==
The train began operations on April 12, 2013, and is a shuttle train which loops around attractions in the central inland region of Korea, with stops, including Taebaeksan Mountain in Gangwon-do, Yeongju in Gyeongsangbuk-do, and Jecheon in Chungcheongbuk-do. It follows the same route as the older Circular Snow Flower Train (Hangul: 환상선 눈꽃순환열차).

The "O" name refers to the train's circular route, and "One", as the three provinces it travels through. The train has four cars, observatory rooms, and sightseeing monitors, and departs from Seoul Station, Cheonan station, and Osong station daily. One of the stops is at Chujeon station in Gangwon-do, located at an altitude of 855 meters, the highest altitude for any train stop in Korea, for sightseeing and photos.

During its last season of operation the O-Train was rerouted to run out and back from Seoul to Cheoram via Buncheon eliminating the loop by removing its run along the Taebaek Line.

A sister Korail train, the V-Train, opened on the same day, and travels through the mountainous areas of the provinces of Gangwon-do and Gyeongsangbuk-do. O-Train passengers can transfer to the V-train at Cheoram, Seungbu and Buncheon stations.

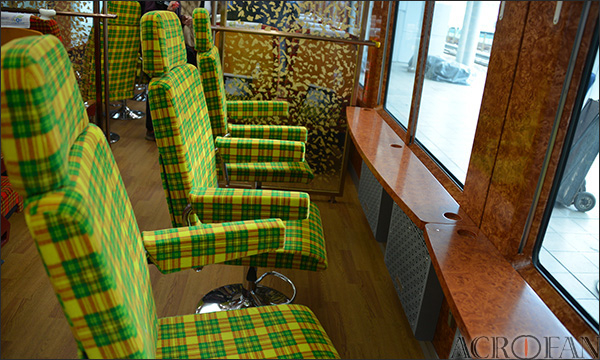
O-Train interior

The train's opening increased tourist interest in Gangwon's coal mining history. Buncheon station in Gyeongsangbuk-do, where a coal line once ran, showed increased visits in 2013, from both the O-Train and V-Trains, from approximately 10 passengers a day to 1000.

== Operations ==
- Started running: April 12, 2013
- Ceased operating: August 19, 2020 (succeeded by the Donghae Santa Train)
- Stations en route to and from "circle": Seoul Station - Cheongnyangni station - Suwon station - Cheonan station - Osong station
- Stations on "circle" route: Jecheon station - Wonju station - Yeongwol station - Mindungsan station– Gohan station– Chujeon - Taebaek station - Cheoram station - Seungbu station - Buncheon station - Chunyang station – Bonghwa station – Yeongju station - Punggi station - Danyang station
- Approximate travel time: 5 hours.
