= V-Train (Korail) =

Tourist train in South Korea

V-Train aka Baekdudaegan Canyon train
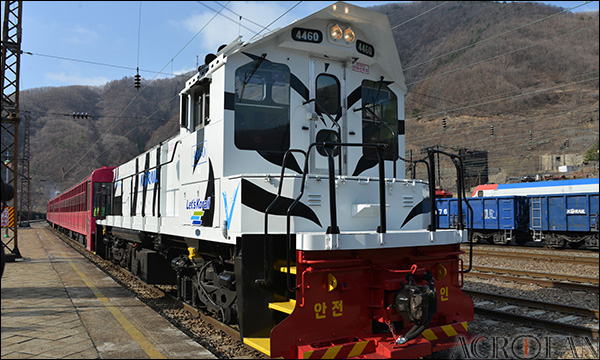

Overview
- Owner: Korail
- Termini: Cheoram Station; Buncheon Station

Service
- Type: Regional rail
- System: Korail
- Services: Yeongdong Line
- Operator: Korail

History
- Opened: April 12, 2013 - present

V-Train (aka Baekdudaegan Canyon train) (Korean: 백두대간협곡열차) is a South Korean sightseeing train operated by Korail. The train began operations in 2013 and transports tourists through the valleys of Baekdu-daegan.

== Overview ==
The train began running on April 12, 2013, passes through the valleys of Baekdudaegan, along the gorge of the Nakdong River and shuttles the 27.7 kilometers back and forth from Cheoram in Gangwon-do, to Buncheon in Gyeongsangbuk-do.

The train has three cars which are retro in style, with a charcoal stove, incandescent lamps, and large windows; and along with the whistle stops, it has an older feel. It travels at an average speed of 30 kilometers per hour in most sections and stops every now and then at photogenic spots.

The letter "V" in the name stems from the V-shaped gorge and the word "valley". The train is a subset of the larger O-Train of Korail's, which connects Seoul Station with Jecheon station then loops around to the V-Train stops, where passengers can switch over.

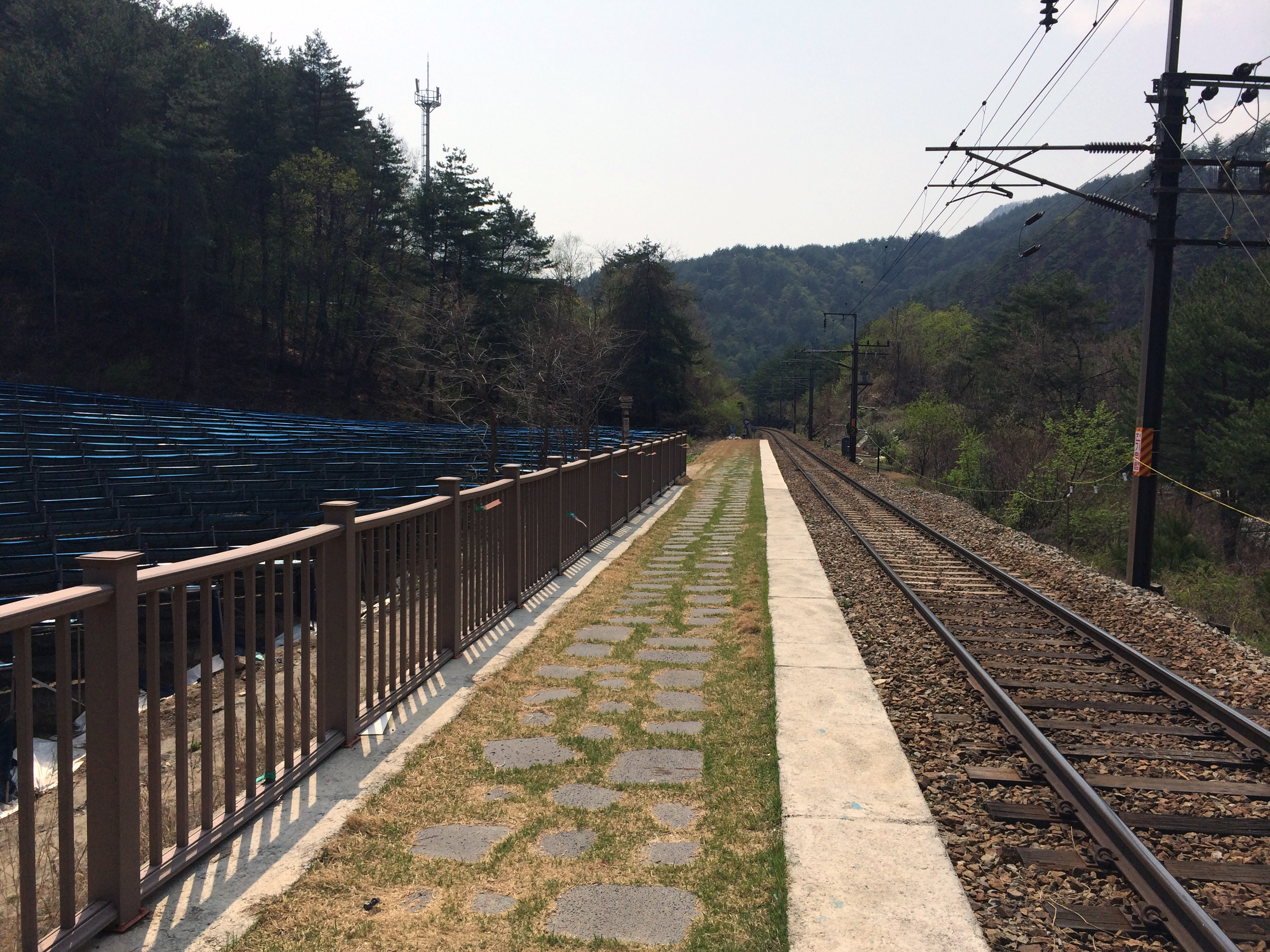
Platform of Bidong Station

The train's Buncheon Station sits on a railway line which first opened in 1955 and was busy with coal transports, until the industry slowed. The two tourist trains, stopping at the station, had 400,000 passengers between April 1 and December 31, 2013, and the sudden influx of tourists boosted the local economy.

During the holidays, the train was given the name "Baekdudaegan Snow Train Bound for the Santa Village."

== Operations ==
- Started running: April 12, 2013
- Stations: Buncheon Station – Bidong Station - Seungbu Station - Cheoram Station
- Approximate travel time: 1 Hour 10 Minutes

== Connections ==
The V-Train connected with the O-Train to and from Seoul Station until it ceased operations in August 2020. The O-Train was succeeded by the Donghae Santa Train which runs from Gangneung to Buncheon via Cheoram. The V-Train is complemented by Korail Mugunghwa-ho trains on the route which provide connections to Donghae and Yeongju.
