= Mungyeong station =

Rail station in South Korea

문경
Mungyeong

Korean name
- Hangul: 문경역
- Hanja: 聞慶驛
- RR: Mungyeong-yeok
- MR: Mun'gyŏng-yŏk

General information
- Location: (415-8 Mawon-ri) 7 Oseo-gil, Mungyeong-eup, Mungyeong, Gyeongsangbuk-do; South Korea
- Operator: Korail
- Lines: Jungbunaeryuk Line; Mungyeong Line
- Platforms: 2
- Tracks: 7

Construction
- Structure type: Aboveground

History
- Opened: June 20, 1969
- Closed: April 1, 1995
- Rebuilt: Nov 30, 2024

Services
Preceding station	Korea Train Express	Following station
Yeonpung towards Pangyo	Jungbunaeryuk KTX	Terminus
Location

Mungyeong Station is a railway station on the Jungbunaeryuk Line and Mungyeong Line in South Korea.

old station ground
