= RailRunner =

RailRunner can refer to:

- New Mexico Rail Runner Express
- RailRunner (company) Inc.
- Railrunner - ticket in the Netherlands
