= Ministry of Transport and Water Management (Netherlands) =

Government ministry of the Netherlands

The Ministry of Transport, Public Works and Water Management (Dutch: Ministerie van Verkeer en Waterstaat; V&W) was a Dutch ministry responsible for water management, public and private transport and infrastructure. It is now part of the Ministry of Infrastructure and Water Management.

== Responsibilities ==
The motto of the ministry was: "familiar with water, progressive with connections". The ministry had two main responsibilities:

- Regulation and management of transport of people and goods via roads, trains, boats and airplanes
- Water management by water works, such as dikes, polders and channels

== Organisation ==
The ministry was headed by one minister and one state secretary. The ministry's main office was located in the centre of The Hague. The civil service was headed by a secretary general and a deputy secretary general, who headed a system of four directorates general:

- Passenger transport
- Freight transport of goods and civil aviation
- Water Affairs
- Public Works and Water Management (Rijkswaterstaat)

There were two autonomous agencies:

- Inspectorate for Transport, Public Works and Water Management
- Royal Netherlands Meteorological Institute

An important other institution involved in water management in the Netherlands are the Water boards, which manage local and regional water works. These are independent institutions chosen by land owners and citizens.

The ministry owned shares in:

- NS Railinfratrust BV (ProRail) (100%)
- Groningen Airport Eelde NV (majority interest)
- NV Luchtvaartterrein Texel (majority interest)
- NV Western Scheldt Tunnel (95,4%)
- Nederlandse Omroep-zendermaatschappij (Nozema) NV (59%)
- NV Luchthaven Maastricht (minority interest)

== History ==
The Ministry of Transport, Public Works and Water Management is one of the oldest in the Netherlands. It was founded in 1809 as the Ministry of Water Management, which existed in several different forms until 1831, when it was integrated into the Ministry of the Interior. In 1877, Water Management, Trade and Industry became a separate ministry again. In 1906 Water Management became a separate ministry. After the World War II, Transport was added to the responsibilities of the ministry.

== Ministers ==
Since 1967 the following politicians have been minister of Transport, Public Works and Water Management:

- Joop Bakker (1967–1971)
- Willem Drees Jr. (1971–1972)
- Berend Jan Udink (1972–1973)
- Tjerk Westerterp (1973–1977)
- Danny Tuijnman (1977–1981)
- Henk Zeevalking (1981–1982)
- Neelie Kroes (1982–1989)
- Hanja Maij-Weggen (1989–1994)
- Koos Andriessen (1994)
- Annemarie Jorritsma (1994–1998)
- Tineke Netelenbos (1998–2002)
- Roelf de Boer (2002–2003)
- Karla Peijs (2002–2007)
- Camiel Eurlings (2007–2010)
