= Weeze station =

Railway station in Weeze, Germany

Weeze
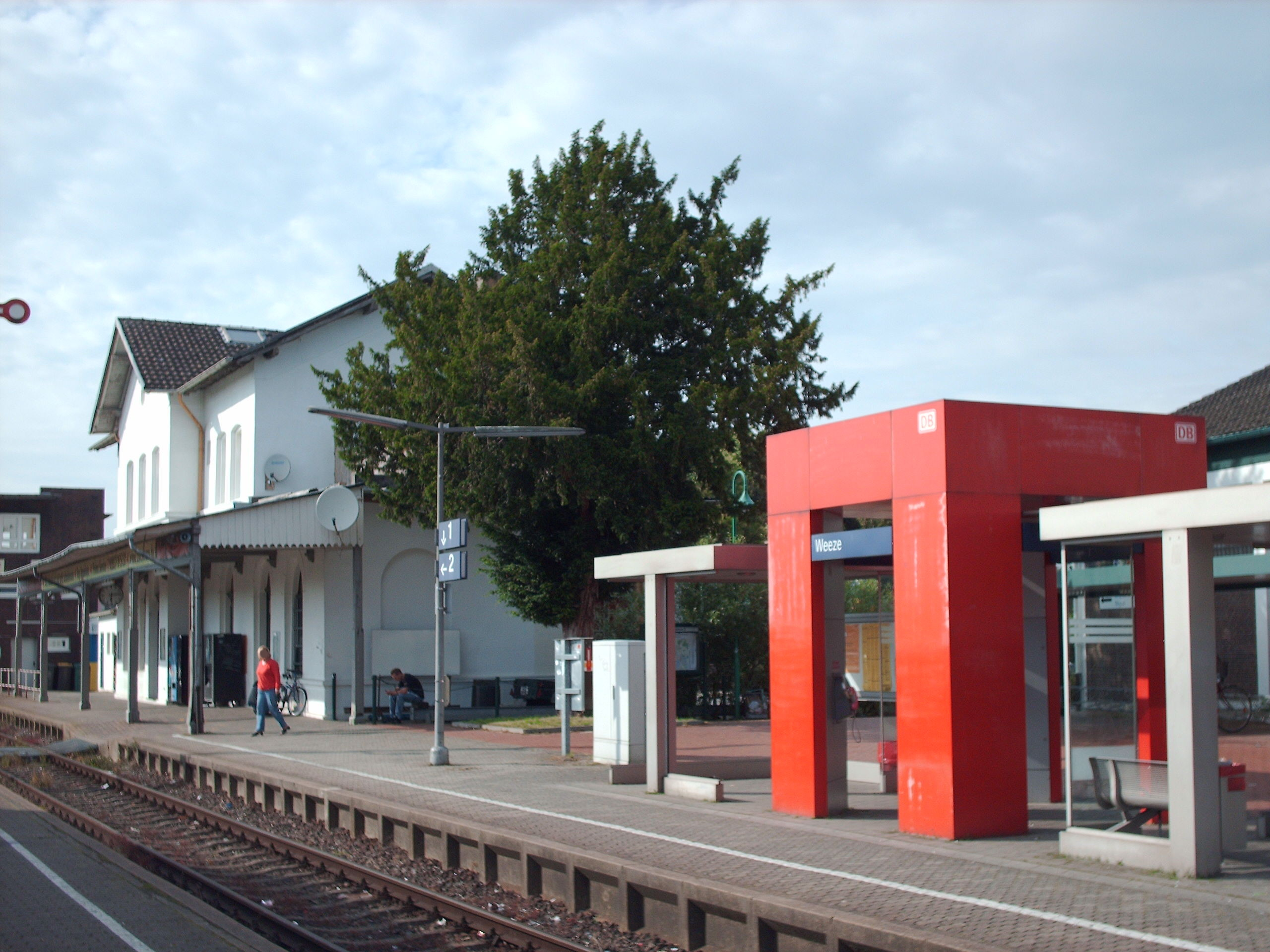
- Weeze station

General information
- Location: Weeze, NRW; Germany
- Coordinates: 51°37′28″N 6°11′50″E
- Line: Lower Left Rhine Railway
- Platforms: 2
- Tracks: 2
- Connections: Bus to Weeze Airport

Construction
- Accessible: Yes

Other information
- Station code: 6579
- Category: 6
- Fare zone: VRR: 867
- Website: www.bahnhof.de

Services
Preceding station	NordWestBahn	Following station
Goch towards Kleve	RE 10	Kevelaer towards Düsseldorf Hbf
Location

Weeze is a railway station in the village of Weeze, North Rhine Westphalia, Germany. The station opened on 5 March 1863 on the Lower Left Rhine Railway. The train services are operated by NordWestBahn.

== Train services ==
The station is served by the following services:

- Regional service RE 10 Kleve - Kevelaer - Krefeld - Düsseldorf

== Bus services ==
An hourly bus service operates between the station and Weeze Airport.
