= Kevelaer station =

Railway station in Kevelaer, Germany

Kevelaer
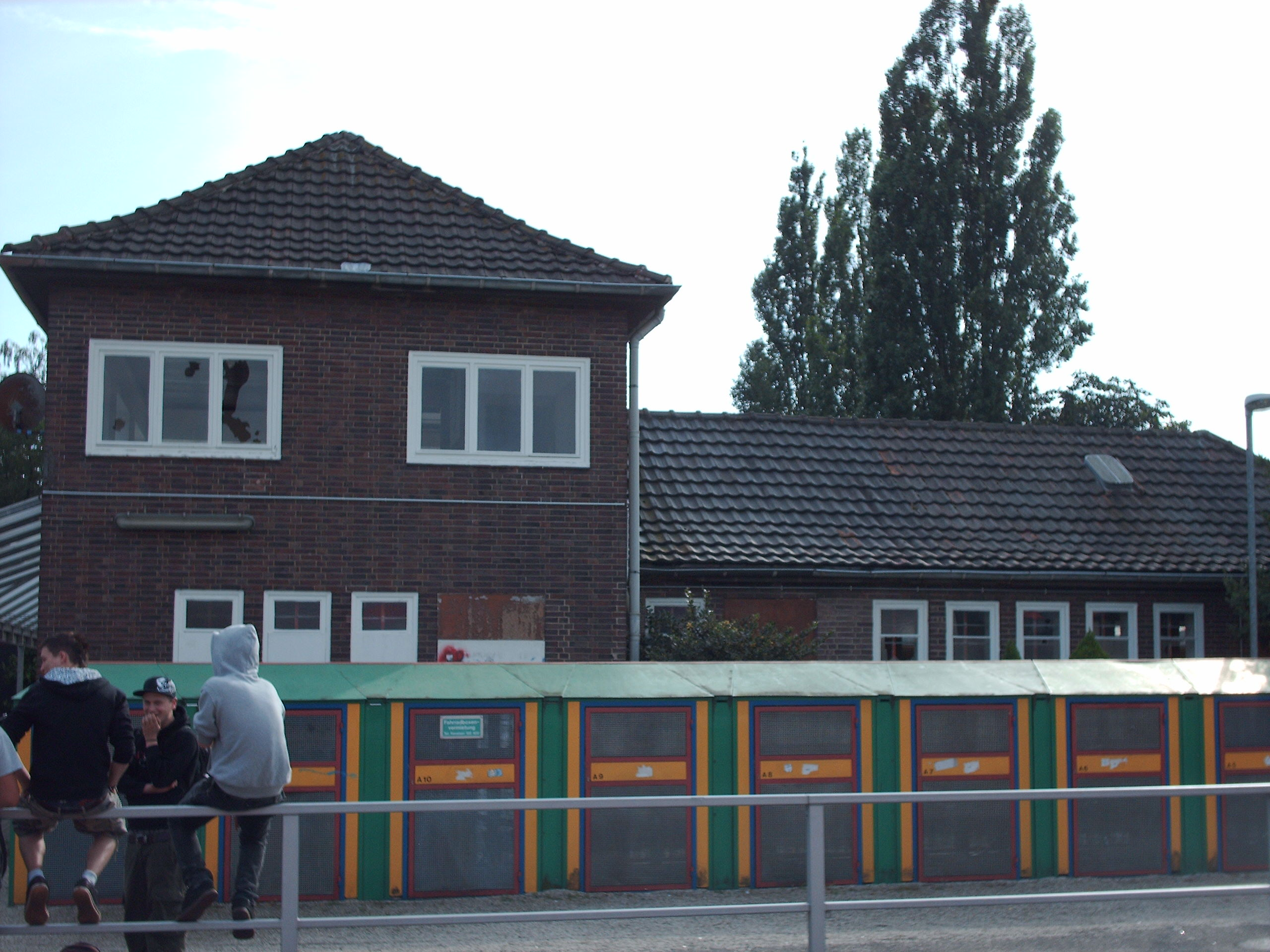
- Kevelaer station

General information
- Location: Kevelaer, North Rhine-Westphalia; Germany
- Coordinates: 51°34′52″N 6°15′06″E
- Line: Lower Left Rhine Railway

Other information
- Station code: 3169
- Category: 5
- Fare zone: VRR: 851

History
- Opened: 5 March 1863

Services
Preceding station	NordWestBahn	Following station
Weeze towards Kleve	RE 10	Geldern towards Düsseldorf Hbf
Location

Kevelaer is a railway station in the town of Kevelaer, North Rhine Westphalia, Germany. The station opened on 5 March 1863 on the Lower Left Rhine Railway. The train services are operated by NordWestBahn.

== Train services ==
The station is served by the following services:

- Regional service RE 10 Kleve - Kevelaer - Krefeld - Düsseldorf

== Bus services ==
A two-hourly bus service (number 73) operates between the station and Weeze Airport.
