= Goch station =

Railway station in Goch, Germany

Goch
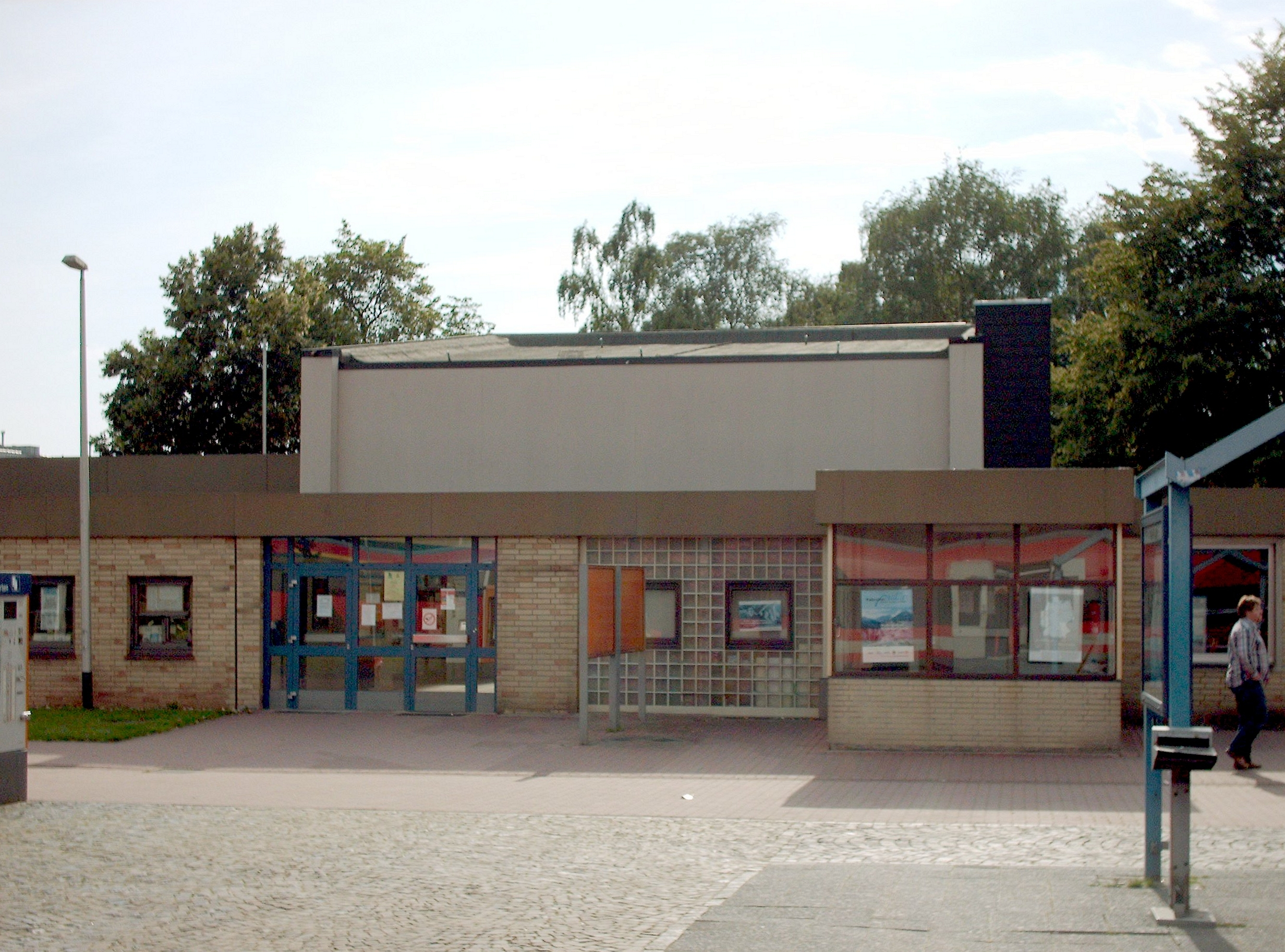
- Goch station

General information
- Location: Goch, North Rhine-Westphalia; Germany
- Coordinates: 51°40′56″N 6°09′39″E
- Line: Lower Left Rhine Railway
- Platforms: 2
- Tracks: 2

Other information
- Station code: 2159
- Category: 6
- Fare zone: VRR: 861

Services
Preceding station	NordWestBahn	Following station
Bedburg-Hau towards Kleve	RE 10	Weeze towards Düsseldorf Hbf
Location

Goch is a railway station in the town of Goch, North Rhine Westphalia, Germany. The station opened on 5 March 1863 on the Lower Left Rhine Railway. The train services are operated by Transdev Rhein-Ruhr GmbH.

== Train services ==
The station is served by the following services:

- Regional service RE 10 Kleve - Kevelaer - Krefeld - Düsseldorf

== Bus services ==
An hourly taxi-bus service operates between the station and Weeze Airport.
