= Public transport in the Netherlands =

The main public transport in the Netherlands for longer distances is by train. Long-distance buses are limited to a few missing railway connections. Regional and local public transport is by bus and in some cities by metro and tram. There are also ferries.

There are 18 public transport authorities in the Netherlands: the Ministry of Infrastructure and Water Management (I&W), OV-bureau Groningen Drenthe (OVBGD), each of the 10 other provinces, Regio Twente, Stadsregio Arnhem Nijmegen, Bestuur Regio Utrecht (BRU), Vervoerregio Amsterdam (formerly Stadsregio Amsterdam), Metropoolregio Rotterdam Den Haag (MRDH), and Samenwerkingsverband Regio Eindhoven (SRE). The I&W issue concessions for regions or specific lines, which grants a company the sole right to transport passengers on a particular line.

The main operators are Nederlandse Spoorwegen (NS), Arriva, Connexxion, Transdev, Syntus, Qbuzz and the local operators GVB, HTM, RET. Qbuzz operates public transport in Utrecht on behalf of Bestuur Regio Utrecht using the trademark U-OV.

Public transport translates as openbaar vervoer in Dutch, which is abbreviated as ov. The abbreviation appears in names related to public transport.

== Modes ==
=== Train ===
Railway tracks for public transport in the Netherlands

Rail transport for public transport is operated mainly by Nederlandse Spoorwegen (NS), minor parts by Arriva, Syntus, Connexxion, DB Regio and Eurobahn. The Dutch rail network is the busiest network in the entire world.

=== Metro ===
Three rapid transit systems currently operate in the Netherlands. Both are largely grade-separated, have standard gauge, 1,435 mm (4 ft 8 1/2 in) track, and use 750 volt DC power supply throughout.

- Amsterdam Metro, serving Amsterdam, Diemen, and Ouder-Amstel, operated by Gemeentelijk Vervoerbedrijf (GVB)
- Rotterdam Metro, serving Rotterdam, Schiedam, Spijkenisse, Albrandswaard, and Capelle aan den IJssel, operated by Rotterdamse Elektrische Tram (RET)
- RandstadRail line E, serving Rotterdam, The Hague and the suburbs in between, running partially on the lines of the Rotterdam Metro and partially shared with tram lines 3 and 4

Both the Amsterdam and Rotterdam networks largely use third rail power supply, but include sections using overhead lines. The RandstadRail metro line E uses third rail in the sections shared with Rotterdam metro trains, but mostly use overhead wires. These sections also have some level crossings (with priority), and could therefore also be called sneltram (light rail) instead of metro; however, they are integrated in the metro system and use vehicles that can switch between both systems.

=== Trams and light rail ===
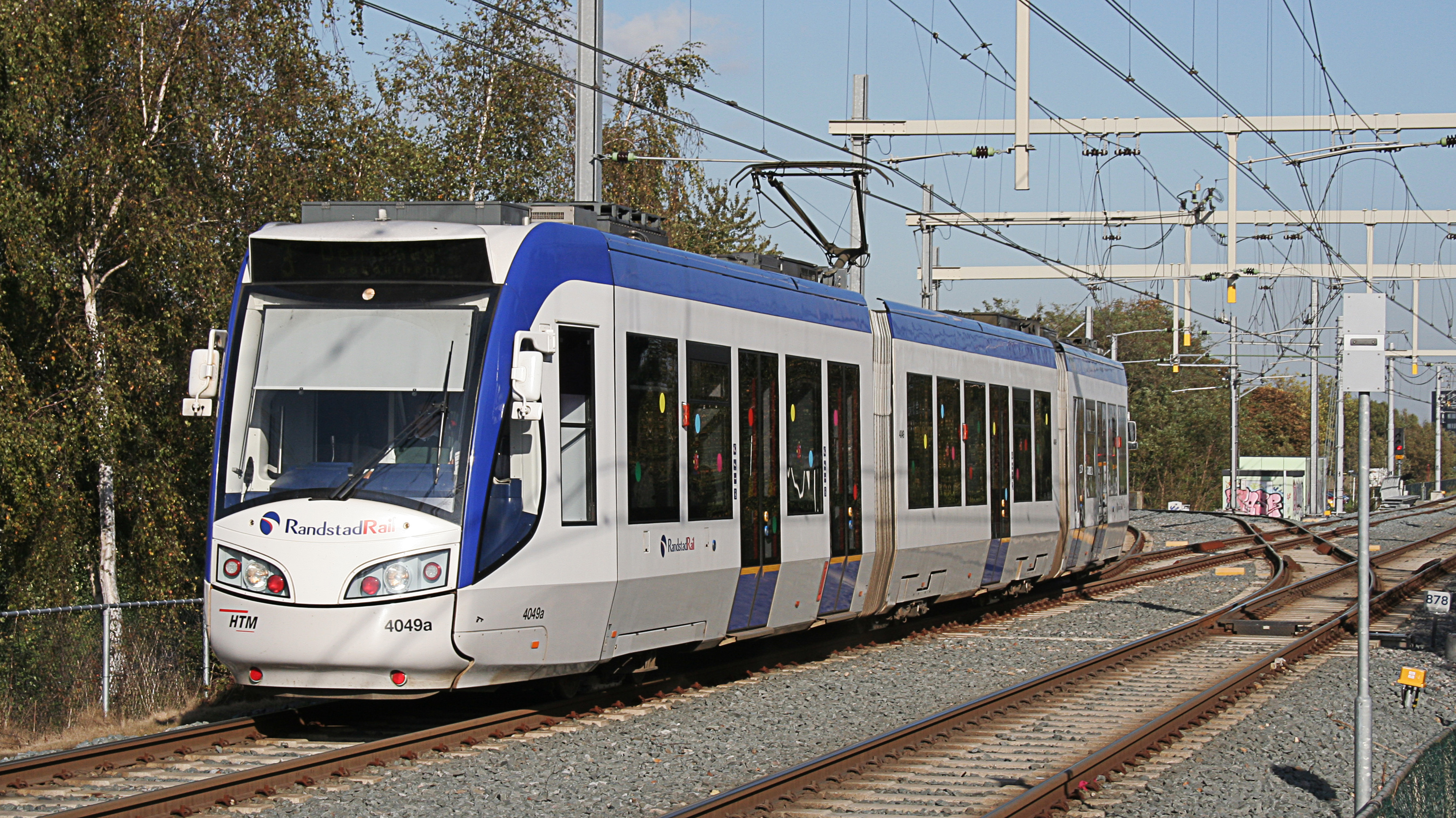
RandstadRail in Zoetermeer

Three cities in the Netherlands operate large tram networks. They all run on standard gauge, 1,435 mm (4 ft 8 1/2 in) track, and use overhead wires electrified at 600 V DC.

- Amsterdam tram network (operated by GVB), serving Amsterdam, Diemen, Amstelveen
- Rotterdam tram network (operated by RET), serving Rotterdam, Schiedam, Vlaardingen, Barendrecht
- The Hague tram network (operated by HTM), serving The Hague, Rijswijk, Leidschendam-Voorburg, Delft, Nootdorp, Wateringen

There are also two light rail networks in the Netherlands. They all run on standard gauge, 1,435 mm (4 ft 8 1/2 in) track, and use overhead wires electrified at 750 V DC.

- Utrecht sneltram (operated by U-OV - Qbuzz), with lines connecting Utrecht Centraal railway station to Nieuwegein, IJsselstein and Uithof
- RandstadRail lines 3 and 4, serving The Hague, Zoetermeer and the suburbs in between, running partially on the lines of the Hague tram network and partially shared with metro line E

In the Netherlands, the only difference between a tram and a light rail line is considered to be that light rail doesn't share its lane with other traffic. Some lines could be partially seen as light rail such as Amsterdam tram line 26, which is only mixed with other traffic on both its balloon loops. However, Amsterdam tram line 25 does not operate in mixed traffic and operates as light rail using bidirectional trams that can be coupled in pairs.

=== Bus ===
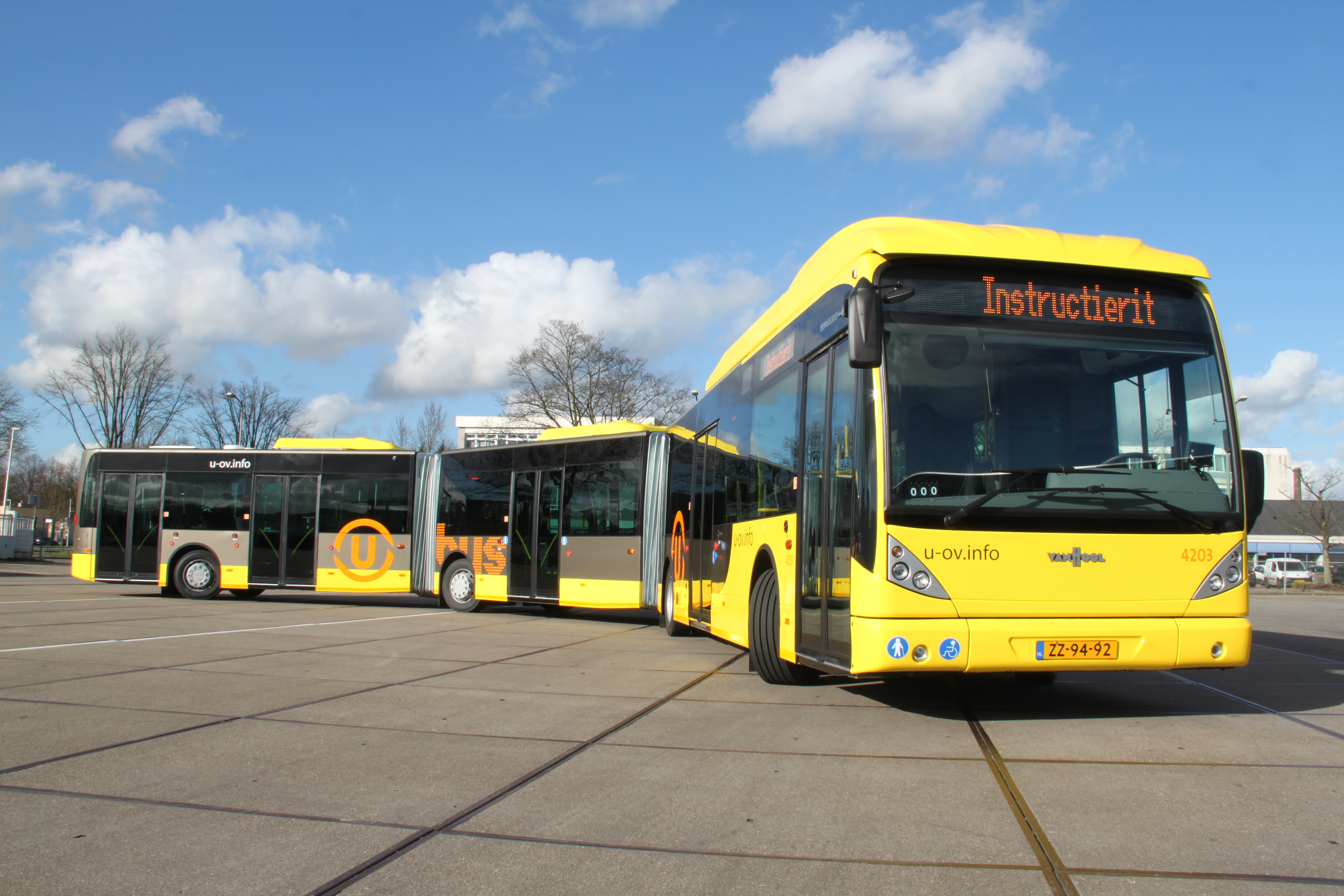
Utrecht runs bi-articulated buses

Both regional and city public transport bus services can be found throughout the country. Because of the extensive rail network, long-distance bus services are limited to a few connections where train connections are missing or would require a considerable detour. In the Randstad area lines with a high frequency and higher average speed have been branded as R-Net.

All bus operations (except for in the cities of Amsterdam, Rotterdam and The Hague) are awarded by a transport authority to companies by a public tender. The concessions can last up to 10 years, with extensions of a few years if the transport authority is satisfied.

Operators include Arriva, Connexxion, GVB, Hermes (including Breng), HTM, Qbuzz, RET, EBS and Syntus.

Arnhem is the only city that still operates trolleybuses and maintains an extensive network.

The Ministry of Infrastructure and the Environment has decided that from 2025 all new buses need to be zero emission. This encourages operators to invest in electric vehicles. In December 2016, the first large electric (non-trolley) bus fleet was launched in Eindhoven, with 43 vehicles, followed in December 2017 by a fleet of 100 vehicles for services around Schiphol Airport.

== R-net ==
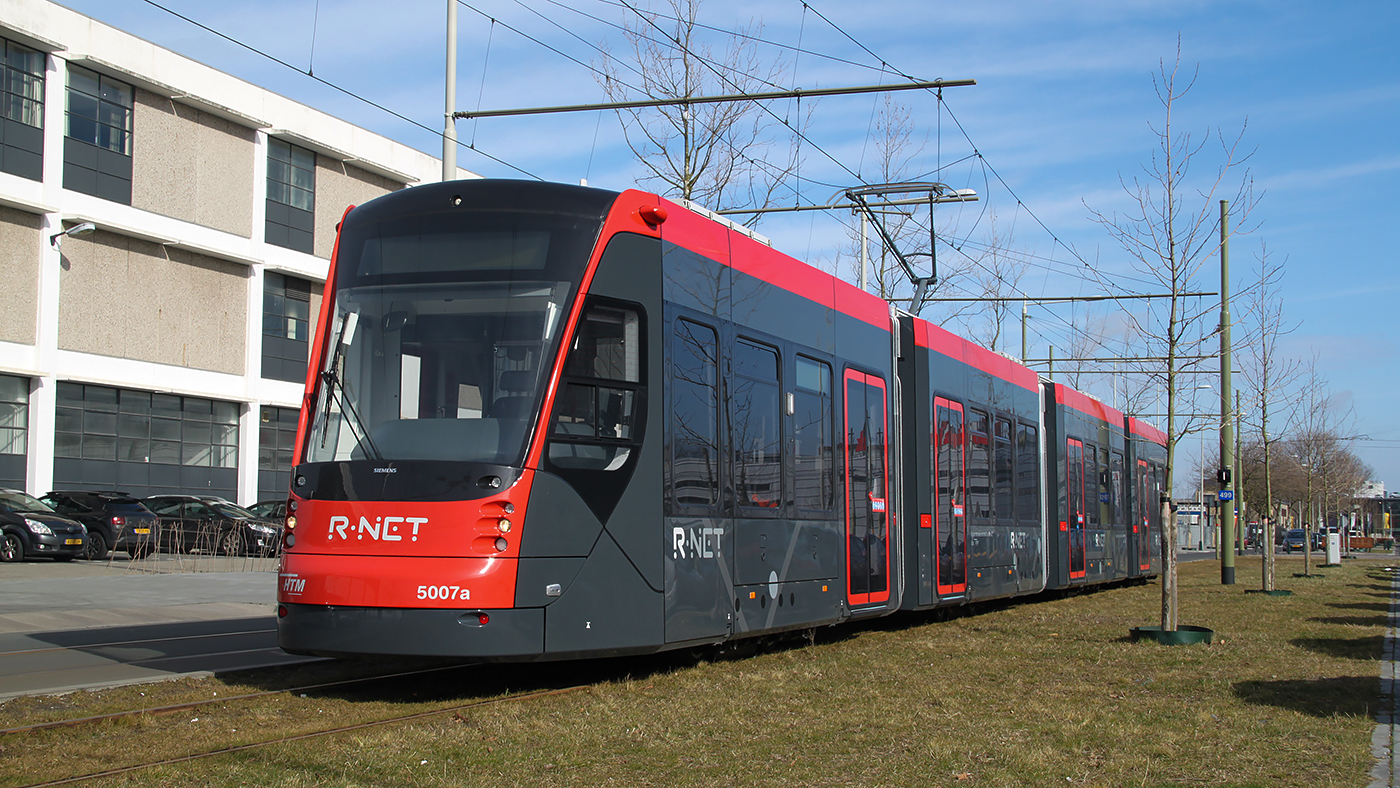
Tram in The Hague in R-net livery

R-net [nl] (or Randstadnet) is a collaborative project of governments and public transport operators providing high-quality public transport in the Randstad area of the Netherlands. Lines in the Randstad area with a high frequency and higher average speed have been branded as R-Net. These lines (be they bus, tram, metro or train) all use the R-net red-grey colour scheme and carry the R-net logo, regardless of the company operating the line.

R-net is an initiative of the cooperating provinces of Flevoland, North Holland and South Holland, plus the Rotterdam–The Hague metropolitan area and Vervoerregio Amsterdam (Amsterdam regional transport). Carriers offering R-net services are Allgobus, Arriva, Connexxion, EBS, GVB, HTM, NS, Qbuzz and RET.

According to its website, R-net requires certain standards to be met. Services must be reliable and punctual, fast, frequent, accessible (e.g. for wheelchairs) and attractive with respect to stop design and comfort. All R-net stops must be fully accessible, and equipped with waiting shelters and digital displays showing real-time travel information. Transfers between R-net services must be quick and easy.

In Amsterdam, Vervoerregio Amsterdam decided to use the R-net livery and logo on all metro trains but on only one tram line (25). The GVB blue-white livery is used on all other Amsterdam tram lines. In the GVB's order for 72 15G trams from CAF, 25 trams have in R-net livery with the remainder in GVB livery.

== Hours of service, and frequency ==
On most lines there is no public transport at night. Services usually start between 5:00 and 7:00 on weekdays, a bit later on Saturdays, and even later than that on Sundays. Apart from quiet, rural lines, most services end just after midnight. Also there is no public transport from 20:00 on New Year's Eve.

There is a night service on some train routes. There are night bus services in a number of cities, but only around Amsterdam services are on all nights, other cities only have services on Thursday, Friday or Saturday nights. Sometimes these run during the first part of the night only, or in one direction only. Night buses usually have separate fares, which are higher than the daytime fares.

From November to March the stretch Hoek van Holland Haven - Hoek van Holland Strand (not on the hoofdrailnet) is served only between 11 am and 4 pm.

Even apart from special rush hour bus lines, some bus lines do not operate on Saturdays, Sundays and/or evenings.

The frequency of domestic trains is at least twice per hour during daytime on weekdays, except on two services by Arriva. Almost all timetables are planned on a clock-face schedule since 1971 and apart from a few regional lines all trains have a symmetry around x:00/x:30 as have neighboring countries. On many lines services are combined to 4x per hour during day or peak times. From December 2017 Intercity services between Amsterdam, Utrecht and Eindhoven are increased to six trains per hour. Zwolle and Zutphen are full hubs, with (almost) all trains arriving and departing around the same time, creating a connection from and to each direction. At the larger stations frequencies are higher and only certain cross-platform transfers are timed.

Metros operate on frequencies of at least 4x per hour, with 6 to 10 trains per hour during day and peak times, but often two lines are combined on busier stretches, increasing the total frequency.

Trams mostly have a frequency of 6x per hour, with less services on late evenings and Sundays, but busy lines can have up to 15 trams per hour.

Buses vary greatly in services, depending on the population density of the area, quality of service and demand for transportation. Rural bus services have typically hourly or half-hourly frequencies, but if a bus line serves multiple important hubs or towns, frequencies can be much higher. In larger cities the frequencies are mostly 4x per hour or more. Line 12 in Utrecht was the busiest bus line in the Netherlands, with up to 30 departures per hour using bi-articulated buses. During peak times there was no fixed frequency, but staff members on the bus platforms monitored the passenger flow and would call a new bus in as soon as the previous bus was filled. As of 15 December 2019 the busline was replaced with the newly built tram 22.

== Information ==
=== Route planners ===
A country-wide public transport route planners for all modes is 9292.

A similar route planner is of NS. However, it does not show any maps, except of the railway stations of departure, transfer, and arrival and their surroundings.

Apart from NS some more operators offer their own route planner, but these may not take other operators into account. Connexxion's route planner produces a map showing the points of departure, transfer and arrival, connected by straight lines.

=== Maps ===
Prorail provides a railway map showing all stations, and showing at a point where lines A, B and C meet whether A splits into B and C, or B into A and C etc. NS provides a schematic railway map with all railways for public transport, not showing at a point where lines A, B and C meet whether A splits into B and C, or B into A and C etc., so it does not show whether a train has to reverse direction when going from A to B etc. There is also a dynamic version showing disruptions and a version with indications of routes of train series, with their frequencies and stops.

Common varieties of bus route maps include:

- map showing bus network, with only a selection of stops
- map showing bus network, with all stops
- small map showing the route of a single bus line, with all stops

The first two types also clearly show railways and all railway stations. Highways are shown, but characteristic of these maps is that they are shown unobtrusively. The maps are provided as pdf-file of up to 7MB. For some pdf-viewers on smartphones this may be rather large. In that case a workaround is to create submaps with PrintScreen. Since the regular pdf-viewer allows any choice of zoom level, any selection of the map, and the full-screen modus, this allows the creation of submaps with the maximum of information that fits on the screen.

Some operators only provide dynamic maps which cannot be directly downloaded. A workaround is downloading detail maps one by one (if necessary produced by PrintScreen), but, more than making submaps from a large pdf-file as mentioned above, this is a cumbersome procedure and results in a large collection of small detail maps without convenient navigation between them. (Even more cumbersome but with a better result is to paste groups of these small maps together.)

The route planners do not provide in their results links to any of these route maps, these maps have to be looked up separately.

=== Timetables ===
Public transport timetables are partly available.

==== Train ====
The Spoorboekje is a collection of time tables in the form of pdf files, covering a year, but with intermediate renewal when needed (the physical timetable book was abolished in December 2010). It covers all operators of rail transport in the Netherlands, except those of heritage railways; it gives the departure times (and sometimes arrival times), but not the tracks. For international trains to and from the Netherlands, for the data for the parts abroad only a summary is given.

It provides tables with services in columns, arranged by timetable number and direction (a and b). A train route can involve multiple timetable numbers; an equal train service number indicates that columns in two tables refer to the same train.

For train services which do not operate daily throughout the year there are footnotes explaining the whole set of days of the year on which it operates.

Since a few years, the website treinreiziger.nl gives out a private timetable for the Netherlands. These are available online and at some station shops.

==== Bus, tram and metro ====
PDF files with timetables (sometimes many small files, sometimes a few large ones) are available on the sites of several operators. The tables are arranged similarly to the Spoorboekje, except that for each line and direction there are three separate tables: for Monday-Friday, for Saturday, and for Sunday. Also, they show the times for selected stops only. Some operators only provide for reading the tables on the screen, not for downloading them. A workaround is using PrintScreen, but this is cumbersome if one wants to download many pages. In at least one case the pdf file is apparently prepared for being printed only, not for reading from the screen: the tables are rotated. Not only are some screens not easy to rotate, also the tables are often wider than high, like a screen, making rotation less desirable. Thus every time the file is loaded the rotate function has to be applied.

Also paper leaflets or small booklets with the timetable of a single line or a few lines are often available free of charge, and larger booklets are often for sale.

== Toilets ==
Most trains and some ferries have a toilet, while buses, trams and metros do not. See also toilets in trains in the Netherlands and hoofdrailnet.

== See also ==
- Transport in the Netherlands
- Train routes in the Netherlands
- Railway stations in the Netherlands
- Trains in the Netherlands
- Transportation in Europe
