= Weeze Airport =

Airport in North Rhine-Westphalia, Germany

Weeze Airport Flughafen Weeze/Niederrhein

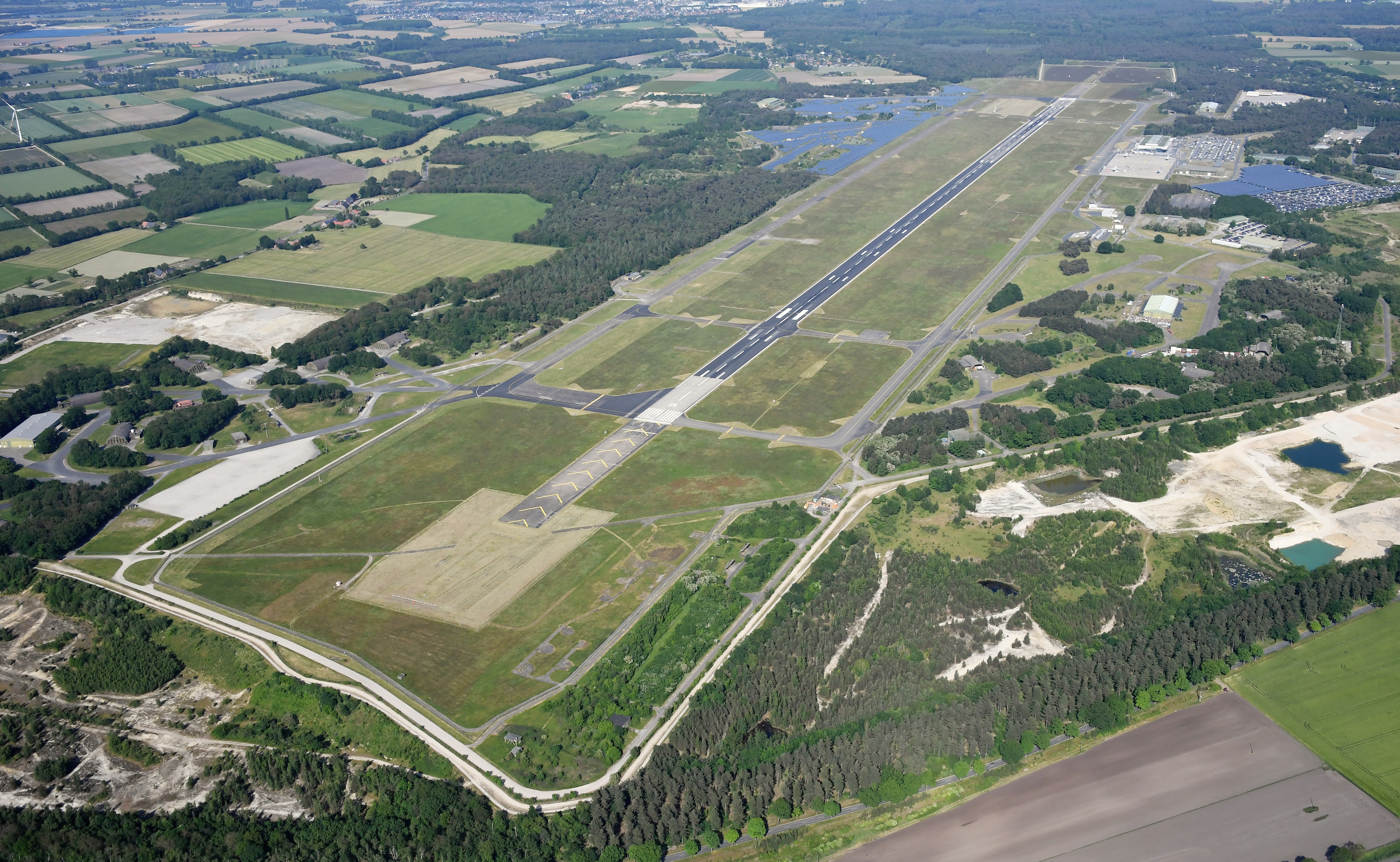
- IATA: NRN; ICAO: EDLV

Summary
- Airport type: Public
- Operator: Flughafen Niederrhein GmbH
- Serves: Kreis Kleve and Nijmegen
- Location: Weeze, North Rhine-Westphalia, Germany
- Opened: May 2003; 23 years ago
- Operating base for: Ryanair
- Elevation AMSL: 106 ft (32 m)
- Coordinates: 51°36′09″N 006°08′32″E
- Website: www.airport-weeze.com

Map
- Location within North Rhine-Westphalia Location within Germany

Runways
Direction	Length		Surface
Direction	m	ft	Surface
09/27	2,440	8,005	Asphalt concrete

Statistics (2025)
- Passengers: 2,245,735 ▲+13.97%
- Aircraft movements: 15,533 ▲+68,6%
- Cargo (metric tons): 0 0,0%
- Sources: Statistics at ADV; AIP at German air traffic control.

Weeze Airport (IATA: NRN, ICAO: EDLV), less commonly known as Niederrhein Airport and sometimes marketed as Düsseldorf-Weeze, is a minor international airport in the Lower Rhine region of Germany. It is used by Ryanair. The airport is situated 3.7 km (2.3 mi) southwest of the municipality of Weeze (German pronunciation: [ˈveːtsə]) and 7 km (4.3 mi) northwest of Kevelaer, about 33 km (21 mi) southeast of the Dutch city of Nijmegen, and 48 km (30 mi) northwest of the German city of Duisburg.

== History ==
=== Foundation and early years ===
The airport uses the facilities of the former military airbase RAF Laarbruch, and began operating as a civilian airport in 2003. There is also a large fire department training facility on the airport grounds. Its IATA code is NRN because of its official name Flughafen Niederrhein.

The airport has had several different names in its history as a civilian airport. The operators originally wanted to name it after the city of Düsseldorf, but the significant distance of 83 km (52 mi) to that city, which already had two closer international airports (Düsseldorf Airport as well as Cologne Bonn Airport), resulted in the name being blocked by a court ruling in 2016 that such a description would be likely to mislead passengers. However, Ryanair still refers to it as "Düsseldorf-Weeze". Compared to Düsseldorf, the airport is actually closer to the Dutch cities of Venlo, Nijmegen and Arnhem, the German cities of Duisburg and Essen, and the immediate Weeze area.

Weeze was served by the short-lived, Dutch low-cost carrier V Bird, which opened a base here and operated flights to Berlin, Munich and several international destinations, from its inception in 2003 until bankruptcy in 2004. During this time, passenger numbers doubled from 200,000 to 400,000 within a year. Between 2008 and 2013, this was one of Germany's fastest-growing airports.

=== Development since 2010 ===
After peaking at nearly three million passengers in 2010, Weeze Airport began experiencing a steady decline in throughput, partially due to stiff competition from neighboring airports such as Eindhoven and Dortmund. In February 2014, Ryanair announced the cancellation of 18 routes from Weeze for the 2014 summer season, citing a lack of aircraft.

In 2019, the airport faced severe financial difficulties due to a fall in passenger numbers by 30 percent over the previous year as a result of the cancellation of several Ryanair routes. This was best exemplified by the cancellation of the London-Stansted route, which was one of the most popular destinations from Weeze airport for most of the 2000s and early 2010s.

After passenger numbers collapsed during the COVID-19 pandemic, Weeze Airport has experienced a minor resurgence in popularity, driven by Ryanair's introduction of several new routes and the re-emergence of many destinations. In 2025, Weeze airport welcomed over two million passengers for the first time in over a decade.

== Facilities ==
Weeze Airport has one passenger terminal building with restaurants, shops, and check-in facilities. The apron, which is to the west of the terminal building, features nine aircraft stands for mid-sized aircraft such as the Boeing 737-800. As there are no jet bridges due to the location of the apron to the west side of the terminal building instead in front of it, bus-boarding is used for six stands. Only three stands are close enough to the terminal to be accessed on foot.

== Airlines and destinations ==
The following airlines operate regular scheduled and seasonal flights at Weeze Airport:

Airlines	Destinations
Ryanair	Agadir, Alicante, Bari, Castellón, Crotone, Edinburgh, Essaouira, Faro, Fès, Fuerteventura, Girona, Málaga, Marrakesh, Nador, Olsztyn-Mazury, Oujda, Palma de Mallorca, Paphos, Rabat, Seville, Tangier, Tenerife–South, Thessaloniki, Tirana, Zagreb; Seasonal: Ancona, Béziers, Cagliari, Chania, Corfu, Dubrovnik, Ibiza, Kos, Milan Bergamo, Pescara, Porto, Pula, Reus, Rhodes, Sarajevo, Trapani, Zadar
Sky Express	Seasonal charter: Heraklion
SunExpress	Antalya (begins 23 April 2027)

The nearest larger international airport is Düsseldorf Airport, located 77 km (48 mi) southeast of Weeze Airport.

== Statistics ==
Direct flight destinations from Weeze Airport (Apr 2026)

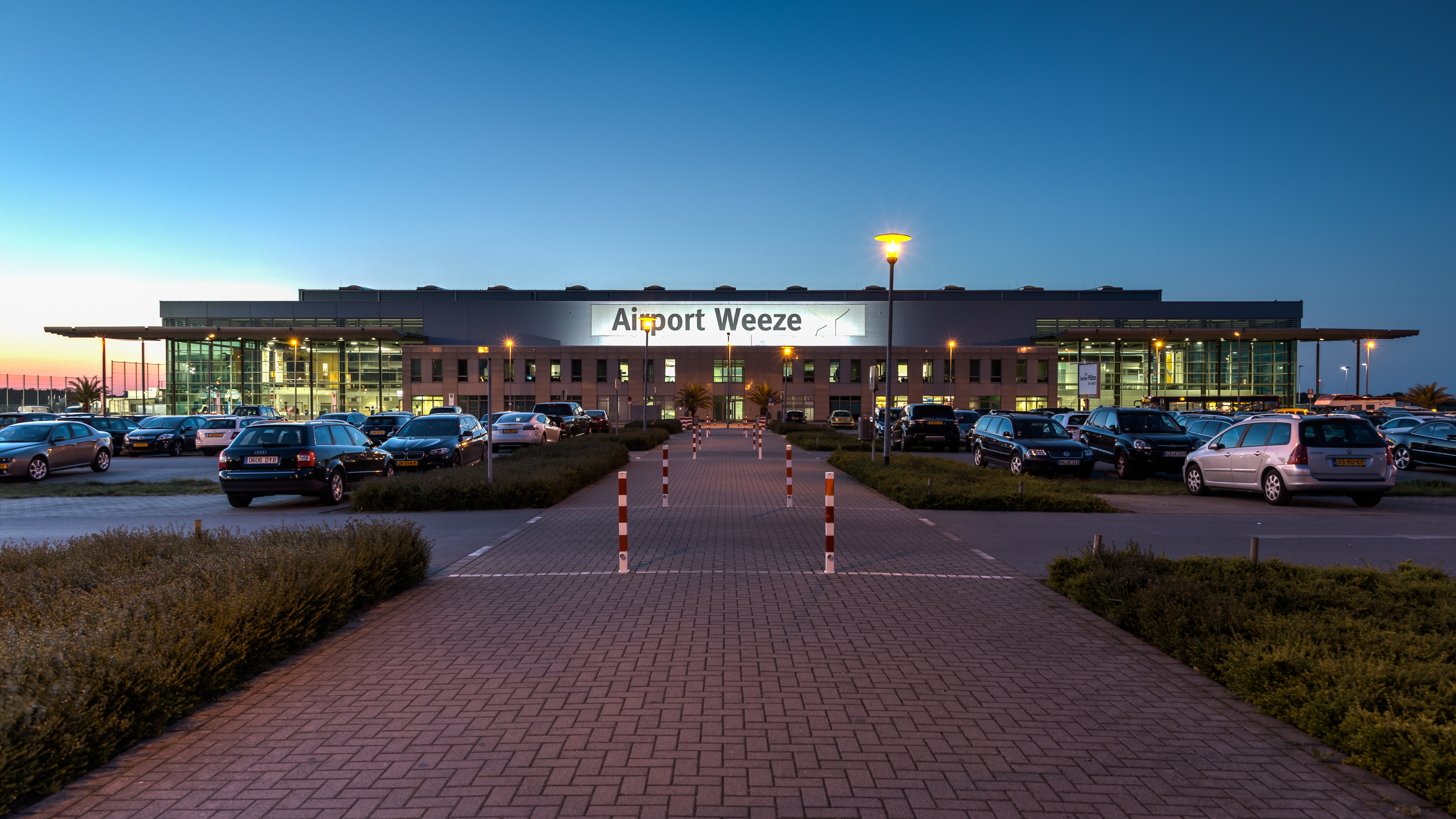
Terminal exterior

	Passengers
2008	1,523,990
2009	▲2,402,083
2010	▲2,896,730
2011	▼2,421,108
2012	▼2,208,429
2013	▲2,487,843
2014	▼1,807,543
2015	▲1,909,704
2016	▼1,854,108
2017	▲1,885,811
2018	▼1,700,711
2019	▼1,231,100
2020	▼299,711
2021	▲587,478
2022	▲1,030,000
2023	▲1,595,785
2024	▲1,970,431
2025	▲2,245,735
^{Source: ADV}

2.245.735

== Ground transportation ==
=== Coach ===
Direct buses serve Düsseldorf Main Station up to 7 times a day, also covering early flight departures and late arrivals. The journey takes 1h 15min. Airexpressbus offered from June 2007 until spring 2017 a service between Weeze Airport and Amsterdam with stops at Eindhoven Airport, Utrecht and 's-Hertogenbosch.

=== Train ===
Bus shuttles serve the railway stations of Weeze, Kevelaer and Goch on a frequent basis. Travellers for Düsseldorf Main Station will need to catch a bus or taxi to either Weeze or Kevelaer railway stations.

=== Buses ===
In addition to coaches serving Düsseldorf, Weeze airport is served by local buses connecting it to most towns in the Lower Rhine region (Kleve, Emmerich, Goch, Geldern) and to Nijmegen in the Netherlands.

== See also ==
- Transport in Germany
- List of airports in Germany
