= RailRunner (company) =

RailRunner N.A., Inc.
- Type: Private
- Founded: 1996
- Headquarters: Lincoln, Massachusetts, USA
- Website: www.railrunner.com

RailRunner N.A., Inc. is a company that designs and produces rail vehicles (bogies) as well as specialized chassis and trailers that allow trailers and cargo containers to be shipped on rail as well as road, thus achieving intermodal transport.

RailRunner has positioned their technology as a freight transportation alternative that is comparable in service but decreases fuel and carbon usage, as rail traffic consumes less energy per distance traveled than road traffic.

The technology is being evaluated in multiple markets, including Africa, Europe, and India, where less established transportation networks make intermodal transport more important.
