= Train routes in the Netherlands =

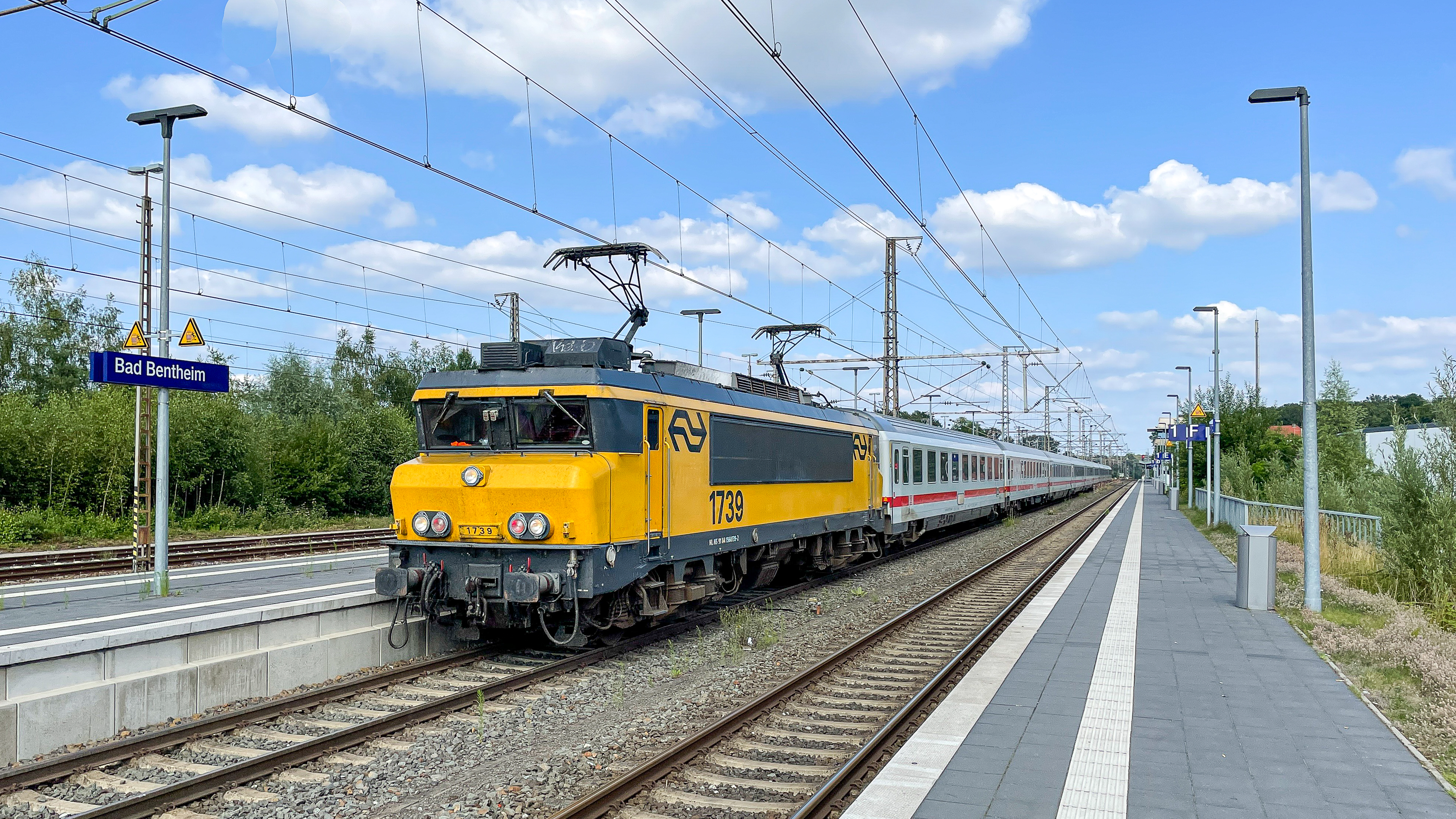
NS 1739 with IC 144 departing Bad Bentheim for Amsterdam Central

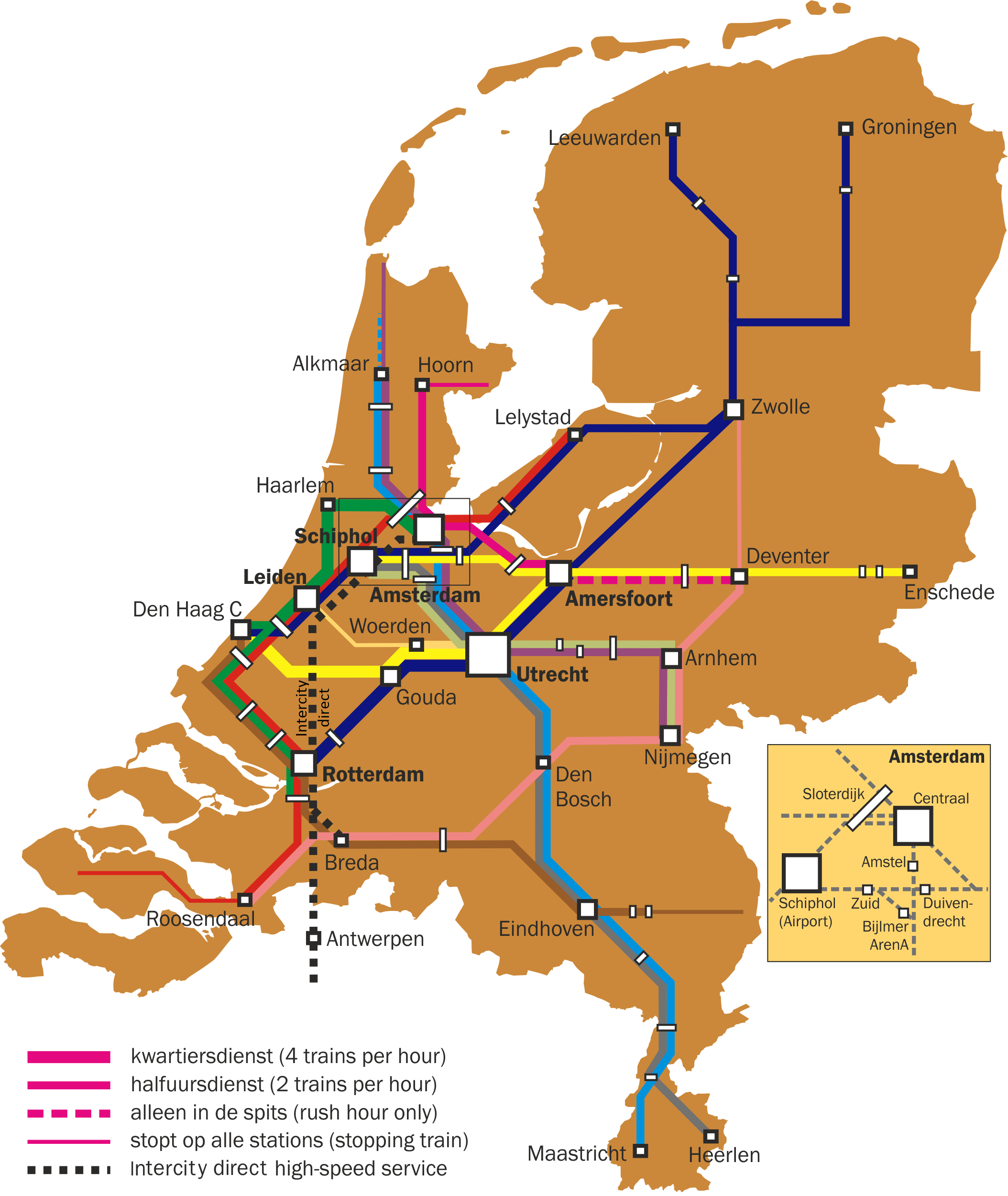
Intercity services.

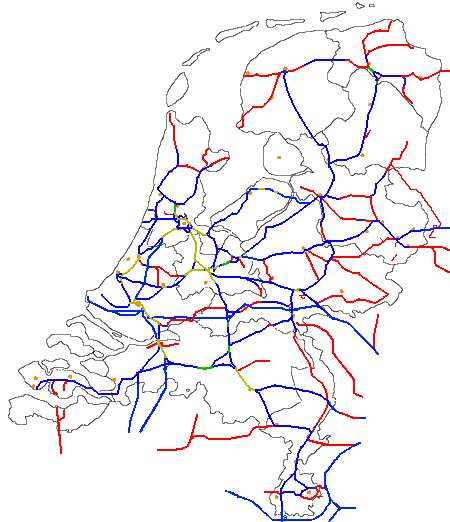
Railway network. Number of tracks:1=red, 2=blue, 3=green, 4=yellow.

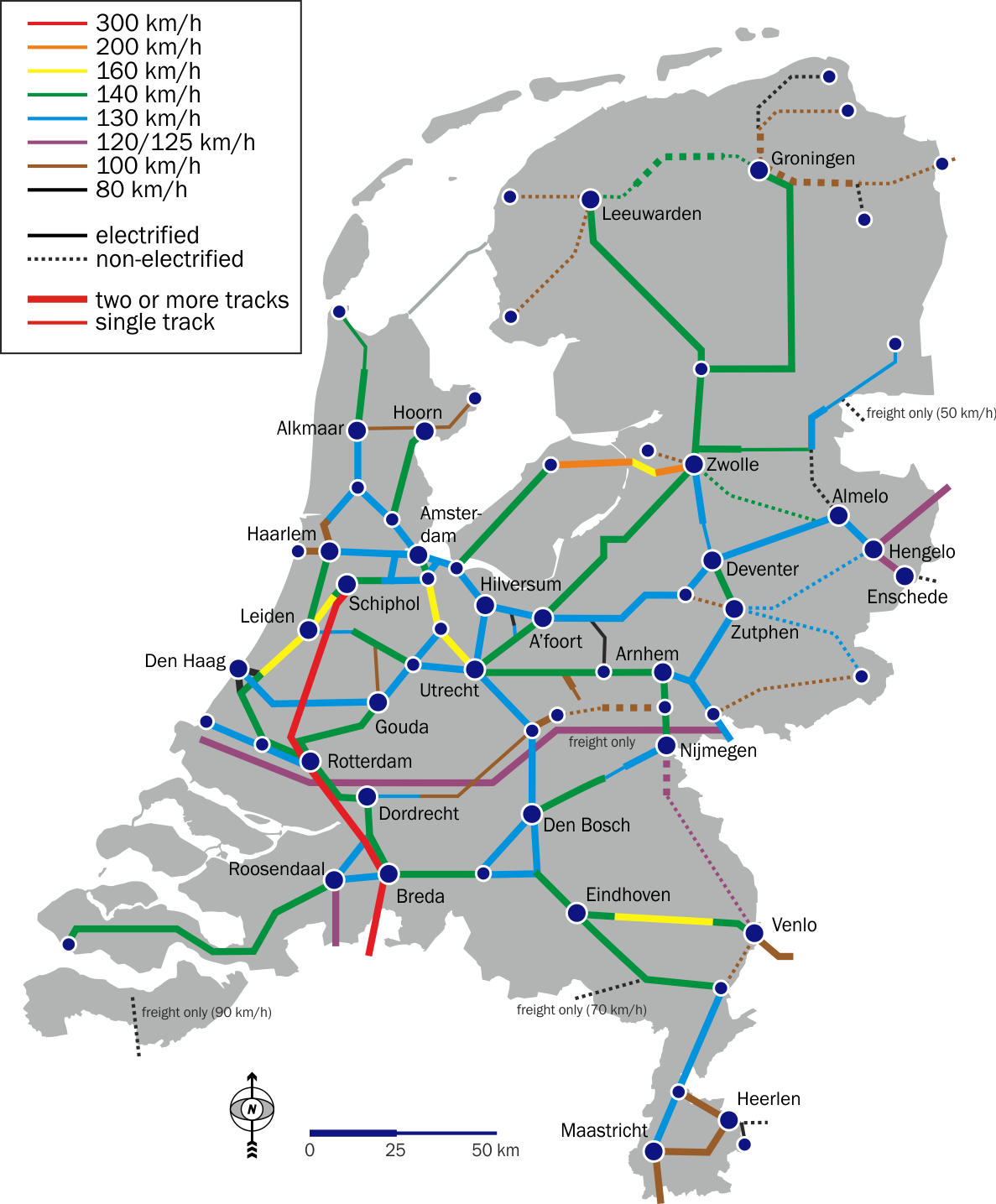
Maximum speeds on the railway network.

The following list highlights existing train routes in the Netherlands. A list of all active train stops and stations can be found on Dutch Railway Services.

== Train number series ==
The following Table shows train routes in the Netherlands as of 2011, along with the corresponding train series number. Please note that this information may be outdated.

Dutch train services
Series	Type	Frequency	Route	Operator	Remarks
1100	Intercity	2x/hour	Den Haag Centraal - Eindhoven Centraal	NS	
11400	Intercity	1x/hour	Rotterdam Centraal - Schiphol Airport - Utrecht Centraal	NS	Night network. Only runs on Wednesday nights.
11450	Intercity	1x/hour	Leiden Centraal - Amsterdam Bijlmer ArenA	NS	Night network. Only runs on Tuesday nights.
11800	Intercity direct	1x/day	Rotterdam Centraal → Amsterdam Zuid	NS	Surcharge for Schiphol - Rotterdam.
120	ICE International	5-6x/day	Frankfurt (M) Hbf - Amsterdam Centraal	NS International	Carries line numbers ICE 43 or ICE 78 in Germany.
12400	Intercity direct	1-2x/hour	Amsterdam Zuid - Rotterdam Centraal	NS	Surcharge for Schiphol - Rotterdam.
12900	Intercity	1x/day	Enkhuizen → Amsterdam Centraal	NS	
13800	Express train	2x/hour	Zwolle - Coevorden (- Emmen)	Arriva	Only runs during rush hours.
1400	Intercity	1x/hour	Rotterdam Centraal - Amsterdam Centraal - Utrecht Centraal	NS	Night network.
140	Intercity	1x/2 hours	Amsterdam Centraal - Berlin Ostbahnhof	NS International	
14400	Sprinter	2x/day	Eindhoven Centraal → Deurne	NS	
14800	Sprinter	1x/day	Uitgeest → Amsterdam Centraal	NS	
1500	Intercity	2x/hour	Amsterdam Centraal - Amersfoort Centraal (- Deventer)	NS	
16700	Sprinter	1x/day	Utrecht Centraal → Tiel	NS	
1700	Intercity	2x/hour	Enschede - Den Haag Centraal	NS	
17800	Local train	1-2x/hour	Zutphen - Apeldoorn	Arriva	
17900	Intercity	1x/hour	Zwolle - Enschede	Keolis Nederland	Only runs on weekdays during the day.
1800	Intercity direct	2x/hour	Amersfoort Schothorst - Schiphol Airport - Breda	NS	Surcharge for Schiphol - Rotterdam.
18900	Express train	1-2x/hour	Liège-Guillemins - Maastricht - Aachen Hbf	Arriva	Runs in Belgium as S43.
19500	Intercity direct	1-2x/hour	Lelystad Centrum - Rotterdam Centraal	NS	Surcharge for Schiphol - Rotterdam.
20000	Regional-Express	1x/hour	Arnhem Centraal/Bocholt - Düsseldorf Hbf	VIAS Rail	Merging and splitting at Wesel.
20050	Regional-Express	1x/hour	Venlo - Hamm Hbf	Eurobahn	Only runs between Venlo and Düsseldorf Hbf late in the evening.
20200	Local train	1x/hour	Enschede - Münster Hbf	DB Regio NRW	
20250	Local train	1x/hour	Enschede - Dortmund Hbf	DB Regio NRW	Runs twice an hour between Lünen and Dortmund on weekdays during the day.
20350	Local train	1x/hour	Hengelo - Bielefeld Hbf	Eurobahn	Does not stop at Hengelo Oost.
2100	Intercity	2x/hour	Den Haag Centraal - Amsterdam Centraal	NS	
21400	Intercity	1-2x/night	Eindhoven Centraal - Utrecht Centraal	NS	Night network. Only runs on Friday and Saturday nights.
21410	Intercity	1-2x/night	Rotterdam Centraal - Eindhoven Centraal	NS	Night network. Only runs on Friday and Saturday nights.
21420	Intercity	1x/night	Tilburg - 's-Hertogenbosch	NS	Night network. Only runs on Friday and Saturday nights.
21430	Intercity	1-2x/night	Utrecht Centraal - Nijmegen	NS	Night network. Only runs on Friday and Saturday nights.
21440	Intercity	1-2x/night	Utrecht Centraal - Amersfoort Centraal	NS	Night network. Only runs on Friday and Saturday nights.
21460	Intercity	2x/night	Amsterdam Centraal - Haarlem	NS	Night network. Only runs on Friday and Saturday nights.
21470	Intercity	1x/night	Amsterdam Centraal - Alkmaar	NS	Night network. Only runs on Friday and Saturday nights.
2200	Intercity	1-2x/hour	Amsterdam Centraal - Vlissingen	NS	
220	ICE International	2-3x/day (per direction)	(München Hbf -) Frankfurt (M) Hbf - Amsterdam Centraal	NS International	
2300	Intercity	1x/hour	Amsterdam Centraal - Vlissingen	NS	Only runs on weekdays during the day.
2400	Intercity direct	1-2x/hour	Lelystad Centrum - Rotterdam Centraal	NS	Surcharge for Schiphol - Rotterdam.
240	Intercity	1x/2 hours	Amsterdam Centraal - Berlin Ostbahnhof	NS International	
2500	Local train	1x/hour	Roosendaal - Puurs	NMBS	
2600	Intercity	2x/hour	Almere Centrum - Amsterdam Centraal	NS	
2700	Intercity	2x/hour	(Den Helder -) Alkmaar - Maastricht	NS	Only runs between Alkmaar and Amsterdam Centraal from Friday to Sunday.
2800	Intercity	2x/hour	Rotterdam Centraal - Utrecht Centraal	NS	
28300	Sprinter	1x/hour	Utrecht Centraal - Utrecht Maliebaan	NS	Does not run on Mondays.
2900	Intercity	2x/hour	Enkhuizen - Maastricht	NS	Only runs in the evening and from Friday to Sunday.
3000	Intercity	2x/hour	Nijmegen - Den Helder	NS	Stops at Veenendaal-De Klomp after 19:00. Stops at Amsterdam Bijlmer ArenA after 23:15.
30400	Express train	1x/hour	(Winterswijk -) Zutphen - Apeldoorn	Arriva	Only runs in the evenings and on weekends.
30700	Local train	2x/hour	Arnhem Centraal - Doetinchem	Hermes	Only runs on weekdays during the day.
30800	Local train	2x/hour	Winterswijk - Zutphen	Arriva	
30900	Local train	2x/hour	Arnhem Centraal - Winterswijk	Arriva	
31000	Local train	1-2x/hour	Hardenberg - Almelo	Arriva	
3100	Intercity	2x/hour	Nijmegen - Schiphol Airport - Den Haag Centraal	NS	Stops at Veenendaal-De Klomp from Friday to Sunday until 19:00.
31100	Local train	2x/hour	Arnhem Centraal - Tiel	Arriva	Does not stop at Arnhem Zuid.
31200	Local train	2x/hour	Oldenzaal - Zutphen	Arriva	
31300	Sprinter	2x/hour	Amersfoort Centraal - Ede-Wageningen	Keolis Nederland	
31400	Sprinter	2x/hour	Amersfoort Centraal - Barneveld Zuid	Keolis Nederland	Only runs Monday-Saturday during the day.
32000	Local train	2x/hour	Maastricht Randwyck - Kerkrade Centrum	Arriva	Sometimes runs as train series 35000.
35000	Local train	1-3x/day	Heerlen → Maastricht Randwyck	Arriva	A few trips instead of train series 32000.
3200	Intercity	0-2x/hour	Arnhem Centraal - Schiphol Airport - Rotterdam Centraal	NS	Only runs from Monday to Thursday until 19:00.
32200	Local train	2x/hour	Nijmegen - Roermond	Arriva	
32300	Local train	2x/hour	Nijmegen - Venray (- Venlo)	Arriva	A few trips start/end in Blerick or Venlo.
32400	Local train	2x/hour	Maastricht Randwyck - Roermond	Arriva	
32500	Local train	2x/hour	Heerlen - Sittard	Arriva	
32710	Night train	1x/week	Maastricht - Schiphol Airport	Arriva	Only runs on Friday nights.
32740	Night train	2x/week	Zwolle - Schiphol Airport	Arriva	Runs from March 14, 2025. Only runs on Friday and Saturday nights.
32780	Night train	1x/week	Groningen - Schiphol Airport	Arriva	Only runs on Friday nights.
3400	Intercity	2x/hour	Haarlem - Alkmaar	NS	Rush hour train Mon-Thu.
3500	Intercity	2x/hour	Dordrecht - Schiphol Airport - Venlo	NS	
3600	Intercity	2x/hour	Roosendaal - Zwolle	NS	
36900	Local train	1x/hour	Arnhem Centraal → Terborg	Arriva	Only runs on Sunday mornings.
37000	Local train	1x/hour	Leeuwarden - Sneek	Arriva	
3700	Intercity	0-2x/hour	Enkhuizen - Amsterdam Centraal	NS	Rush hour train, not on Friday.
37100	Local train	1x/hour	Leeuwarden - Stavoren	Arriva	
37200	Local train	2x/hour	Leeuwarden - Harlingen Haven	Arriva	
37300	Express train	2x/hour	Leeuwarden - Groningen	Arriva	Does not run between Groningen and Groningen Europapark until July 13, 2025.
37400	Local train	2x/hour	Leeuwarden - Groningen (- Groningen Europapark)	Arriva	Did not run between Groningen and Groningen Europapark until July 13, 2025.
37500	Local train	1x/hour	Groningen - Winschoten - Bad Nieuweschans	Arriva	Until July 13, 2025, a few trips start/end in Winschoten. Only runs on Sundays from July 13, 2025.
37600	Local train	2x/hour	Eemshaven - Roodeschool - Groningen (- Winschoten - Bad Nieuweschans)	Arriva	Did not run between Groningen and Bad Nieuweschans and was limited to the Eemshaven until July 13, 2025. Runs 1x/hour in the evenings and on Sundays. Does not run between Groningen and Bad Nieuweschans on Sundays.
37700	Local train	1x/hour	Groningen - Delfzijl	Arriva	Only runs on Sundays from July 13, 2025.
37800	Local train	2x/hour	Groningen - Veendam	Arriva	Ran exclusively between Groningen and Veendam until July 13, 2025.
37900	Express train	2x/hour	Groningen - Winschoten	Arriva	Rush hour train.
38000	Express train	0-2x/hour	Leeuwarden - Sneek	Arriva	Rush hour train.
3800	Express train	1x/hour	Zwolle - Emmen	Arriva	
3900	Intercity	2x/hour	Enkhuizen - Heerlen	NS	Only runs from Monday to Thursday between Enkhuizen and Eindhoven Centraal.
4000	Sprinter	2x/hour	Rotterdam Centraal - Uitgeest	NS	
400	Nightjet	1x/night	Amsterdam Centraal - Zürich HB	ÖBB	
4100	Sprinter	2x/hour	Hoorn Kersenboogerd - Hoofddorp	NS	
420	Nightjet	1x/night	Amsterdam Centraal - Innsbruck Hbf / Wien Hbf	ÖBB	
4300	Sprinter	2x/hour	Den Haag Centraal - Lelystad Centrum	NS	
4400	Sprinter	2x/hour	(Oss -) 's-Hertogenbosch - Deurne	NS	Limited from/to Oss.
450	European Sleeper	3x/week	Brussel-Zuid - Amsterdam Centraal - Berlin Ostbahnhof - Praha hl.n.	European Sleeper	
4600	Sprinter	2x/hour	Amsterdam Centraal - Almere Oostvaarders	NS	
4800	Sprinter	2x/hour	Amsterdam Centraal - Beverwijk - Hoorn	NS	
4900	Sprinter	2x/hour	Almere Centrum - Utrecht Centraal	NS	Does not stop at all stations.
5000	Sprinter	2x/hour	Dordrecht - Den Haag Centraal	NS	
500	Intercity	1x/hour	Groningen - Den Haag Centraal	NS	
5100	Sprinter	2x/hour	Dordrecht - Den Haag Centraal	NS	
5200	Sprinter	2x/hour	Dordrecht - Den Haag Centraal	NS	
5300	Sprinter	2x/hour	Harderwijk - Amersfoort Centraal	NS	Runs from April 7, 2025. Runs Mon-Thu during the morning rush hour to Amersfoort Centraal. Runs Mon-Thu during the afternoon rush hour to Harderwijk.
5400	Sprinter	2x/hour	Amsterdam Centraal - Zandvoort aan Zee	NS	
5500	Sprinter	2x/hour	Utrecht Centraal - Baarn	NS	
5600	Sprinter	2x/hour	Zwolle - Utrecht Centraal	NS	
5700	Sprinter	2x/hour	Utrecht Centraal - Weesp - Leiden Centraal	NS	
5800	Sprinter	2x/hour	Amersfoort Vathorst - Amsterdam Centraal	NS	
5900	Sprinter	2x/hour	Dordrecht - Roosendaal	NS	
6000	Sprinter	0-2x/hour	Den Haag Centraal - 's-Hertogenbosch	NS	
600	Intercity	1x/hour	Leeuwarden - Den Haag Centraal	NS	
6100	Sprinter	2x/hour	Groningen - Zwolle	NS	
6200	Sprinter	2x/hour	Groningen - Assen	NS	Rush hour train.
6300	Sprinter	2x/hour	Den Haag Centraal - Haarlem	NS	
6400	Sprinter	2x/hour	Tilburg Universiteit - Eindhoven Centraal (- Weert)	NS	
6500	Sprinter	1x/hour	Roosendaal - Vlissingen	NS	Only Mon-Fri until 20:00.
6600	Sprinter	2x/hour	Dordrecht - Arnhem Centraal	NS	
6700	Sprinter	0-2x/hour	Leiden Centraal - Tiel	NS	
6800	Sprinter	2x/hour	Den Haag Centraal - Gouda Goverwelle	NS	Rush hour train Mon-Thu.
6900	Sprinter	2x/hour	Den Haag Centraal - Tiel	NS	
7000	Sprinter	2x/hour	(Enschede -) Almelo - Apeldoorn	NS	Only runs between Enschede and Almelo during rush hour.
700	Intercity	1x/hour	Groningen - Schiphol Airport	NS	
7100	Local train	1-2x/hour	Dordrecht - Gorinchem	Qbuzz	Does not stop at Hardinxveld Blauwe Zoom. Runs only 1x per hour after 20:30 in the evenings and on Sundays.
7200	Local train	1-2x/hour	Dordrecht - Geldermalsen	Qbuzz	
7300	Sprinter	2x/hour	Breukelen - Rhenen	NS	
7400	Sprinter	2x/hour	Uitgeest - Driebergen-Zeist	NS	
7500	Sprinter	2x/hour	Ede-Wageningen - Arnhem Centraal	NS	
7600	Sprinter	2x/hour	Zutphen - Wijchen	NS	
7900	Sprinter	2x/hour	Zwolle - Enschede	Keolis Nederland	
8000	Local train	1-2x/hour	Zwolle - Emmen	Arriva	
800	Intercity	1x/hour	Leeuwarden - Schiphol Airport	NS	
8100	Sprinter	2x/hour	Amsterdam Centraal - Hoofddorp	NS	
8200	Sprinter	2x/hour	Amsterdam Centraal - Hoofddorp	NS	
8300	Sprinter	2x/hour	Amsterdam Centraal - Hoofddorp	NS	
8400	Sprinter	2x/hour	Amsterdam Centraal - Hoofddorp	NS	
8500	Sprinter	2x/hour	Zwolle - Kampen	Keolis Nederland	
8600	Sprinter	2x/hour	Alphen aan den Rijn - Gouda	NS	
8700	Sprinter	2x/hour	Alphen aan den Rijn - Gouda	NS	Only Mon-Fri until 19:00.
8800	Sprinter	2x/hour	Leiden Centraal - 's-Hertogenbosch	NS	
8900	Sprinter	0-2x/hour	Leiden Centraal - Utrecht Centraal	NS	
9000	Sprinter	2x/hour	Leeuwarden - Lelystad Centrum	NS	
9100	Eurostar	2-3x/day	Amsterdam Centraal - Brussel-Zuid - London St. Pancras International	Eurostar	Lille Europe is served irregularly.
9200	EuroCity	1x/hour	Rotterdam Centraal - Brussel-Zuid	NS International	
9300	Eurostar	1x/hour	Amsterdam Centraal - Paris Nord	Eurostar	
9500	Eurocity Direct	1x/hour	Lelystad Centrum - Brussel-Zuid	NS International	Surcharge for Schiphol Airport - Rotterdam for domestic travelers.
9900	Eurostar	0-2x/day	Amsterdam Centraal - Marne-la-Vallée-Chessy / Bourg-St-Maurice	Eurostar	

== Train routes with reversal of direction ==
Certain train routes change directions on route. All of these consist of multiple units, or push-pull trains with the station:

- 3000, 3100 Arnhem
- 500, 1700, 2000, 2800, 11700 Utrecht

== See also ==
- Railway stations in the Netherlands
- Betuweroute; freight line connecting Rotterdam with the German Ruhr area.
- Rail transport in the Netherlands
