= NS Railinfratrust =

Dutch government agency, owns Netherlands' rail infrastructure

NS Railinfratrust BV
- Type: Government agency
- Industry: Rail Transport
- Founded: 1995
- Headquarters: Utrecht, Netherlands
- Products: Rail Infrastructure Management, Railway Capacity Allocation, Traffic Control
- Revenue: ▲€ 1.260 billion (2006)
- Operating income: ▲€ 31 million (2006)
- Net income: € 0 (2006)
- Number of employees: 2,651 (2006)
- Website: http://www.rijksoverheid.nl/ministeries/fin

The Railinfratrust Company (RIT) is the owner of the rail infrastructure in the Netherlands. ProRail B.V. is the part of RIT that takes care of maintenance and extension of the national railway network infrastructure, of allocating rail capacity, and of traffic control. NS Railinfratrust is a government agency but is not the same company as Nederlandse Spoorwegen. NS Railinfratrust consists of the following infrastructure management organisations: Railinfrabeheer (Rail Infrastructure Management, RIB); Railned (railway capacity allocation) (planning more than 52 hours before the day of the train service); Railverkeersleiding (Traffic Control) (planning from 52 hours before the day of the train service)

== History ==
NS Railinfratrust Ltd was founded as a result of the separation of track and trains in 1995. It is the holding company of the three organisations NS Railinfrabeheer (RIB), Railned and NS Verkeersleiding (NSVL). These three NS-organisations work for the Ministry of Traffic and Water. They were part of the Nederlandse Spoorwegen organisation but were separated on 1 July 2002. Since 1 January 2003 NS Railinfratrust has used the trading name of ProRail.

On 1 January 2003 the three railinfratrust companies (NS Railinfrabeheer Ltd, Railverkeersleiding Ltd and Railned Ltd) merged to form ProRail Ltd. The railway security function of Railned was transferred to the Inspection Service of the Ministry of Traffic and Water. ProRail Ltd is now responsible for capacity management, traffic control, Infrastructure management, Infrastructure projects, track development and ICT services.

== See also ==
- Transportation in the Netherlands
- ProRail
- Nederlandse Spoorwegen
