= ProRail =

Dutch railway infrastructure manager

- Type: Government agency
- Industry: Rail Transport
- Founded: 1 January 2003
- Headquarters: Utrecht, Netherlands
- Products: Rail Infrastructure Management, Railway Capacity Allocation, Traffic Control
- Revenue: ▲€ 1.286 billion (2017)
- Operating income: ▼€ 39 million (2017)
- Net income: € 0 (2017)
- Number of employees: 4,399 (2017)
- Parent: Ministry of Finance (ownership); Ministry of Infrastructure and Water Management (management)
- Website: www.prorail.nl

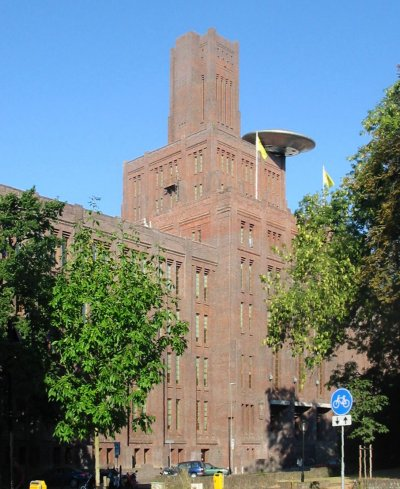
The headquarters of ProRail, de Inktpot, with the UFO

ProRail (Dutch pronunciation: [ˈproːreːl]) is a Dutch government organisation responsible for the maintenance and extension of the national railway network infrastructure (not the metro or tram), the allocation of rail capacity, and controlling rail traffic. Prorail is a part of NS Railinfratrust, the Dutch railway infrastructure owner.

Its Utrecht headquarters is in the former offices of Nederlandse Spoorwegen (known as De Inktpot, "The Inkwell"), the largest brick building in the Netherlands. The building currently features a "UFO" on its facade resulting from an art program in 2000.

== History ==
The creation of ProRail can be traced back to policies of the Dutch government implemented during the 1990s; it was decided that rail operations should be reorganised, and that the private sector should have a greater involvement in their operations, in order to improve operations. In 1998, the first outsourced small-scale maintenance operations took place. Despite this direction, government ownership of the national railway infrastructure operator has been retained. Instead, ProRail was established on 1 January 2003 when three separate organisations responsible for rail infrastructure in the Netherlands were merged. Upon its creation, ProRail became responsible for the total cost of ownership and the long-term availability of the rail infrastructure, as well as to avoid operational safety being compromised.

One early reform of the organisation, implemented for the 2007–2011 timeframe, was for all contracts to be publicly tender based on performance and process specifications. This was intended to facilitate effective competition to be awarded contract work while retaining the public service orientation sought by the government. Key functions, such as track inspection, had transitioned to the private sector by 2006. Jan Swier, ProRails Strategic Advisor for Maintenance and Renewals, noted that there were initial concerns over this safety-critical work being performed externally, yet the work has been effectively performed, aiding by the introduction of sophisticated track inspection machinery. All track is inspected twice per month while busy main lines can be inspected as often as once per week. Trackwork, such as grinding, was largely outsourced; working practices also changed, moving from corrective grinding to preventive grinding to both ease and lower the cost of the work. The implementation of real time asset monitoring was also pursued, by 2006, approximately 1,000 switches in The Netherlands had been equipped with remote condition monitoring equipment.

In the late 2000s, in response to repeated year-on-year rises in both passenger and freight traffic on the network, ProRail developed a new 'Triple A' strategy to deliver a 50 percent increase in capacity, to be achieved via the adoption of smarter planning, the reorganisation of train services, and new construction works. In late 2008, the Ministry of Transport allocated €4.5 billion for a multi-year investment to introduce the Triple A strategy along several key railway corridors. During the early 2010s, ProRail trialed high-frequency twin-track operations as a means of expanding capacity.

Throughout the 2010s, ProRail has increasing the use of digital working practices and technologies throughout its operations; amongst other changes, various paper forms have been replaced with digital counterparts delivered via mobile devices. Trials of technology for various purposes, such as digital visual indicators of train occupancy, have been carried out. Continuous weather monitoring now routinely informs operations so that services can be reshaped where appropriate to minimise the impact of bad weather even prior to its arrival. The organisation has also made use of digital twins of key pieces of infrastructure to improve maintenance operations. In 2021, the ProRail Monitoring Platform (PMP) was revealed, which monitors the majority of infrastructure assets overseen by the organisation and it intended to enable the transition from condition-based monitoring to performing predictive maintenance, facilitating more efficient use of resources.

In 2014, the organisation released a report on various scenarios for rolling out the next generation European Rail Traffic Management System (ERTMS) across the Netherlands. The Dutch government directed that digital railway signaling be rolled out nationwide; ProRail and NS have partnered to implement ERTMS and will initially focus upon retrofitting rolling stock for level 2 operations. During March 2022, ProRail announced that the French company Thales Group had been selected to provide signaling apparatus, referred to as the Central Safety System (CSS), in support of the ERTMS rollout. In September of that year, the multinational engineering firm Arcadis were contracted to provide engineering services for the rollout.

During June 2022, ProRail appealed to the Dutch government to subsidise train operators of both passenger and freight services, noting that its charges has to comply with the European rules for consumer compensation, yet the sector would suffer due to double digit price rises. In January 2023, figures released for 2022 showed that rail users had been subject to some of the worst performance statistics recorded in recent years in terms of delays and cancellations, which was in part attributable to strikes. That same month, RailGood, an employers’ organisation representing the rail freight industry, publicly claimed that ProRail was letting down rail freight operators; specific complaints included increased infrastructure charges for 2023, which RailGood referred to "excessive", as well as allegations of mismanagement of the railway infrastructure.

== Operations ==
=== Railinfrabeheer ===
Railinfrabeheer (Rail Infrastructure Management, RIB) takes care of the infrastructure. This does not include most sidings on private property, these were sold off to Strukton Rail Short Line BV in 2015. Maintenance is carried out by several contractors, including VolkerRail, Strukton and ASSET Rail. Part of this division is the Incidentenbestrijding (Incident Response Unit) which manages various incidents on the network, like breakdowns, collisions or derailments.

=== Timetable management ===
The capacity the whole railway network is controlled by ProRail. Every year on the second Sunday of December the new timetable for the following year goes into effect. Planning this new timetable is done years in advance. In the planning stage all users can state the train services they wish to operate in this year.

Companies using the ProRail network are:

- Nederlandse Spoorwegen (NS), using most of the network for long-distance intercity-services and local trains along the same lines. This network is commonly known as hoofdrailnet (main rail network).
- NMBS/SNCB, Thalys, Eurostar and DB, which operate various international services to neighbouring countries (including local trains to those countries).
- Connexxion (including Breng), Qbuzz, Arriva and Keolis on the other contracted lines. Arriva is the biggest in this respect, with train running in the north, east and south of the country.
- Cargo operators including DB Cargo, Rotterdam Rail Feeding, CapTrain, Rail Force One and Lineas. Most other cargo operators plan their trains shortly before departure, and thus are managed by Traffic Control.
- RailExperts, Train Charter Services and many cargo operators use the network for charters, ad-hoc trains or empty movements. These are mostly planned at short notice, using empty pathing provided in the timetable.

=== Railverkeersleiding ===
Railverkeersleiding (Traffic Control) is responsible for managing current operations on the network. Traffic Control is the section which operates signals and communicates with drivers. Short-term planning, less than 52 hours before the day of the train service, is also part of this division. All companies use this facility to compensate for unplanned events.

== Funding ==
Funding for ProRail is primarily provided via a government subsidy, on top of which fees are charged to the various railway operators (called infraheffing). The government subsidy totalled around €2.5 billion from 2014–2017, and the infraheffing totalled approximately €200 million in 2006, the remaining income was listed as 'other'. The fee that the public transport operators initially had to pay for this is lower than the cost, but has been progressively increased over time. In 2003, it was €0.64 per train km and €0.54 to €2.16 for stopping at a station.

== Performance oriented maintenance ==
Railways in the Netherlands are not maintained by ProRail itself. Instead, it is subcontracted to recognised maintenance contractors. This model has been contrasted with that of the privately owned British rail infrastructure owner Railtrack (replaced by Network Rail in October 2002), although ProRail has stated that it has intentionally made efforts to learn from the shortcomings of Railtrack, which had collapsed prior to ProRail's creation. The Dutch railway network is subdivided into 21 areas. For each area, all of the regular maintenance is contracted as one package, which is won by the contractor that submits the best offer. The contractor receives a fixed sum per month, and is fined in case of failure to meet the required performance. Contractors are incentivised to minimise cost, while ensuring good performance of the assets. This is called prestatiegericht onderhoud (performance oriented maintenance).

As of 2019, the recognised maintenance contractors are:

- ASSET Rail (a joint venture by Arcadis and Dura Vermeer)
- BAM Infra Rail
- Strukton Rail
- VolkerRail

== See also ==
- Transportation in the Netherlands
