= Kleve station =

Railway station in Kleve, Germany

Kleve
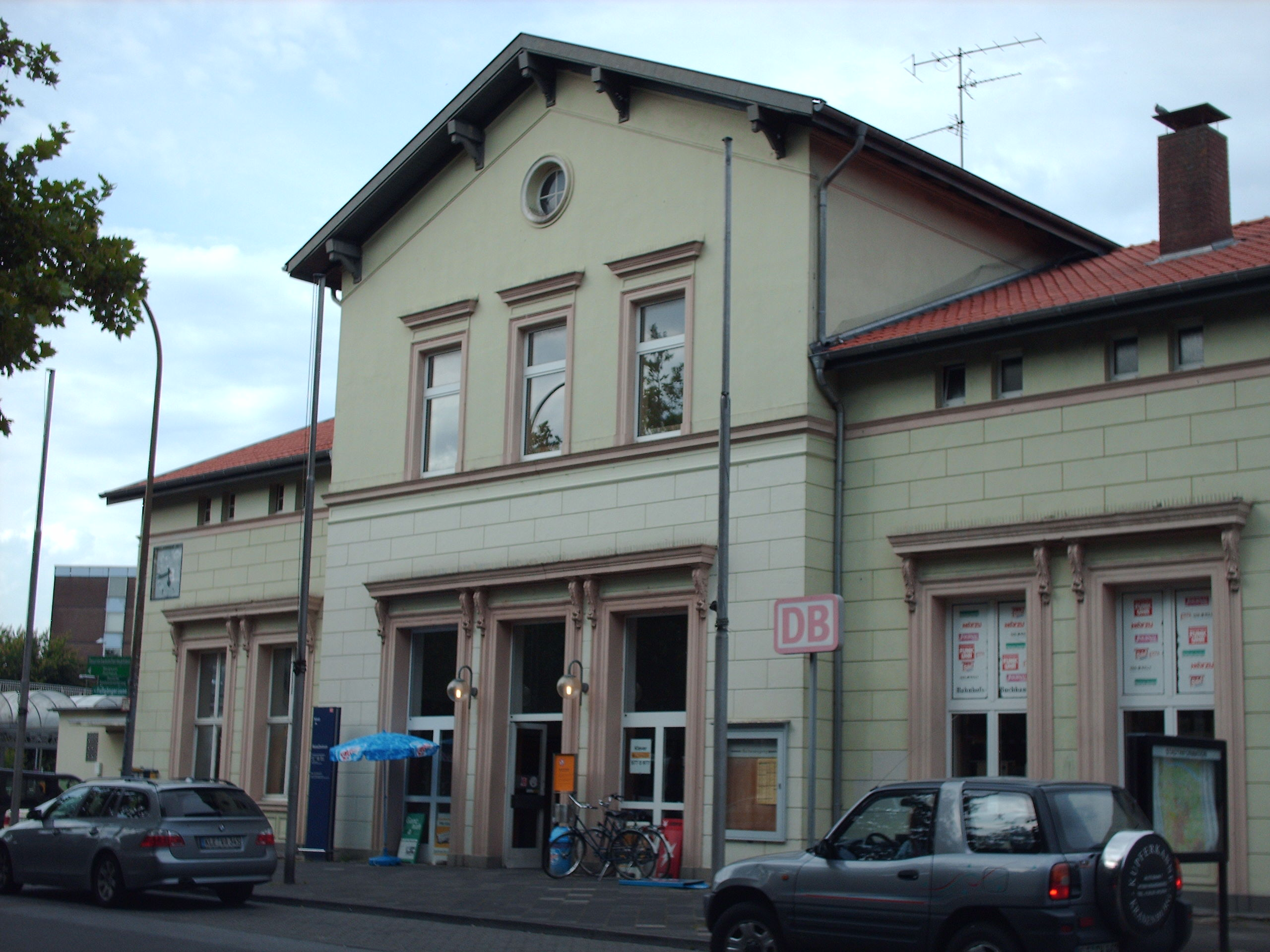
- Kleve station

General information
- Location: Bahnhofsplatz 17, Kleve, NRW; Germany
- Coordinates: 51°47′21″N 6°08′50″E
- Line: Lower Left Rhine Railway
- Platforms: 2
- Tracks: 2

Construction
- Accessible: Yes

Other information
- Station code: 3265
- DS100 code: KKLV
- IBNR: 8000205
- Category: 6
- Fare zone: VRR: 801
- Website: www.bahnhof.de

History
- Opened: 5 March 1863

Services
Preceding station	NordWestBahn	Following station
Terminus	RE 10	Bedburg-Hau towards Düsseldorf Hbf
Location

Kleve is a railway station in the town of Kleve, North Rhine Westphalia, Germany. The station opened on 5 March 1863 on the Lower Left Rhine Railway. The train services are operated by NordWestBahn.

== History ==
The station was an important international station on the Nijmegen - Kleve - Kevelaer - Krefeld - Düsseldorf route until 1991. In Kleve the line is no longer intact towards Nijmegen, however there are sections which still exist outside the town. The station also had a connection to Rheinhausen until 1990. Until 1982 there was also a line to Zevenaar.

== Train services ==
The station is served by the following services:

- Regional service RE 10 Kleve - Kevelaer - Krefeld - Düsseldorf

== Bus services ==
A number of buses serve the station, including to Nijmegen, Emmerich, Xanten and Kranenburg.
