= Gare =

Gare is the word for "station" in French and related languages, commonly meaning railway station

Gare can refer to:

== People ==
- Gare (surname), surname
- The Gare Family, fictional characters in the novel Wild Geese by Martha Ostenso

== Places ==
- Gare, Zavidovići, Bosnia and Herzegovina
- Gare (Gadžin Han), a village situated in Gadžin Han municipality in Serbia
- Garé, Hungary
- Gare, Luxembourg, neighborhood around the railway station in Luxembourg City, Luxembourg
- Gare Loch, an open see loch in Argyll and Bute, Scotland
- Pompoï-gare, Pompoï-gare is a village in the Pompoï Department of Balé Province in southern Burkina Faso
- South Gare, an area of reclaimed land and breakwater on the southern side of the mouth of the River Tees in Redcar and Cleveland, England
  - South Gare & Coatham Sands SSSI, Site of Special Scientific Interest
  - South Gare Lighthouse, at the end of the South Gare breakwater

== Transportation ==
Gare refers to many stations in Francophone and other countries, including:

=== Africa ===
- Gare d'Alger, main railway station in Algers, Algeria
- Gare Casa-Voyageurs, main railway station in Casablanca, Morocco
- Gare de Casa-Port, railway terminal in the port of Casablanca
- Gare de Tunis, also Tunis Gare Centrale, the main railway station in Tunis, Tunisia
- Gare Mahdia, railway station in Mahdia, Tunisia

=== Americas ===
- Gare centrale de Montréal, main railway station in Montréal, Quebec, Canada
- Gare du Palais, main railway station in Quebec City, Quebec, Canada
- Gare d'autocars de Montréal, major bus station in Montréal, Quebec, Canada

=== Europe ===
==== Belgium ====
- Gare de Bruxelles-Central, central station of Brussels
- Gare de Bruxelles-Midi, largest railway station in Belgium
- Gare de Bruxelles-Nord, commonly known as Gare du Nord, 3rd largest in Belgium

==== France ====
- Gare du Nord, Paris, officially Gare de Paris-Nord, the largest railway station in Europe
- Gare du Nord (Paris Metro), the busiest subway station on the Paris Metro

==== Luxembourg ====
- Gare de Luxembourg, main railway station in Luxembourg

==== Portugal ====
- Gare do Oriente, main international intermodal transport hub, Lisbon

== Other uses ==
- Gare-fowl, alternative English name for the Great Auk

== See also ==
- Gare Centrale (disambiguation)
- Gare du Nord (disambiguation)
- Gares (Puente la Reina)
- Garesh
