= Waterloo railway station, Belgium =

Railway station in Walloon Brabant, Belgium

Waterloo
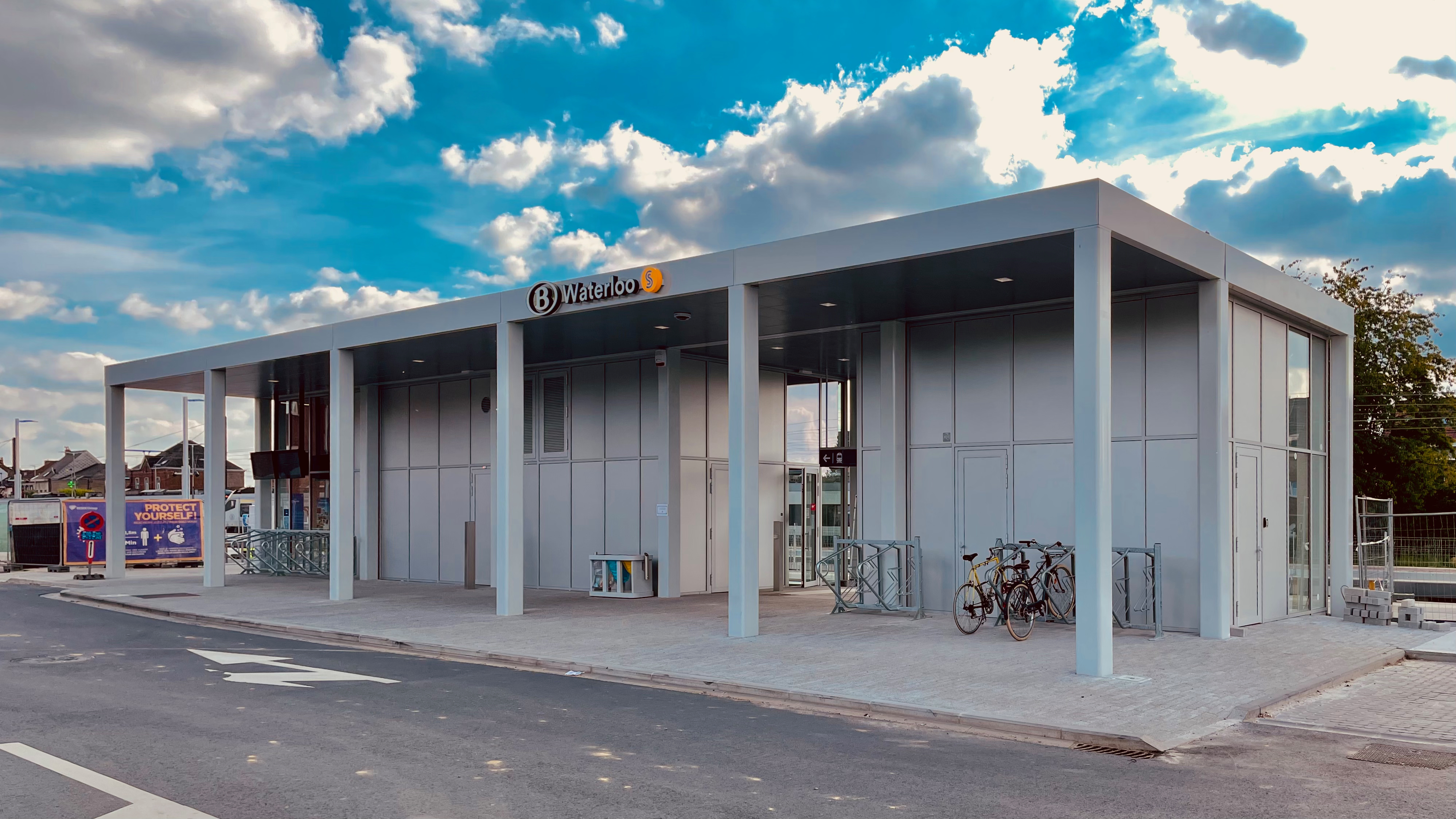
- Waterloo railway station

General information
- Location: Waterloo, Walloon Brabant; Belgium
- Coordinates: 50°42′53″N 4°23′00″E
- System: Railway Station
- Owner: SNCB/NMBS
- Operator: SNCB/NMBS
- Line: 124
- Platforms: 2
- Tracks: 2

Other information
- Station code: FWT
- Website: Official website

History
- Opened: 1 February 1874; 152 years ago

Passengers
- 2014: 1,965 per day
Location
- Location within Belgium Location within Europe

Waterloo railway station (French: Gare de Waterloo; Dutch: Station Waterloo) (Note: Officially Waterloo) is a railway station in Waterloo, Walloon Brabant, Belgium. The station opened on 1 February 1874 and is located on railway line 124. The train services are operated by the National Railway Company of Belgium (SNCB/NMBS).

The station is large, with platforms able to accommodate trains much longer than any currently scheduled to operate to (or through) the station. It is fully staffed, with the booking office open seven days a week.

The railway line between Nivelles–Waterloo–Linkebeek (south of Brussels) is currently being enlarged to allow a higher frequency of local and intercity trains.

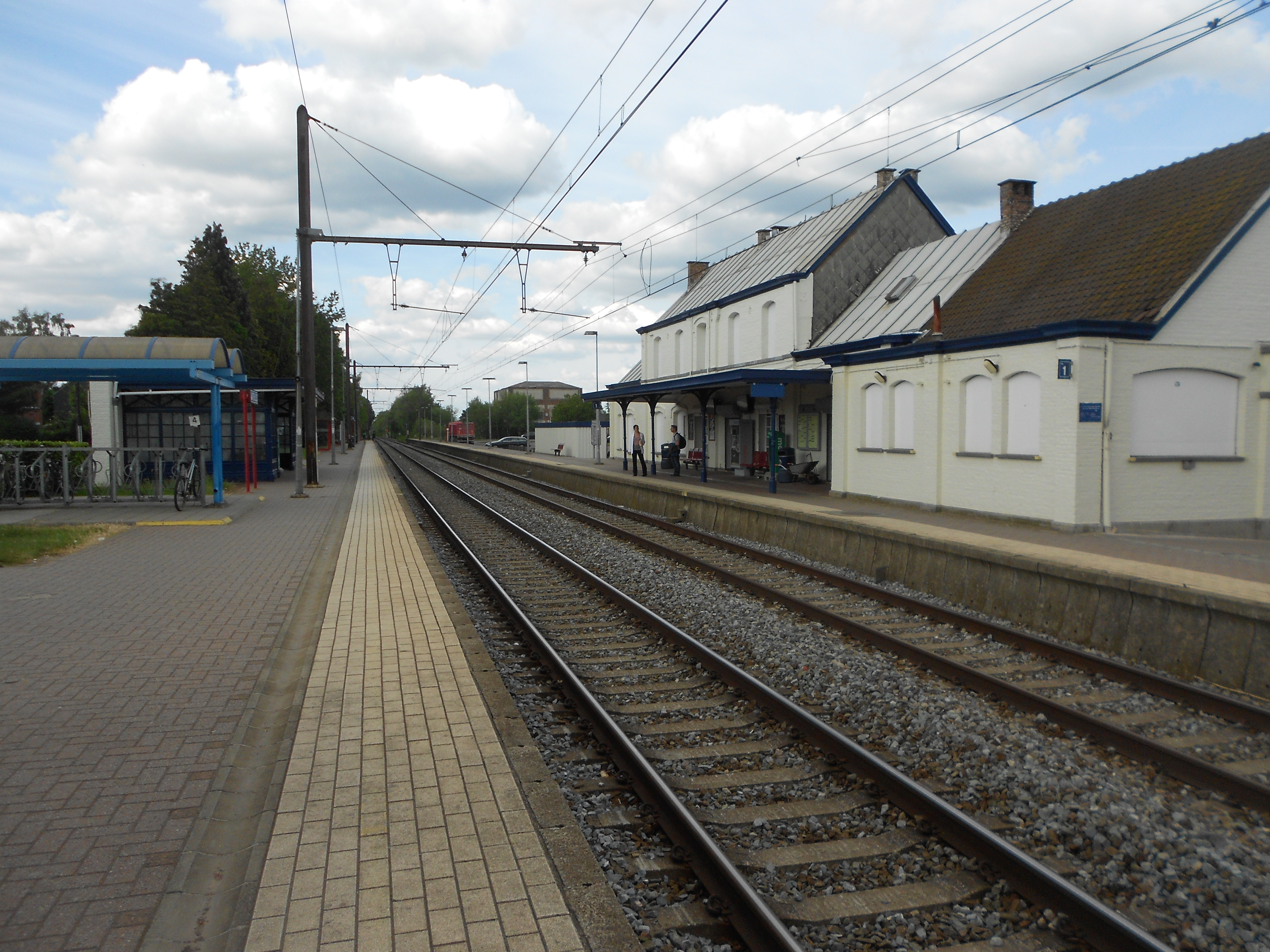
The old Waterloo train station, demolished in 2021

== Train services ==
There is at least one train every hour in each direction at Waterloo. The station is served by the following services:

- Intercity services (IC-27) Brussels Airport - Brussels-Luxembourg - Nivelles - Charleroi (weekdays)
- Brussels RER services (S1) Antwerp - Mechelen - Brussels - Waterloo - Nivelles (weekdays)
- Brussels RER services (S1) Brussels - Waterloo - Nivelles (weekends)
- Brussels RER services (S9) Leuven - Brussels-Luxembourg - Etterbeek - Braine-l'Alleud (weekdays)

Preceding station	NMBS/SNCB	Following station
Sint-Genesius-Rode towards Brussels National Airport	IC 27 weekdays	Braine-l'Alleud towards Charleroi-Sud
De Hoek towards Antwerpen-Centraal	S 1 weekdays	Braine-l'Alleud towards Nivelles
De Hoek towards Bruxelles-Nord / Brussel-Noord	S 1 weekends	Braine-l'Alleud towards Nivelles
Sint-Genesius-Rode towards Leuven	S 9 weekdays	Braine-l'Alleud Terminus

== Gallery ==
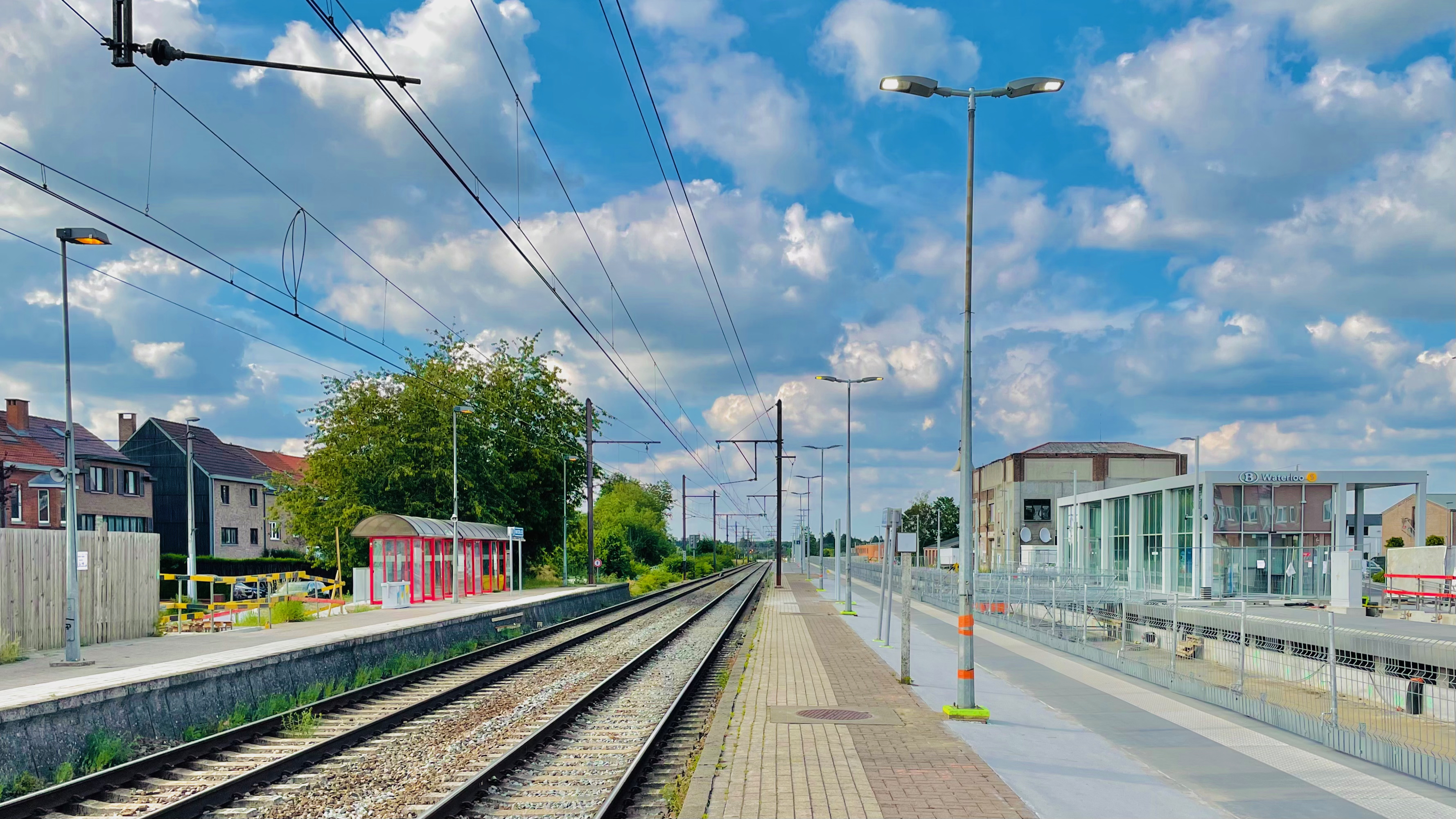
View of the platforms and tracks

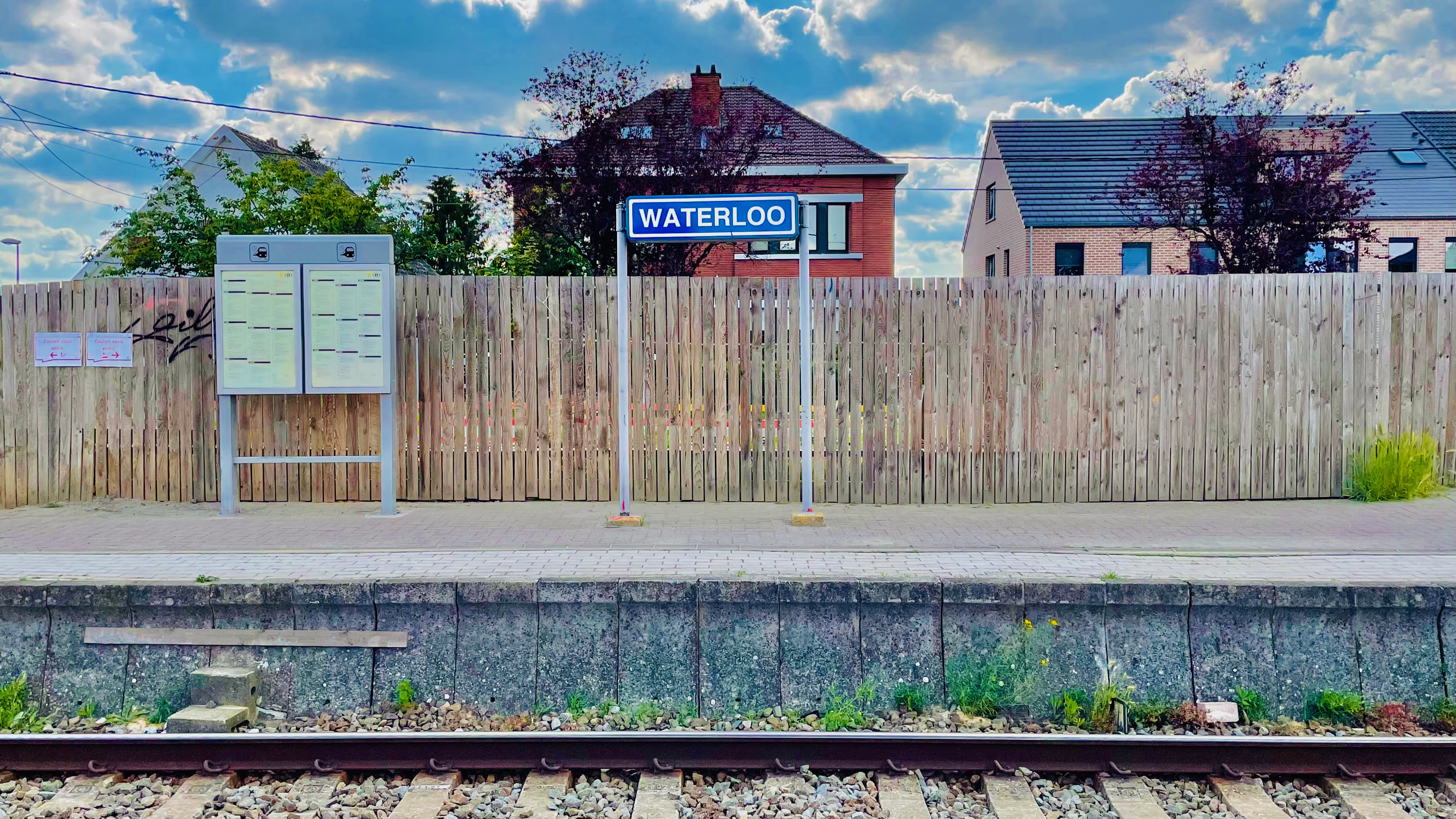
Place name sign on a platform

== See also ==
- List of railway stations in Belgium
- Rail transport in Belgium
