= Stalle, Brussels =

Stalle
- Neighbourhood
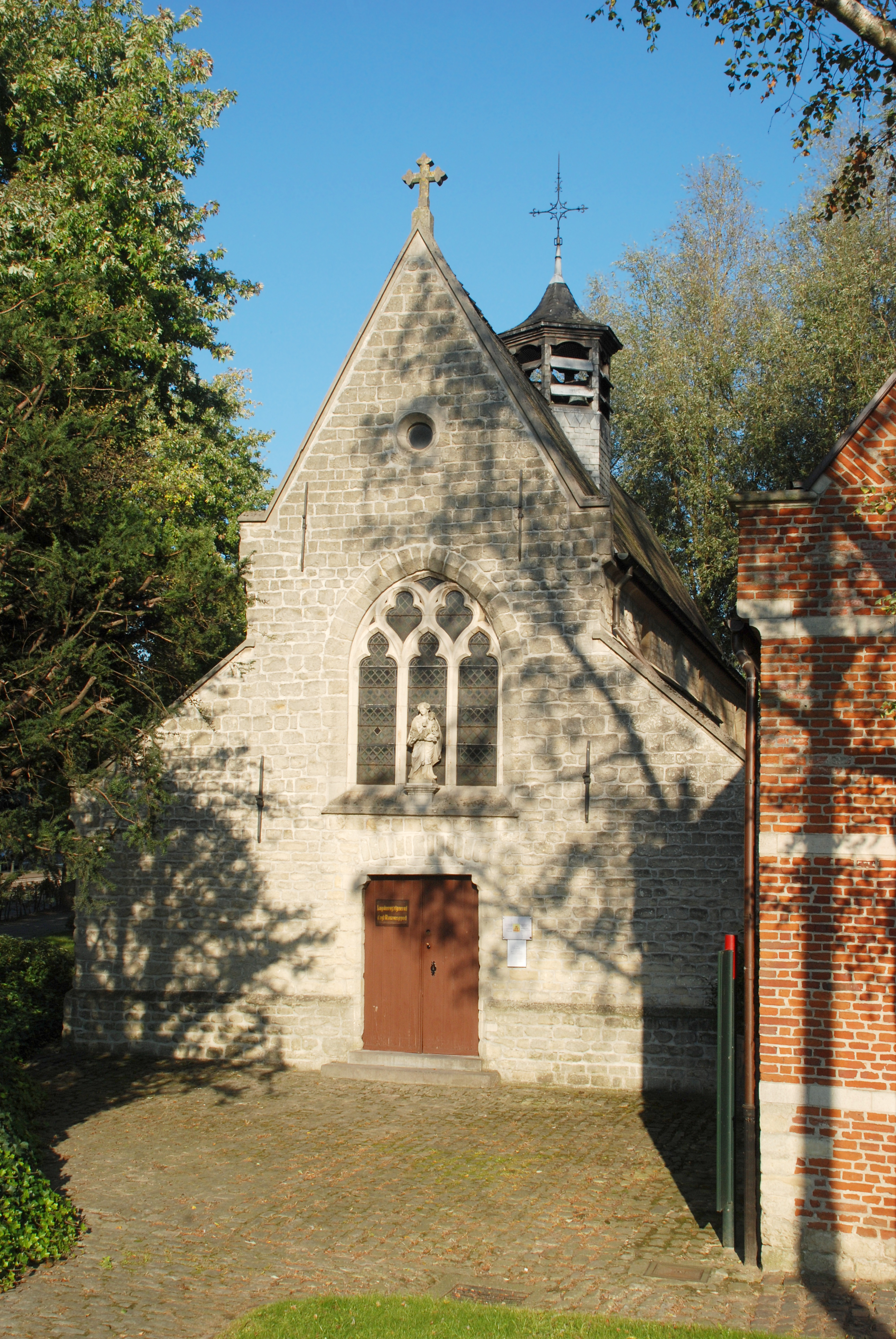
- Stalle Chapel

- Location within Brussels Stalle (Belgium)
- Coordinates: 50°47′56″N 4°19′59″E
- Country: Belgium
- Region: Brussels-Capital Region
- Arrondissement: Brussels-Capital
- Municipality: Uccle
- Time zone: UTC+1 (CET)
  - Summer (DST): UTC+2 (CEST)
- Postal code: 1060, 1070, 1080
- Area codes: 02

Stalle is a district of Brussels, Belgium, located within the municipality of Uccle. The area lies between the valleys of the Geleytsbeek and the Ukkelbeek and takes its name from the former lordship of Stalle. Its inhabitants were traditionally nicknamed the Zoêvelbooren (“sand farmers”), a reference to the district's agricultural past. Archaeological evidence shows that the territory has been inhabited since ancient times.

== History ==
Stalle was first recorded as a lordship in the 12th century, held by the House of Stalle, one of at least seventeen families associated with it. The first known lords were Henri de Stalle, followed by Florent of Stalle (alderman of Brussels in 1319) and another Florent of Stalle (alderman in 1357), who with his brother Daniel founded the Stalle Chapel and donated lands in 1369. Dependent fiefs included Overhem, located between Dieweg and Stalle, and Roetaert in Neerstalle; Overhem, with its manor, mill, woods, and pasture, was annexed to Stalle in 1465, while Roetaert encompassed 39.78 acres of land and meadows with the manor of Roetaert. The lordship developed further in the 14th–15th centuries, flourishing under Walter van Kersbeke, who established an aldermanic council, and later under Willem van Hamme, mayor of Brussels and baron in 1686, who resided at Stalle Castle. By 1640, the village had about 240 inhabitants along Rue de Stalle/Stallestraat and what is now Chaussée de Neerstalle/Neerstalse Steenweg, retaining a rural character into the 18th century. The last lord, Viscount Jerome Balthazar de Roest d’Alkemade, ceremonially entered Stalle in 1779.

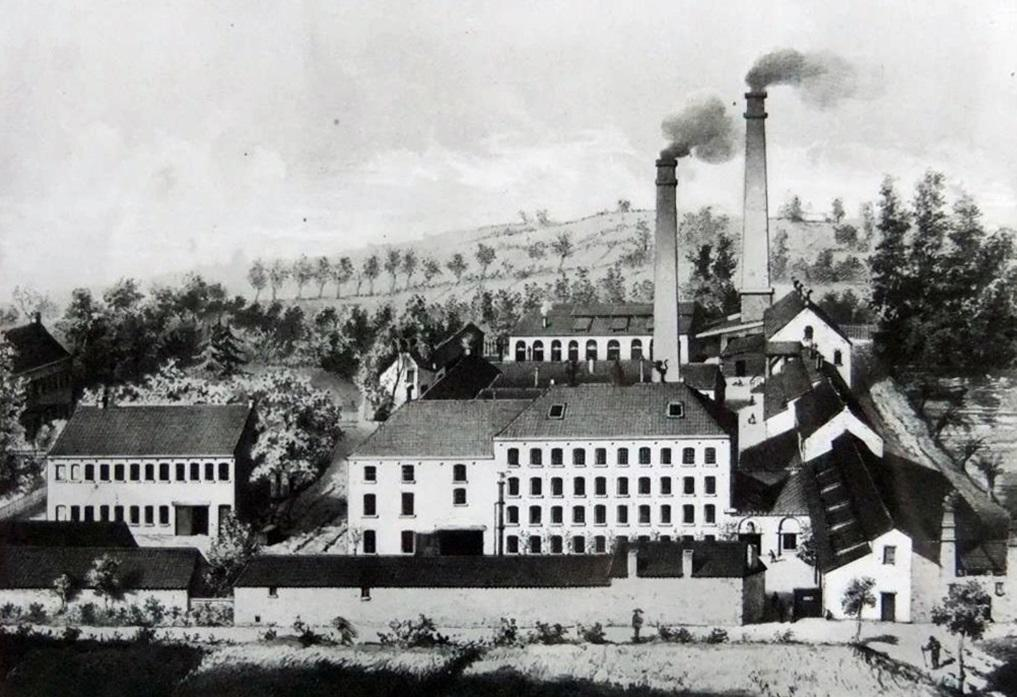
The Wilson factory for weaving, bleaching and printing of cotton materials.

In 1795, under French rule, Stalle merged with the old ducal village of Uccle, forming the modern municipality. Around the same period, a cotton-printing factory was established in Stalle, later expanded by Thomas Wilson in the 1820s with steam power and copper-roller printing, becoming a major industrial site until its decline after World War I. The opening of the Brussels–Luttre–Charleroi railway line in 1873, including Uccle-Stalle railway station, spurred urbanisation, with eclectic houses built near the station by the late 19th century. After World War I, the cotton factory continued to operate under the Société anonyme de Stalle until its closure in 1934.

In 1992, the neighbourhood was commemorated in astronomy when the asteroid 12340 Stalle, discovered on 18 December by E. W. Elst at Caussols, was named after it. From 2016 to 2018, a major stormwater retention basin was constructed along the Ukkelbeek, a 1.4 km tunnel with a 4.5 m diameter and five overflow points, designed to hold 20,000–25,000 m^{3} of water during heavy storms and release it gradually into the sewer network.

== Sights ==
- The Stalle Chapel or Chapel of Our Lady of Good Assistance, is a Gothic chapel founded by the lords of Stalle in the 14th century and restored in 1932, features rare architectural elements and now serves a Byzantine rite community.
- Stalle Castle or Château de Papenkasteel, built in 1685, is a castle within a Natura 2000 area and a rare survivor of the “pleasant countryside” estates, water-surrounded retreats for Brussels’ patrician families.
- The St Paul's Church, Uccle, built in the 1940s and opened in 1952, has been used by the Romanian Orthodox community in Brussels since 2015.
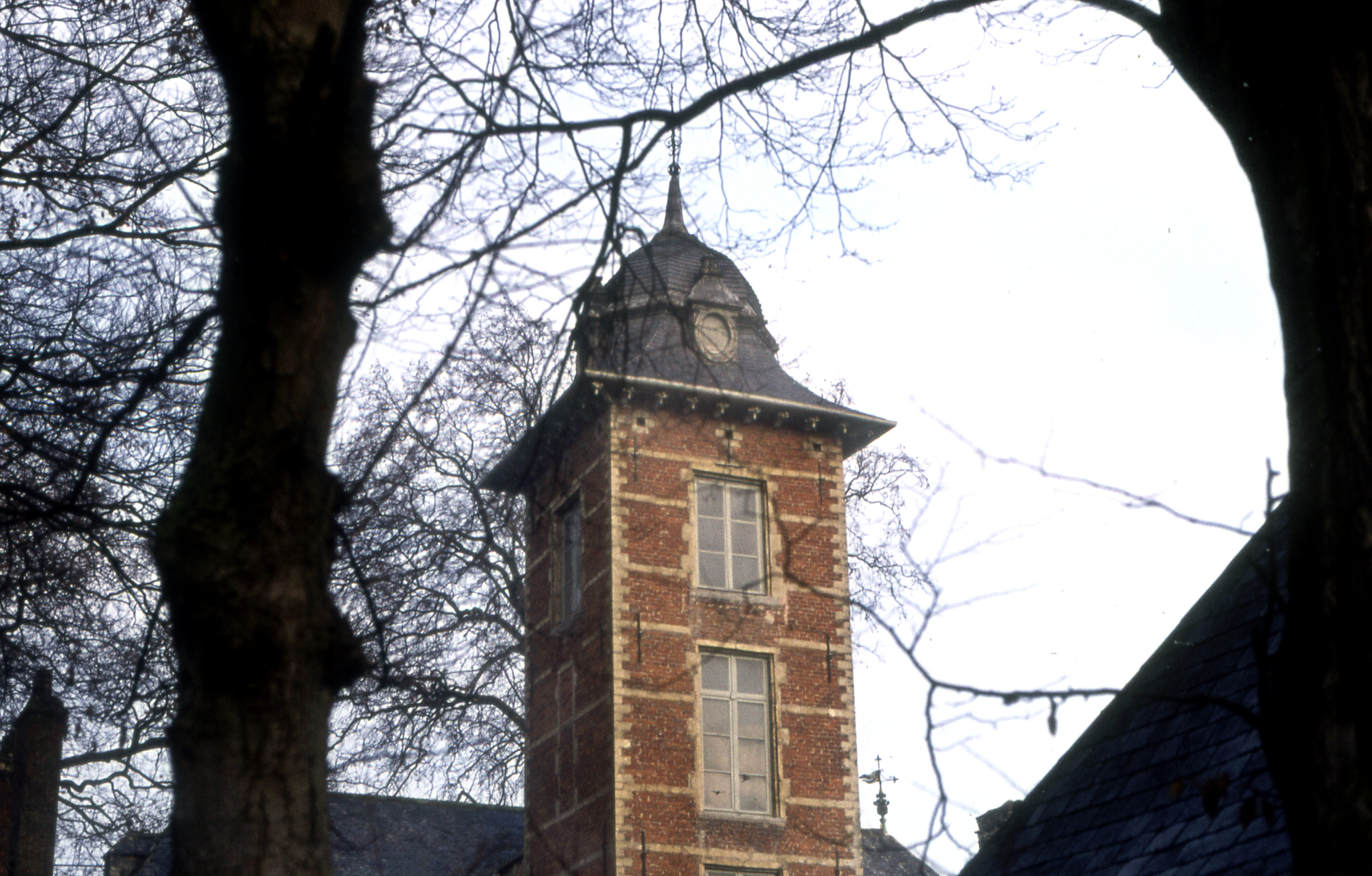
Stalle Castle

== See also ==
- Neighbourhoods in Brussels
- History of Brussels
- Culture of Belgium
- Belgium in the long nineteenth century
