= Brussels-South railway station =

Railway and metro station in Brussels, Belgium

Brussels-South
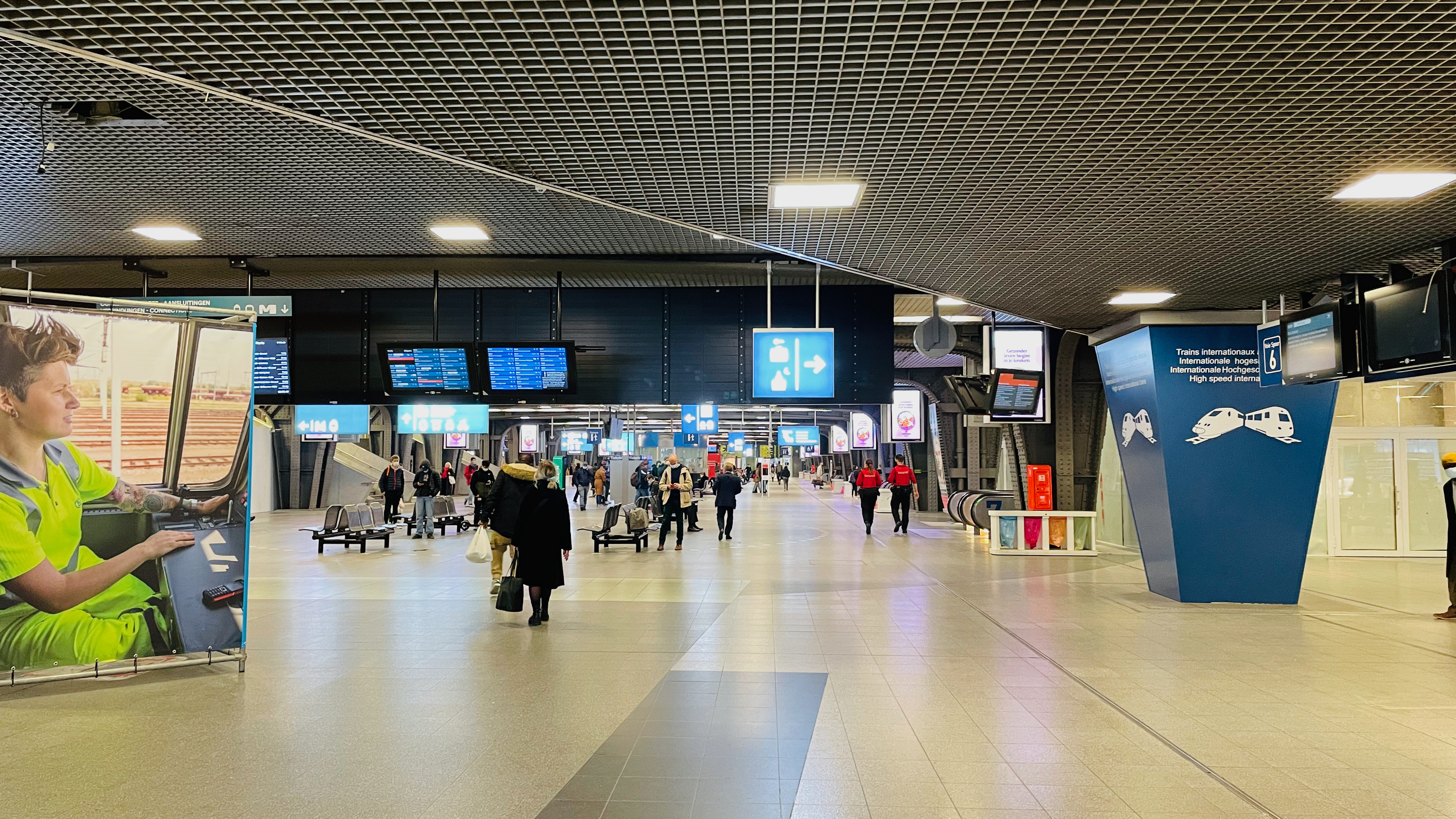
- Main hall of Brussels-South railway station

General information
- Location: Avenue Fonsny / Fonsnylaan 47B; 1060 Saint-Gilles, Brussels-Capital Region; Belgium
- Coordinates: 50°50′6.58″N 4°20′6.8″E
- Elevation: 26 m (85 ft)
- System: Railway Station
- Owner: SNCB/NMBS
- Operator: SNCB/NMBS
- Lines: 0, 50A, 96, 124
- Platforms: 12
- Tracks: 22
- Connections: Brussels Metro: 2 4 6 10 (at metro station)

Construction
- Architect: Adrien Blomme, Yvan Blomme and Fernand Petit
- Architectural style: Modernism

Other information
- Station code: FBMZ
- IATA code: ZYR
- Website: Official website

History
- Opened: 4 October 1952; 73 years ago
International services
Preceding station	Eurostar	Following station
Lille-Europe towards London	Eurostar	Rotterdam Centraal towards Amsterdam Centraal
Paris-Nord Terminus	Eurostar	Antwerpen-Centraal towards Amsterdam Centraal
Paris-Nord Terminus	Eurostar	Liège-Guillemins towards Dortmund Hbf
Aéroport Charles de Gaulle towards Disneyland Paris, Marseille or Bourg-Saint-Maurice	Eurostar	Antwerpen-Centraal towards Amsterdam Centraal
Chambéry towards Bourg-Saint-Maurice	Eurostar (winter)	Antwerpen-Centraal towards Amsterdam Centraal
Valence TGV towards Marseille-Saint-Charles	Eurostar (summer)	Antwerpen-Centraal towards Amsterdam Centraal
Preceding station	DB Fernverkehr	Following station
Terminus	ICE 79	Brussels-North towards Frankfurt (Main) Hbf
Preceding station	SNCF	Following station
Terminus	TGV inOui	Lille-Europe towards Marseille
Terminus	TGV inOui	Lille-Europe towards Perpignan
Terminus	TGV inOui	Lille-Europe towards Strasbourg
Preceding station	NMBS/SNCB	Following station
Terminus	IC J IC "des Ardennes" & Luxembourg	Brussels-Central towards Luxembourg
Preceding station	NS International	Following station
Brussels-Central towards Rotterdam Centraal	Eurocity 9200	Terminus
Antwerpen-Centraal towards Lelystad Centrum	Eurocity Direct 9500	Terminus
Preceding station	European Sleeper	Following station
Terminus	Brussels–Milan	Verviers-Central towards Milano Porta Garibaldi
Terminus	Brussels–Prague	Antwerpen-Centraal towards Prague
Domestic services
Preceding station	NMBS/SNCB	Following station
Gent-Sint-Pieters towards Oostende	IC 01	Brussels-Central towards Eupen
Gent-Sint-Pieters towards Blankenberge or Knokke	IC 03	Brussels-Central towards Genk
Brussels-Central towards Antwerpen-Centraal	IC 05 weekdays	Braine-l'Alleud towards Charleroi-Sud
Halle towards Tournai	IC 06	Brussels-Central towards Brussels National Airport
Braine-le-Comte towards Mons	IC 06A	Brussels-Central towards Brussels National Airport
Halle towards Binche	IC 11 weekdays	Brussels-Central towards Turnhout
Gent-Sint-Pieters towards Kortrijk	IC 12 weekdays	Brussels-Central towards Welkenraedt
Halle towards Quiévrain	IC 14 weekdays	Brussels-Central towards Liège-Guillemins
Terminus	IC 17 weekends	Brussels-Central towards Dinant
Terminus	IC 18 weekdays	Brussels-Central towards Liège-Saint-Lambert
Liedekerke towards Gent-Sint-Pieters	IC 20 weekdays, except holidays	Brussels-Central towards Tongeren
Liedekerke towards Gent-Sint-Pieters	IC 20 weekends	Brussels-Central towards Lokeren
Brussels-Central towards Essen	IC 22 weekdays, except holidays	Terminus
Brussels-Central towards Antwerpen-Centraal	IC 22 weekends	Halle towards Binche
Denderleeuw towards Oostende	IC 23	Brussels-Central towards Brussels National Airport
Gent-Sint-Pieters towards Brugge	IC 23A	Brussels-Central towards Brussels National Airport
Halle towards Kortrijk	IC 26 weekdays	Brussels-Central towards Sint-Niklaas
Liedekerke towards De Panne	IC 29	Brussels-Central towards Landen
Brussels-Central towards Antwerpen-Centraal	IC 31 weekdays, except holidays	Terminus
Brussels-Central towards Antwerpen-Centraal	IC 31 weekends	Braine-l'Alleud towards Charleroi-Sud
Brussels-Chapel towards Antwerpen-Centraal	S 1 weekdays	Forest-East towards Nivelles
Brussels-Central towards Bruxelles-Nord / Brussel-Noord	S 1 weekends	Forest-East towards Nivelles
Brussels-Central towards Antwerpen-Centraal	S 1 weekends	Terminus
Brussels-Chapel towards Antwerpen-Centraal	S 1	Forest-East towards Nivelles
Brussels-Central towards Leuven	S 2	Forest-South towards Braine-le-Comte
Brussels-Central towards Dendermonde	S 3	Denderleeuw towards Oudenaarde
Brussels-Central towards Schaarbeek	S 6	Halle towards Aalst
Brussels-Central towards Louvain-la-Neuve	S 8	Terminus
Brussels-Central towards Aalst	S 10	Brussels-West towards Dendermonde
Location

Brussels-South railway station, also known as Brussels-Midi railway station (French: Gare de Bruxelles-Midi; Dutch: Station Brussel-Zuid) (Note: Officially Brussels-South (French: Bruxelles-Midi; Dutch: Brussel-Zuid)), is a major railway station in Brussels, Belgium. Geographically, it is located in Saint-Gilles/Sint-Gillis on the border with the adjacent municipality of Anderlecht and just south of the City of Brussels.

Brussels-South is one of over a dozen railway stations in Brussels, and one of the three principal rail stations in the heart of the city, the two others being Brussels-Central and Brussels-North. The station, which was a terminus when it was inaugurated in 1869, became a transit station with the opening of the North–South connection in 1952. Nowadays, it is the busiest station in Belgium, and is the only Brussels stop for international high-speed rail services Eurostar (including the former Thalys) and TGV. It is operated by the National Railway Company of Belgium (SNCB/NMBS).

Underneath Brussels-South is the rapid transit station Gare du Midi/Zuidstation on lines 2, 4, 6 and 10 of the Brussels Metro and premetro (underground tram) systems, which serves as an important node of the Brussels Intercommunal Transport Company (STIB/MIVB).

== Naming ==
The station was named after Le Midi, the French name of the region of Southern France, as trains departing from this station in the 19th century had that region as their final destination. The term Midi derives from mi ('middle') and di ('day') in Old French, comparable to the term Mezzogiorno to indicate Southern Italy or Miazăzi which is a synonym for South in Romanian. The name Brussel-Zuid, as the Dutch "translation" of Bruxelles-Midi, was only introduced after the equality law of 1898.

The Brussels-Capital Region is bilingual; hence, both the French and Dutch names of the station—Bruxelles-Midi and Brussel-Zuid—are official. Outside Belgium, this often leads to the use of combined shorthands; for example in the Thomas Cook European Rail Timetable, Brussels-South is designated as Brussels Midi/Zuid; NS (Dutch Railways) announce the station as Brussel Zuid/Midi.

== History ==
=== First station (1839–1869) ===
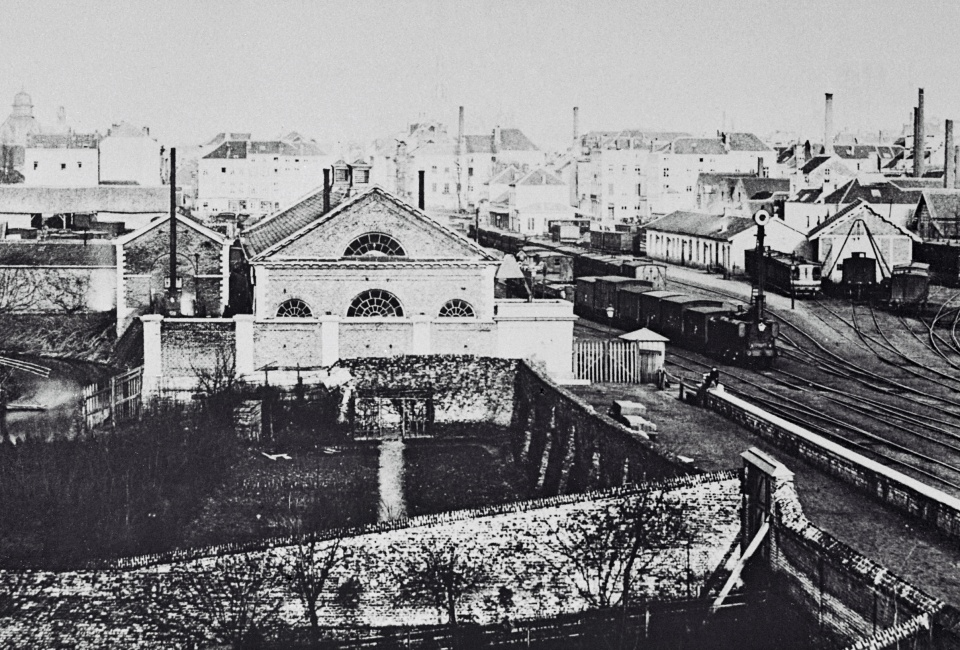
Bogards' railway station (1839), pictured c. 1860

A first station known as Bogards' railway station (French: Gare des Bogards, Dutch: Bogaardenstation) had existed, since 1839, near the Place Rouppe/Rouppeplein in the southern part of the City of Brussels, so-called for the former cloister of the Bogards' convent whose site it was built on, and to which the Rue des Bogards/Bogaardenstraat is now the only reference. This station, which quickly took the name "South Station" (French: Gare du Midi, Dutch: Zuidstation), served as the six-track terminus of the South Line, a southbound railway line linking Brussels to the industrial towns of Mons, Charleroi and La Louvière, at the heart of the Sillon industriel in Hainaut, Belgium, before crossing the French border (near Quiévrain), where a connecting line could reach Valenciennes, in northern France. The former presence of a station at this location also explains the unusual width of the current Avenue de Stalingrad/Stalingradlaan, which goes from the Place Rouppe to the Small Ring (Brussels' inner ring road), a reminder of the train tracks that used to run in its middle.

=== Second station (1869–1949) ===
The Belgian railway network grew rapidly during the second half of the 19th century, becoming the densest in continental Europe. By then, Brussels-North and Brussels-South had become the primary railway stations in Brussels (Brussels-North slowly supplanted the original Allée Verte/Groendreef railway station near the same site). However, they were joined only by an inadequate single track running along what is today the Small Ring. Many proposals were put forward to link the two stations more substantially. A law was finally passed in 1909 mandating a direct connection; however, the final project would not be completed until nearly half a century later.

Around 1860, the South Station had reached saturation point and its location too close to the city centre began to cause problems, so the authorities decided to demolish it. A new monumental station, designed by the architect Auguste Payen in neoclassical style, opened in 1869, a short distance south from the original site, on the territory of the municipality of Saint-Gilles/Sint-Gillis. The entrance was shaped like a triumphal arch, richly decorated with sculptures by Joseph Ducaju. In 1880, an allegorical statue of Nike, the Greek goddess of victory riding a chariot, by the sculptor Louis Samain, was placed on the roof of the station as a tribute to railway engineering. In front of the station, a large public square, known as the Place de la Constitution/Grondwetplein ("Constitution Square"), was created, acting as an entry to the city for its many commuters.

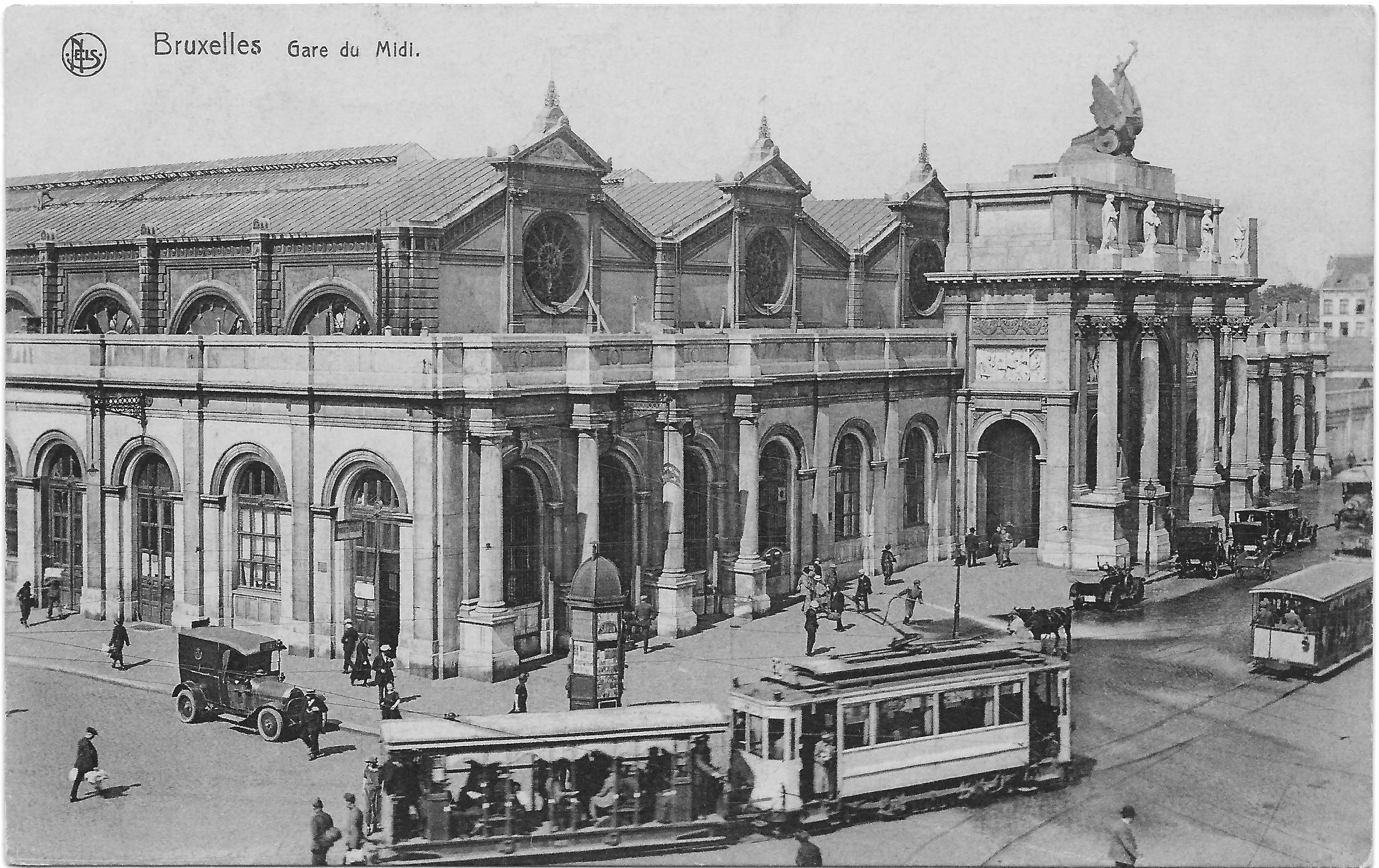
The second Brussels-South railway station (1869), pictured in 1927

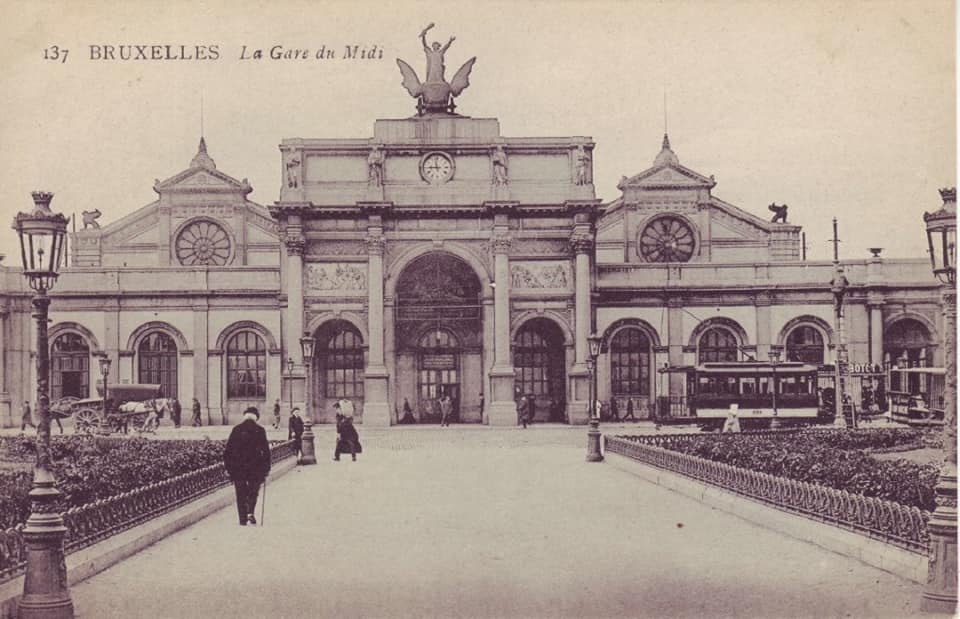
The second station's main façade and triumphal arch, c. 1920

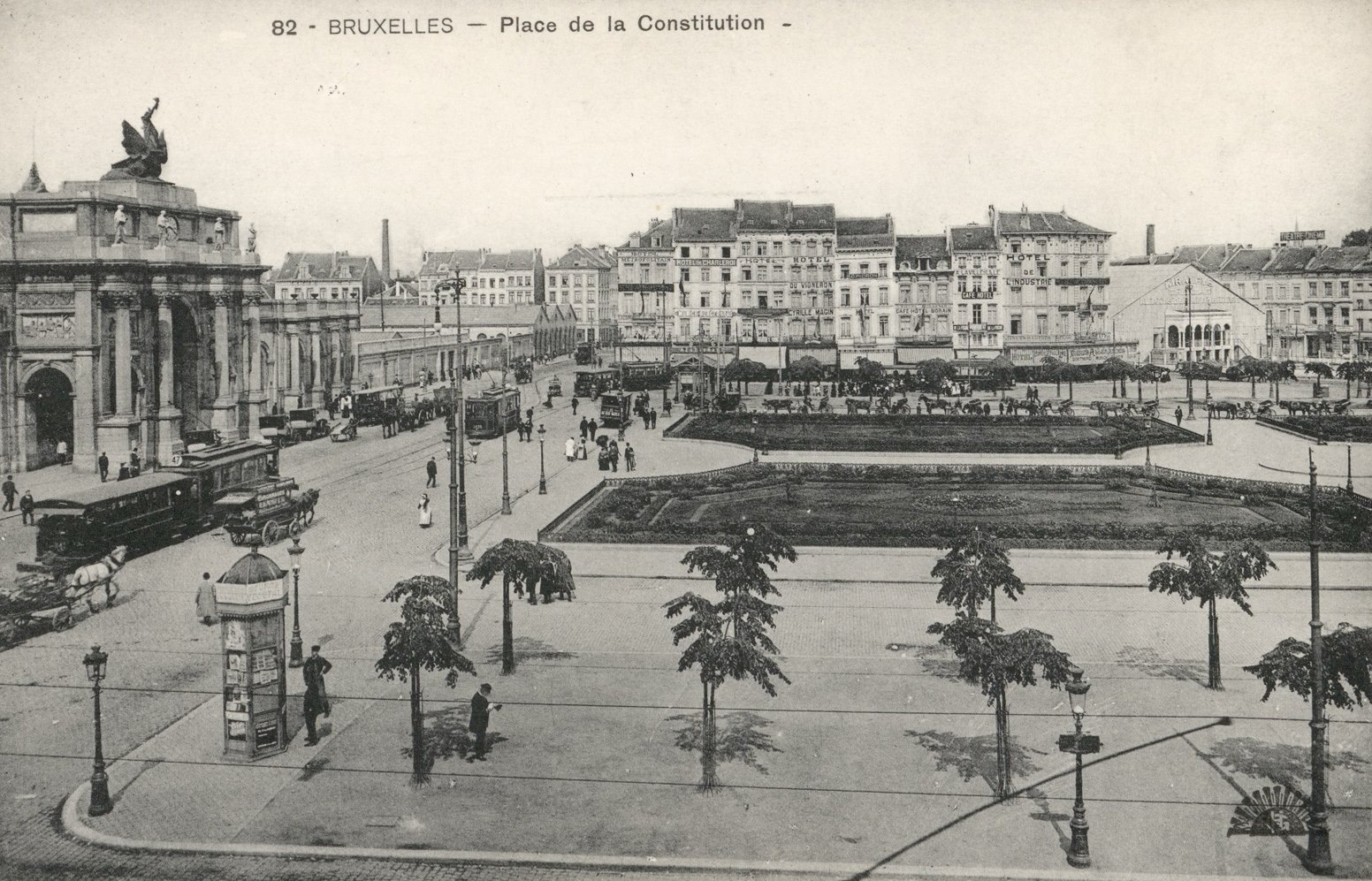
The Place de la Constitution/Grondwetplein in front of the second station

=== Current station (1949–present) ===
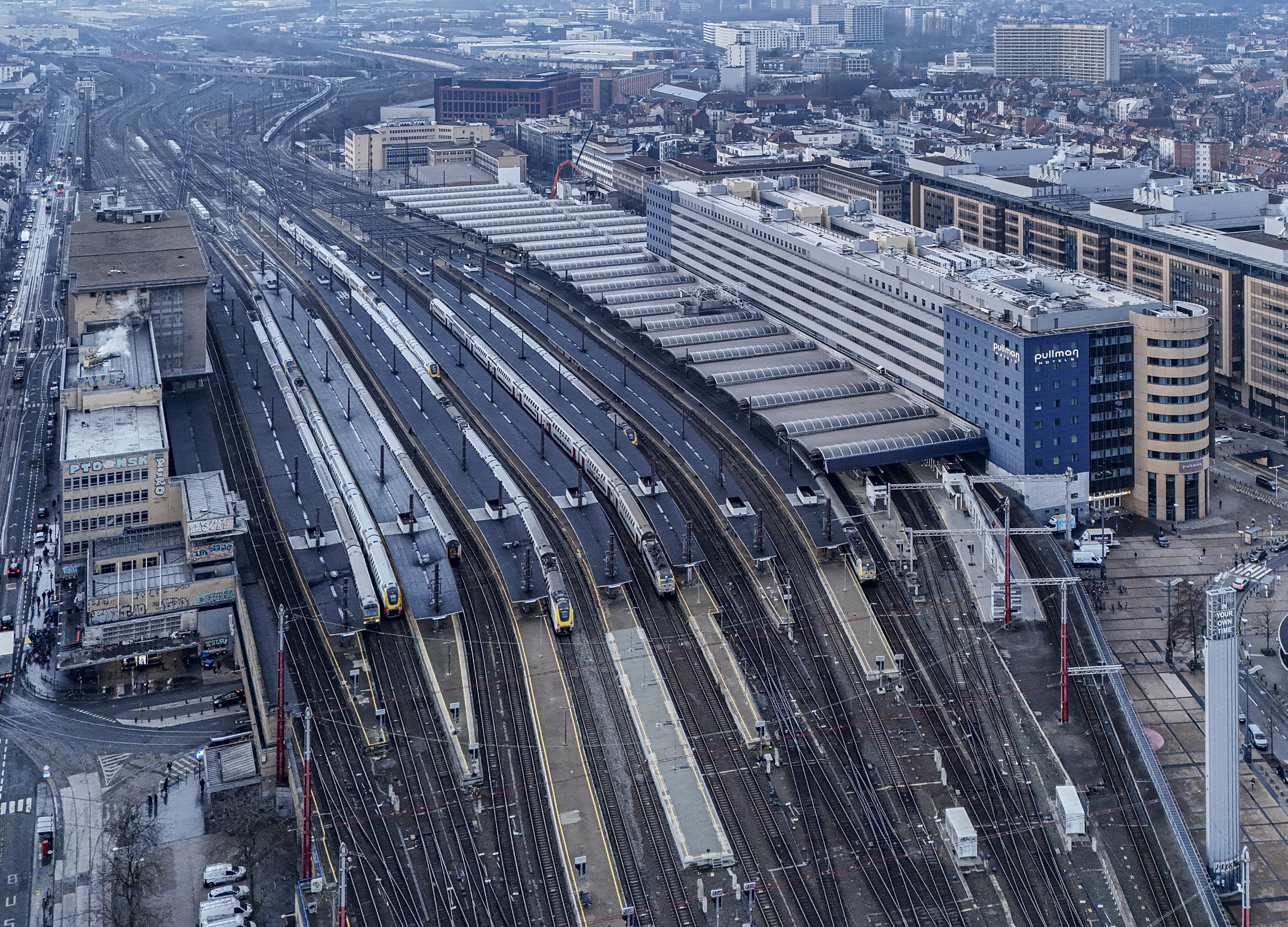
Aerial view of Brussels-South railway station in 2026

Payen's terminal station was itself demolished in 1949, as part of the North–South connection project, and replaced by a transit station on its present site along the Avenue Fonsny/Fonsnylaan. Most of the current buildings were erected between 1939 and 1954, in post-war functionalist style, from plans by architects Adrien and Yvan Blomme and Fernand Petit. Work on the connection also led to the station's immediate surroundings to be reorganised. The railway tracks were raised 6 metres (20 ft) and extended onto a viaduct towards the city centre, with shops under it and a covered street; the Rue Couverte/Bedektestraat (formerly the Rue de l'Argonne/Argonnestraat), along which trams run.

Since the 1990s, the South Station and the district adjacent to it have undergone profound transformation. The rear part of the station, designed in 1992 by the architect Marc De Vreese, and built in front of the Place Victor Horta/Victor Hortaplein, serves as a terminal for high-speed trains. On Saint-Gilles' side, expropriation plans have led, since 2012, to the creation of modern office blocks constituting a tertiary economic sector along the Avenue Fonsny, as well as extensions of the station along the Rue de France/Frankrijkstraat, the two arteries that surround the station. This business centre located a stone's throw from the city centre, is intended, in the spirit of the public authorities, to mirror the Northern Quarter business district (also called Little Manhattan), located near the North Station, on the opposite side of the city centre.

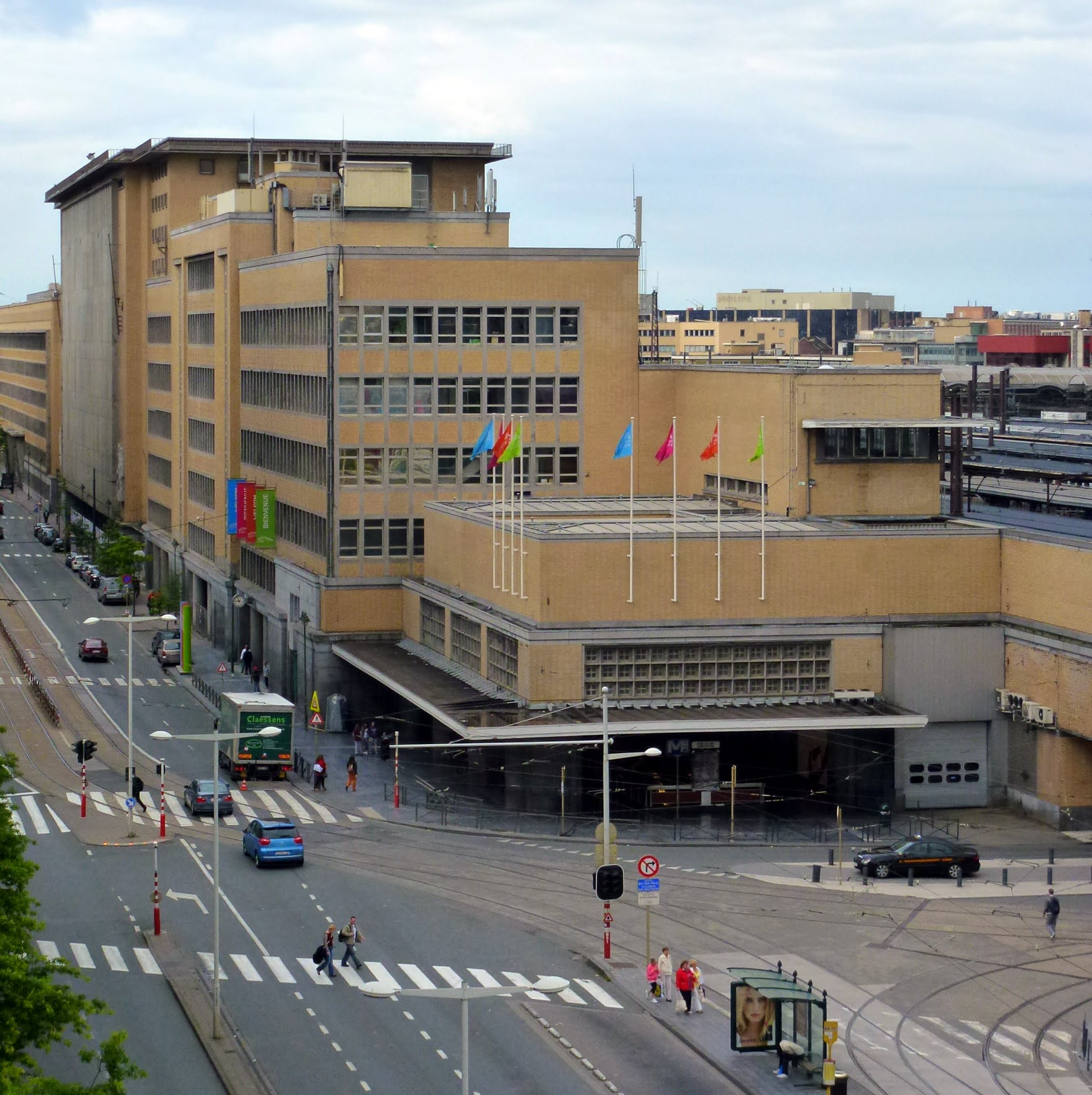
The third (current) Brussels-South station (1952) on the Avenue Fonsny/Fonsnylaan

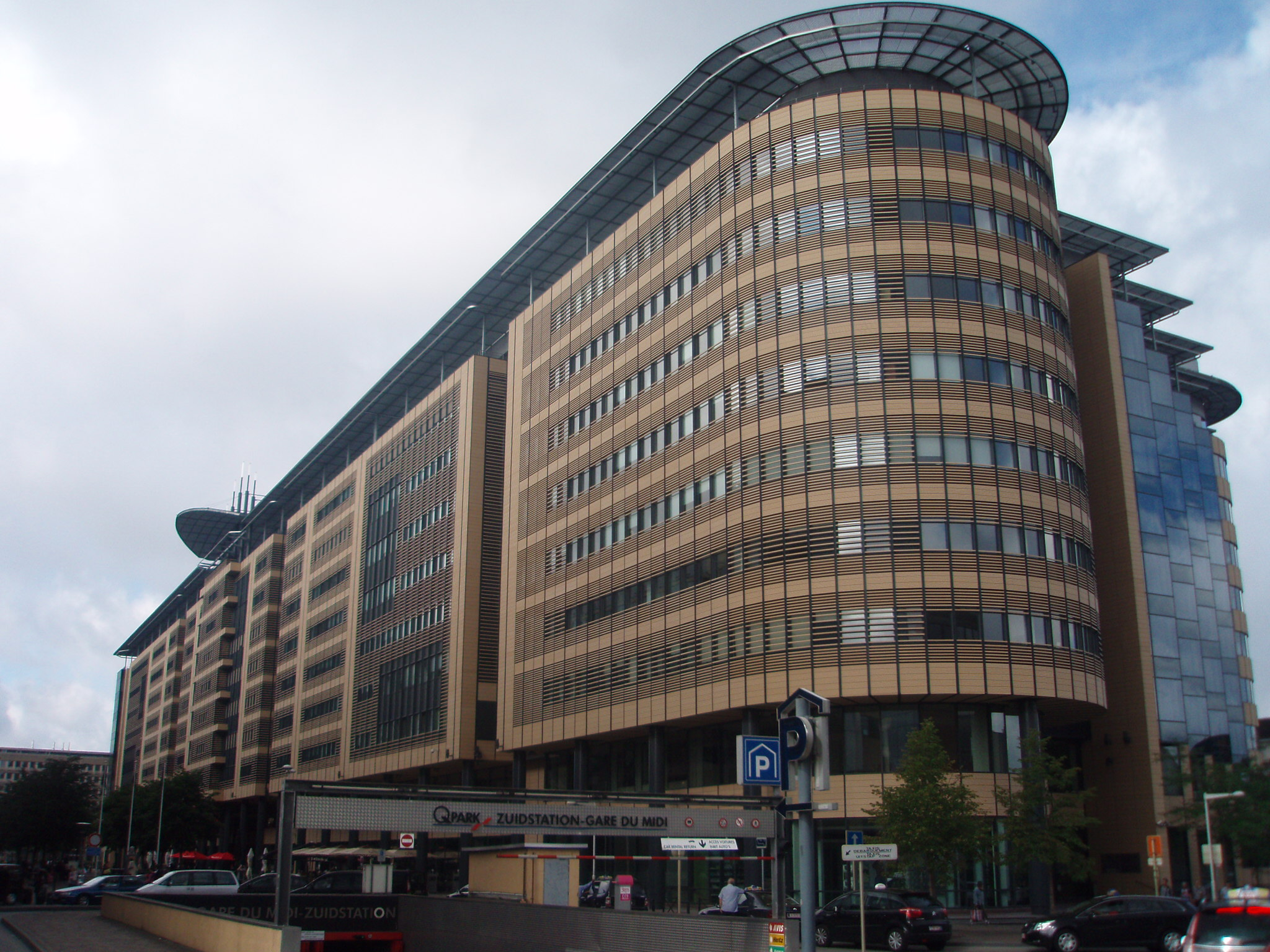
Terminal building (1992) on the Place Victor Horta/Victor Hortaplein

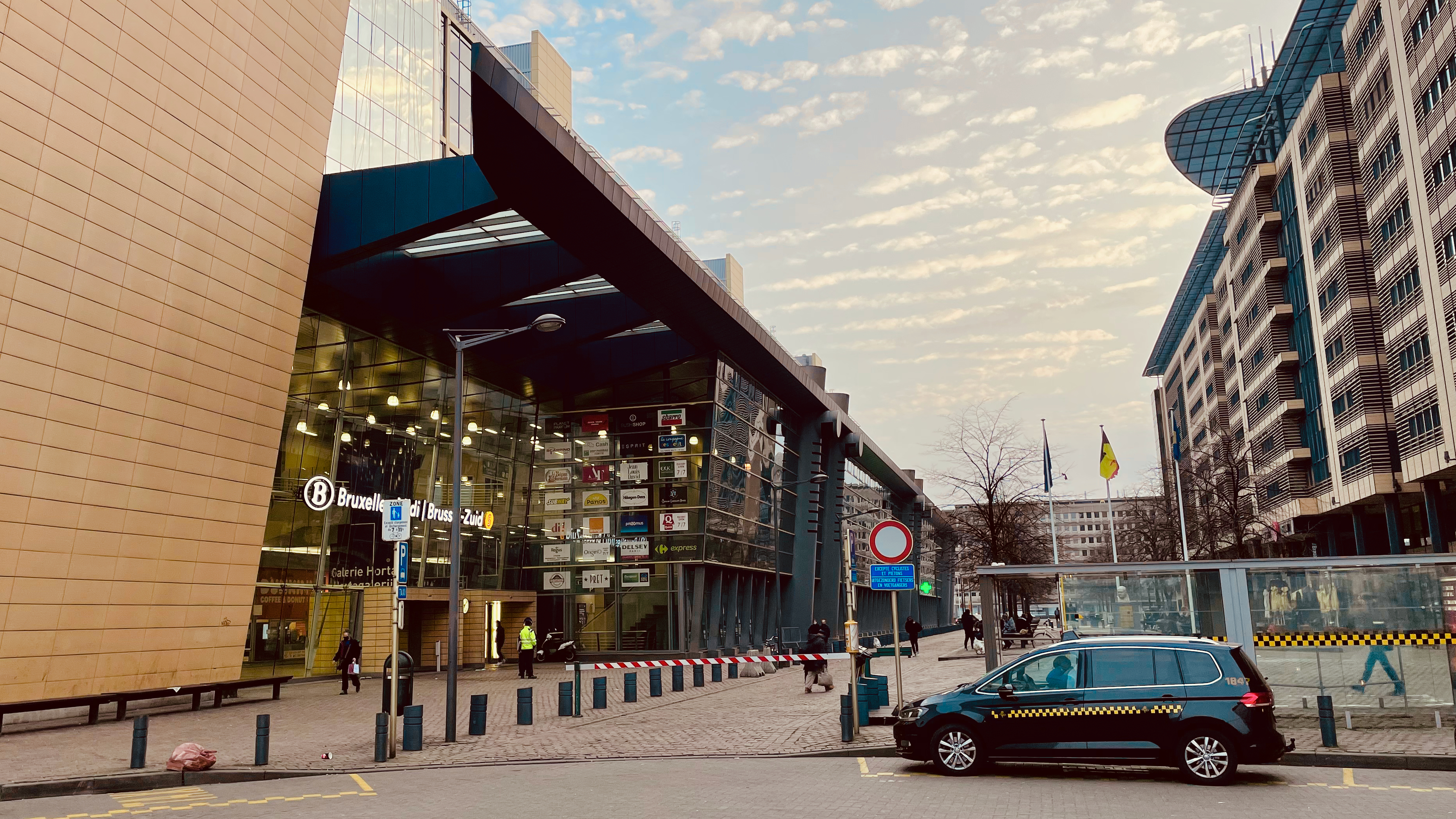
Brussels-South railway station entrance

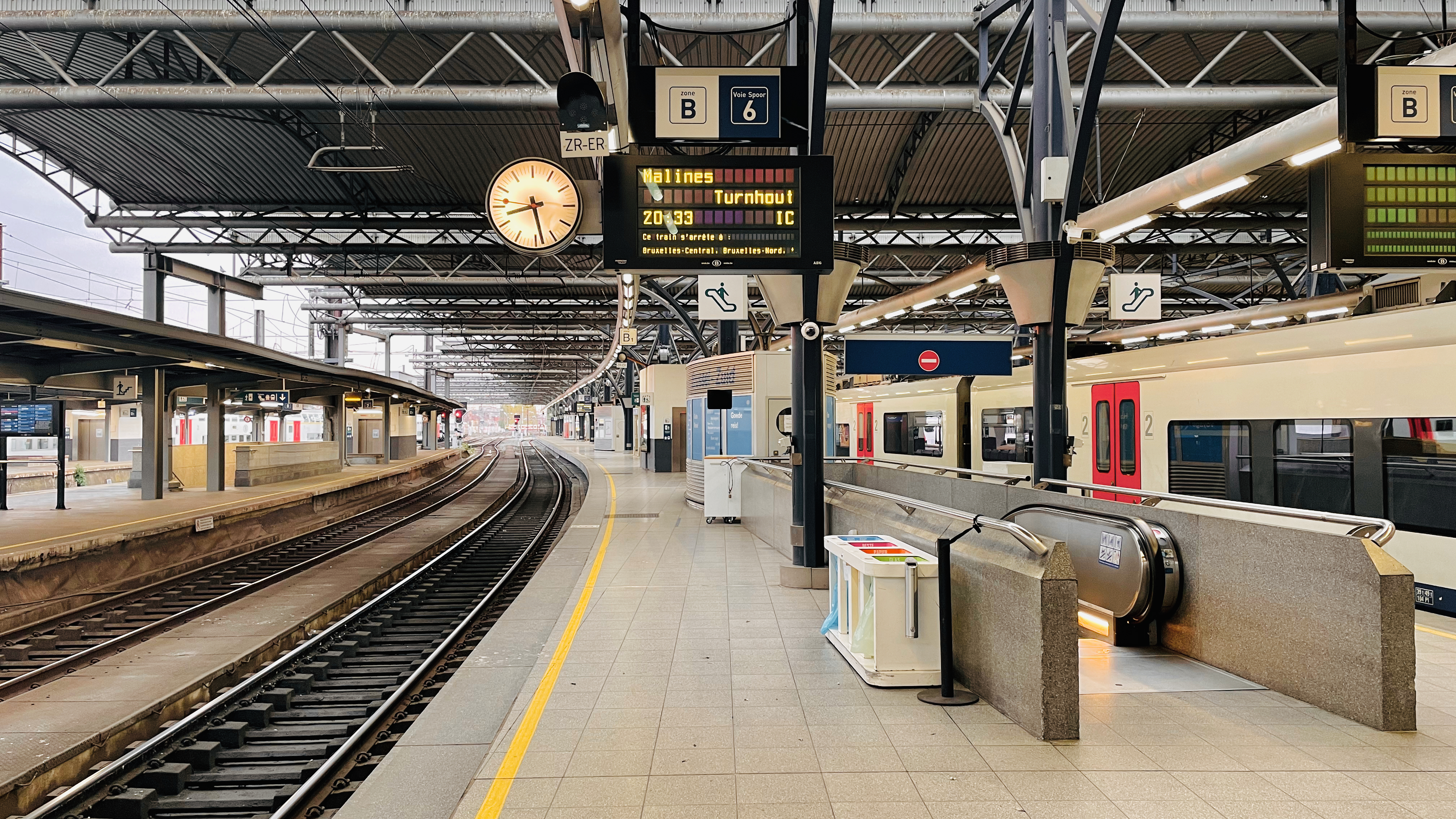
View of the South Station's platforms and tracks

== Features ==
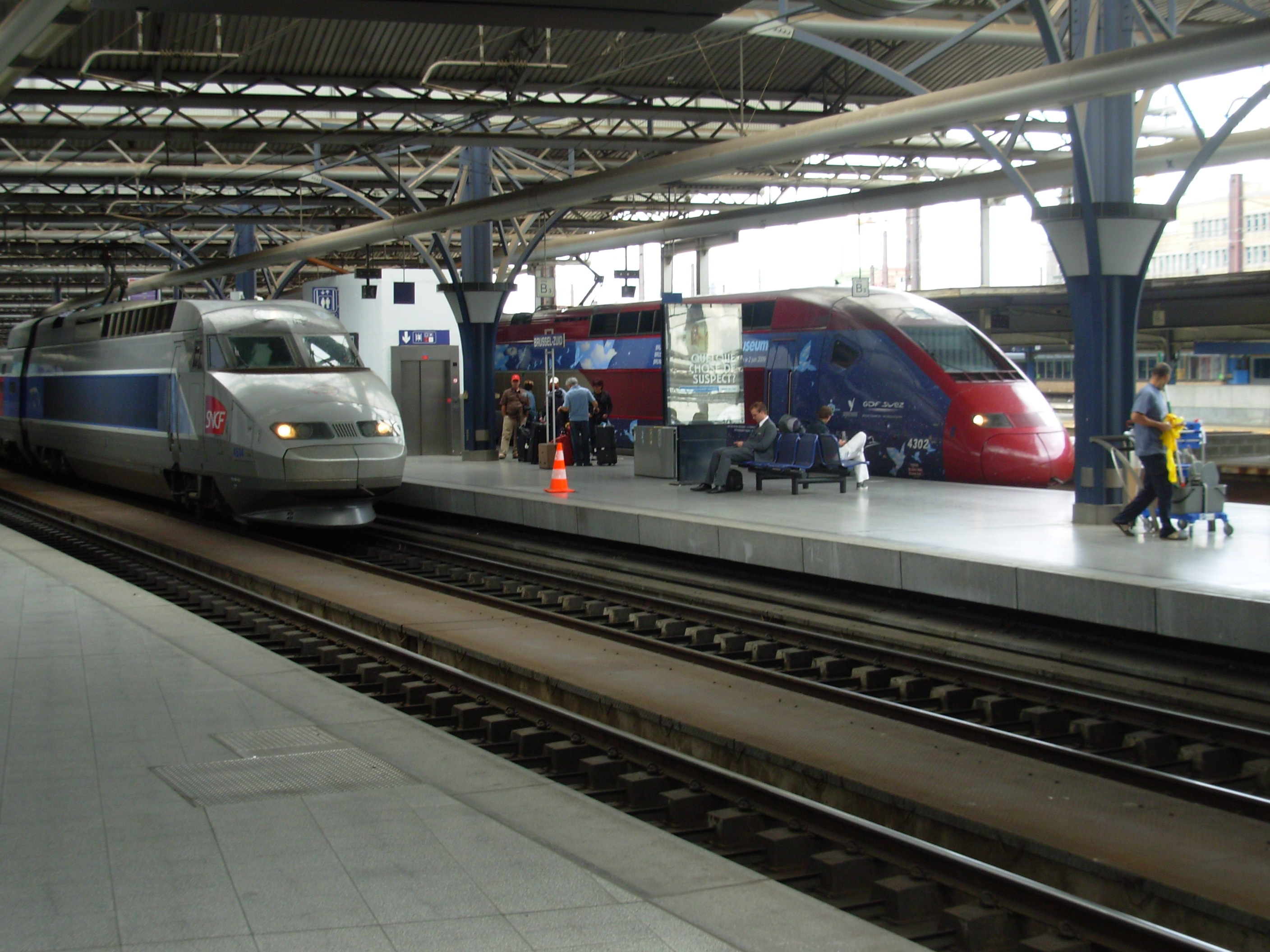
TGV and Thalys sharing a platform at Brussels-South railway station

The station is surrounded by the Avenue Fonsny/Fonsnylaan to the east, the Rue de France/Frankrijkstraat to the west, the Rue Couverte/Bedektestraat to the north and the Rue des Vétérinaires/Veeartsenstraat to the south. In the 1990s, the Eurostar terminal was added on the Rue de France's side. This part contains two bay platforms with no onward northbound connection.

A tripartite agreement was signed by Belgium, France and the UK on 15 May 1993, which permitted British officials to carry out pre-embarkation immigration controls for passengers travelling on direct Eurostar train services from Brussels to London and Belgian officials to carry out pre-embarkation immigration controls at London Waterloo International (and subsequently St Pancras International) station for passengers travelling in the other direction. As a result of this agreement, juxtaposed controls were set up in the station. On 1 October 2004, an administrative arrangement was signed by Belgium, France and the UK to extend juxtaposed controls to Eurostar services between London and Brussels which make a stop in Lille.

Eurostar passengers travelling to the UK clear exit checks from the Schengen Area (carried out by the Belgian Federal Police) as well as UK entry checks (conducted by the UK Border Force) in the station before boarding their train. On the other hand, Eurostar passengers travelling to Lille Europe or Calais-Fréthun remain within the Schengen Area and are therefore not subject to border checks. Accordingly, they go through a different departure area in the station (bypassing the juxtaposed controls for passengers heading to the UK) and travel in a separate designated coach (available in standard class only) controlled by security guards, who ensure that all of these passengers disembark at Lille/Calais before the train continues to the UK.

== Train services ==
The station is served by the following services:

- High speed services (Eurostar) London - Lille - Brussels
- High speed services (Eurostar) London - Brussels - Rotterdam - Amsterdam
- High speed services (Eurostar) Amsterdam - Rotterdam - Antwerp - Brussels - Paris
- High speed services (Eurostar) Amsterdam - Schiphol Airport - Rotterdam - Antwerp - Brussels - Charles de Gaulle Airport - Paris Disneyland
- High speed services (Eurostar) Dortmund - Essen - Düsseldorf - Cologne - Aachen - Liège - Brussels - Paris
- High speed services (Eurostar) Amsterdam - Rotterdam - Antwerp - Brussels - Lille
- High speed services (Eurostar) Amsterdam - Rotterdam - Antwerp - Brussels - Chambéry - Bourg-Saint-Maurice (seasonal, winter)
- High speed services (Eurostar) Amsterdam - Rotterdam - Antwerp - Brussels - Avignon - Marseille (seasonal, summer)
- High speed services (Intercity Express) Brussels - Liège - Aachen - Cologne - Frankfurt
- High speed services (TGV inOui) Brussels - Lille - Charles de Gaulle Airport - Lyon - Avignon - Marseille
- High speed services (TGV inOui) Brussels - Lille - Charles de Gaulle Airport - Lyon - Nîmes - Montpellier - Perpignan
- High speed services (TGV inOui) Brussels - Lille - Charles de Gaulle Airport - Strasbourg
- High speed services (EC) Amsterdam - Rotterdam - Breda - Antwerp - Brussels Airport - Brussels
- High speed services (ECD) Lelystad - Almere - Amsterdam - Rotterdam - Antwerp - Brussels
- European Sleeper service Brussels - Amsterdam - Berlin - Prague
- Intercity services (IC 01) Ostend - Bruges - Ghent - Brussels - Leuven - Liège - Welkenraedt - Eupen
- Intercity services (IC 03) Blankenberge - Bruges - Ghent - Brussels - Leuven - Hasselt - Genk
- Intercity services (IC 16) Brussels - Namur - Arlon - Luxembourg
- Intercity services (IC 05) Essen - Antwerp - Mechelen - Brussels - Nivelles - Charleroi (weekdays)
- Intercity services (IC 06) Tournai - Ath - Halle - Brussels - Brussels Airport
- Intercity services (IC 06A) Mons - Braine-le-Comte - Brussels - Brussels Airport
- Intercity services (IC 07) Charleroi - Nivelles - Brussels - Antwerp (weekdays)
- Intercity services (IC 11) Binche - Braine-le-Comte - Halle - Brussels - Mechelen - Turnhout (weekdays)
- Intercity services (IC 11) Binche - Braine-le-Comte - Halle - Brussels - Scharbeek (weekdays)
- Intercity services (IC 12) Kortrijk - Ghent - Brussels - Leuven - Liège - Welkenraedt (weekdays)
- Intercity services (IC 13) Kortrijk - Denderleeuw - Brussels - Schaarbeek (weekdays)
- Intercity services (IC 14) Quiévrain - Mons - Braine-le-Comte - Brussels - Leuven - Liège (weekdays)
- Intercity services (IC 16/34) Brussels - Namur - Arlon - Luxembourg
- Intercity services (IC 17) Brussels - Namur - Dinant (weekdays)
- Intercity services (IC 18) Brussels - Namur - Liège (weekdays)
- Intercity services (IC 20) Ghent - Aalst - Brussels - Hasselt - Tongeren (weekdays)
- Intercity services (IC 20) Ghent - Aalst - Brussels - Dendermonde - Lokeren (weekdays)
- Intercity services (IC 22) Antwerp - Mechelen - Brussels
- Intercity services (IC 23) Ostend - Bruges - Kortrijk - Zottegem - Brussels - Brussels Airport
- Intercity services (IC 23A) Knokke - Bruges - Ghent - Brussels - Brussels Airport
- Intercity services (IC 26) Kortrijk - Tournai - Halle - Brussels - Dendermonde - Lokeren - Sint Niklaas (weekdays)
- Intercity services (IC 29) Gent - Aalst - Brussels - Brussels Airport - Leuven - Landen (weekdays)
- Intercity services (IC 29) De Panne - Gent - Aalst - Brussels - Brussels Airport - Leuven - Landen (weekdays)
- Intercity services (IC 31) Antwerp - Mechelen - Brussels (weekdays)
- Intercity services (IC 31) Antwerp - Mechelen - Brussels - Nivelles - Charleroi (weekdays)
- Regional services (S1) Antwerp - Mechelen - Brussels - Waterloo - Nivelles (weekdays)
- Regional services (S1) Antwerp - Mechelen - Brussels (weekdays)
- Regional services (S1) Brussels - Waterloo - Nivelles (weekdays)
- Regional services (S2) Leuven - Brussels - Halle - Braine-le-Comte
- Regional services (S3) Dendermonde - Brussels - Denderleeuw - Zottegem (weekdays)
- Regional services (S3) Schaarbeek - Brussels - Denderleeuw - Zottegem (weekdays)
- Regional services (S6) Aalst - Denderleeuw - Geraardsbergen - Halle - Brussels - Schaarbeek (weekdays)
- Regional services (S6) Denderleeuw - Geraardsbergen - Halle - Brussels - Schaarbeek (weekdays)
- Regional services (S8) Brussels - Etterbeek - Ottignies - Louvain-le-Neuve
- Regional services (S10) Dendermonde - Brussels - Denderleeuw - Aalst

== Metro and premetro station ==
The metro station, called Gare du Midi/Zuidstation, opened on 2 October 1988 as (at that time) the terminus of metro line 2 from Simonis. Line 2 has since been extended beyond Brussels-South to Clemenceau in 1993, Delacroix in 2006, and Gare de l'Ouest/Weststation in 2009. Since 1993, the station also accommodates premetro (underground tram) services at separate platforms, with cross-platform interchange between metro and premetro in both directions.

== Connections ==
=== International buses ===
Since 23 July 2012, SNCF's international coach network, OUIBUS (taken over by BlaBlaBus in 2018), has served Brussels-South.

- Paris - Lille - Brussels
- Amsterdam - Brussels (from 28 April 2014)
- Amsterdam - Brussels - London (from 28 April 2014)

=== Other bus services ===
A shuttle service by Flibco to Brussels South Charleroi Airport leaves from a stop located on the Rue de France/Frankrijkstraat.

== Places of interest ==
The South Tower, the tallest building in Belgium, stands in front of the station's main exit (the crossroad of the Avenue Fonsny/Fonsnylaan and the Rue Couverte/Bedektestraat) and houses the Belgian Federal Pensions Service (FPS).

== See also ==
- List of railway stations in Belgium
- List of TGV stations
- Rail transport in Belgium
- Transport in Brussels
- History of Brussels
