= Uccle-Calevoet railway station =

Railway station in Brussels, Belgium

Uccle-Calevoet Ukkel-Kalevoet
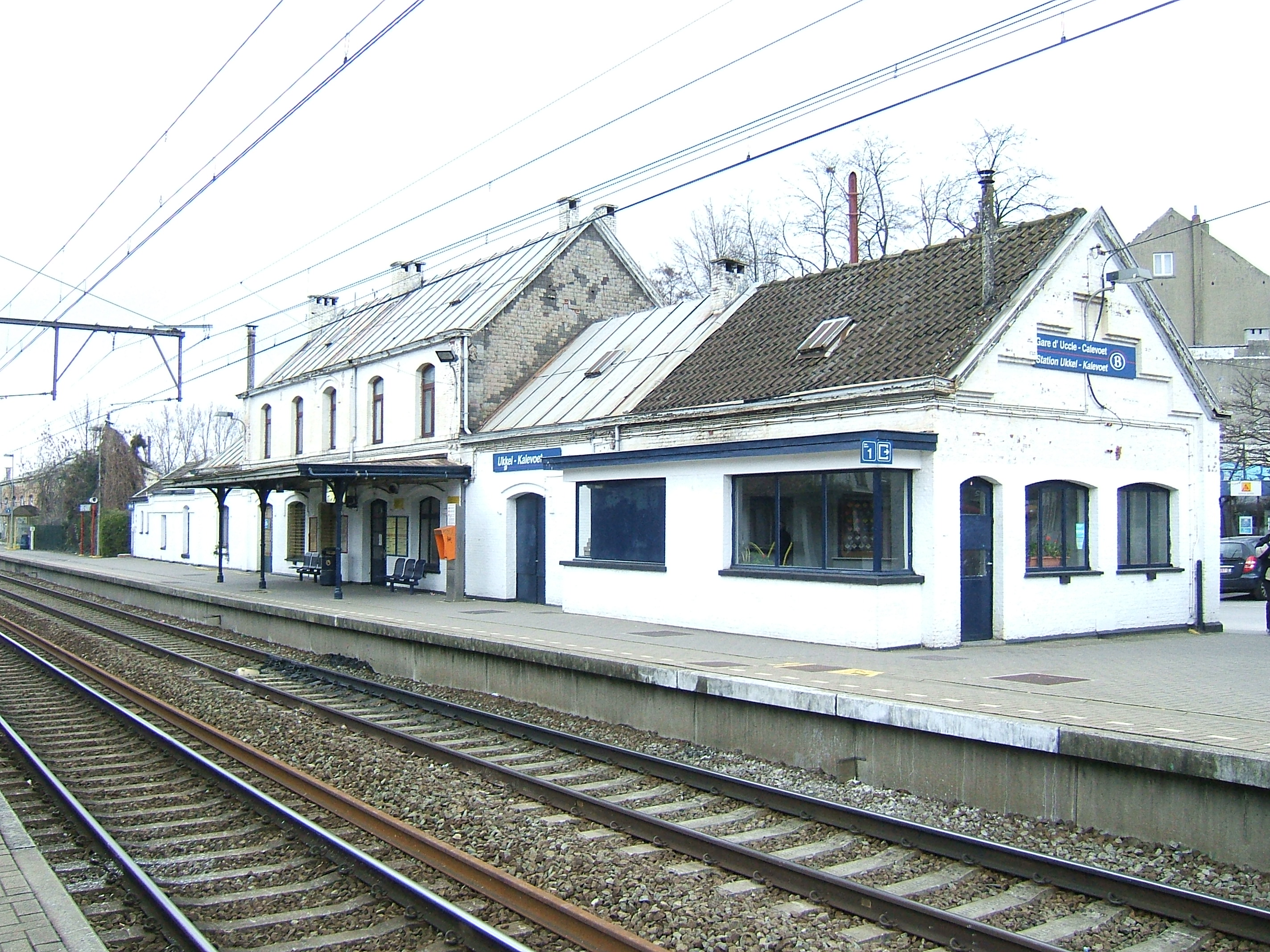
- Uccle-Calevoet/Ukkel-Kalevoet railway station

General information
- Location: Uccle, Brussels-Capital Region; Belgium
- Coordinates: 50.7919°N 4.3321°E
- System: Railway Station
- Owner: SNCB/NMBS
- Operator: SNCB/NMBS
- Platforms: 2

Other information
- Station code: FTE

History
- Opened: 20 September 1873; 152 years ago
Location
- Location within Belgium Location within Europe

Uccle-Calevoet railway station (French: Gare d'Uccle-Calevoet [ɡaʁ dykl kalvut]) or Ukkel-Kalevoet railway station (Dutch: Station Ukkel-Kalevoet [staːˈɕɔn ˈʏkəl ˈkaːləˌvut]) (Note: Officially Uccle-Calevoet/Ukkel-Kalevoet (French: Uccle-Calevoet; Dutch: Ukkel-Kalevoet)) is a railway station in the municipality of Uccle in Brussels, Belgium. The station is operated by the National Railway Company of Belgium (NMBS/SNCB) and located on line 124, between Uccle-Stalle and Linkebeek railway stations. It is named after the Calevoet/Kalevoet neighbourhood in Uccle.

Trains calling at this station are local trains running from Nivelles to Brussels-North and Antwerpen-Centraal. The station is connected to Brussels tram route 51, as well as bus routes 43 and 60.

== Train services ==
The station is served by the following service(s):

- Brussels RER services (S1) Antwerp – Mechelen – Brussels – Waterloo – Nivelles (weekdays)
- Brussels RER services (S1) Brussels – Waterloo – Nivelles (weekends)

== See also ==
- List of railway stations in Belgium
- Rail transport in Belgium
- Transport in Brussels
- History of Brussels

Preceding station	NMBS/SNCB	Following station
Uccle-Stalle towards Antwerpen-Centraal	S 1 weekdays	Linkebeek towards Nivelles
Uccle-Stalle towards Bruxelles-Nord / Brussel-Noord	S 1 weekends	Linkebeek towards Nivelles
