= Forest-East railway station =

Railway station in Brussels, Belgium

Forest-East
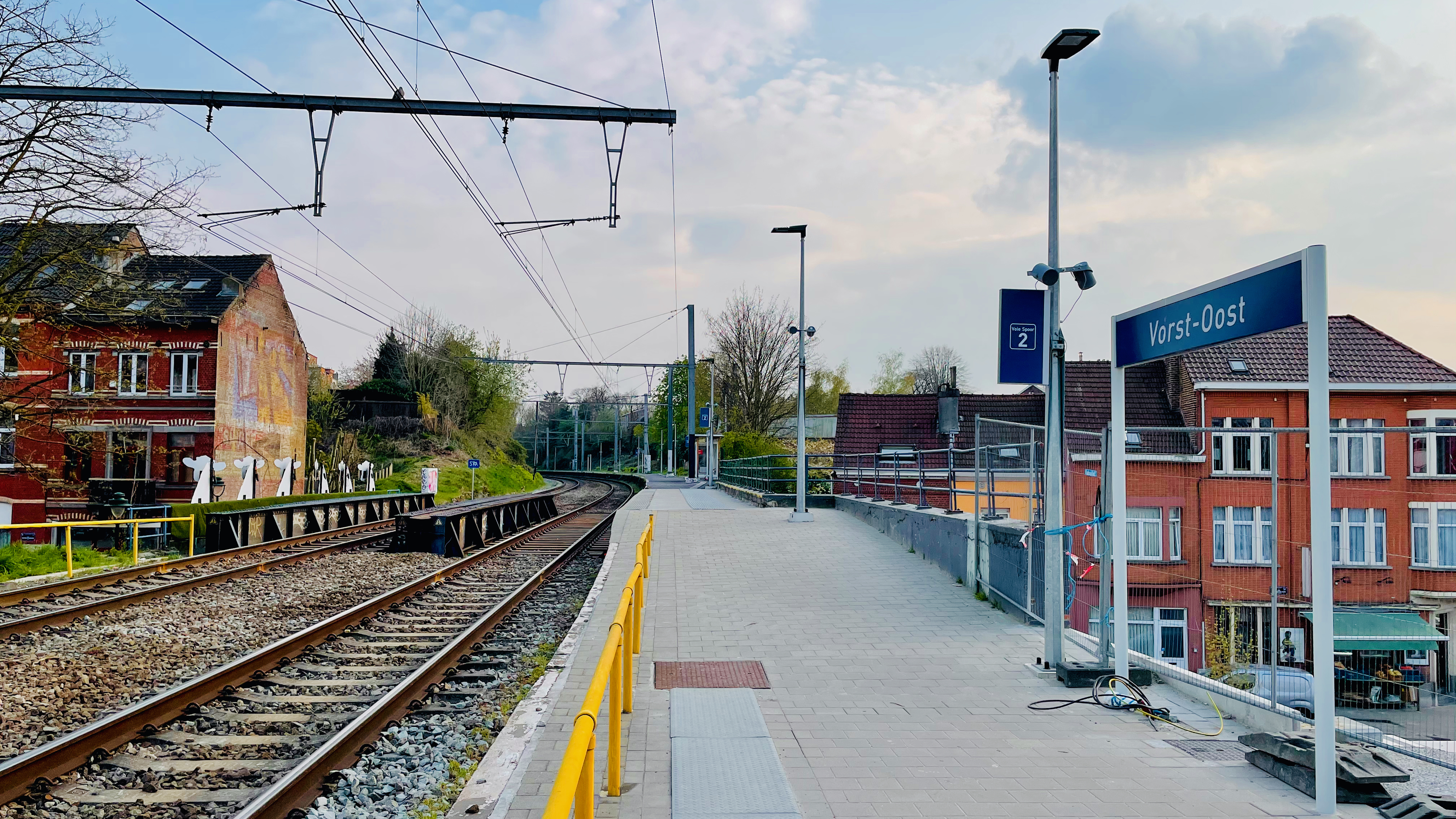
- Forest-East railway station

General information
- Location: Forest, Brussels-Capital Region; Belgium
- Coordinates: 50.8097°N 4.3208°E
- System: Railway Station
- Owner: SNCB/NMBS
- Operator: SNCB/NMBS
- Line: 124 (Brussels-Charleroi)
- Platforms: 2
- Tracks: 2

Other information
- Station code: FOST

History
- Opened: 1873; 153 years ago

Passengers
- 2014: 224 per day
Location
- Location within Belgium Location within Europe

Forest-East railway station (French: Gare de Forest-Est; Dutch: Station Vorst-Oost) (Note: Officially Forest-East (French: Forest-Est; Dutch: Vorst-Oost)) is a railway station in the municipality of Forest in Brussels, Belgium. The station, operated by the National Railway Company of Belgium (NMBS/SNCB), is located on line 124, between Brussels-South and Uccle-Stalle railway stations.

== Train services ==
The station is served by the following service(s):

- Brussels RER services (S1) Antwerp - Mechelen - Brussels - Waterloo - Nivelles (weekdays)
- Brussels RER services (S1) Brussels - Waterloo - Nivelles (weekends)

Preceding station	NMBS/SNCB	Following station
Bruxelles-Midi / Brussel-Zuid towards Antwerpen-Centraal	S 1 weekdays	Uccle-Stalle towards Nivelles
Bruxelles-Midi / Brussel-Zuid towards Bruxelles-Nord / Brussel-Noord	S 1 weekends	Uccle-Stalle towards Nivelles

== See also ==
- List of railway stations in Belgium
- Rail transport in Belgium
- Transport in Brussels
- History of Brussels
