= Avenue Fonsny =

Street in Saint-Gilles, Belgium

Avenue Fonsny (French); Fonsnylaan (Dutch)
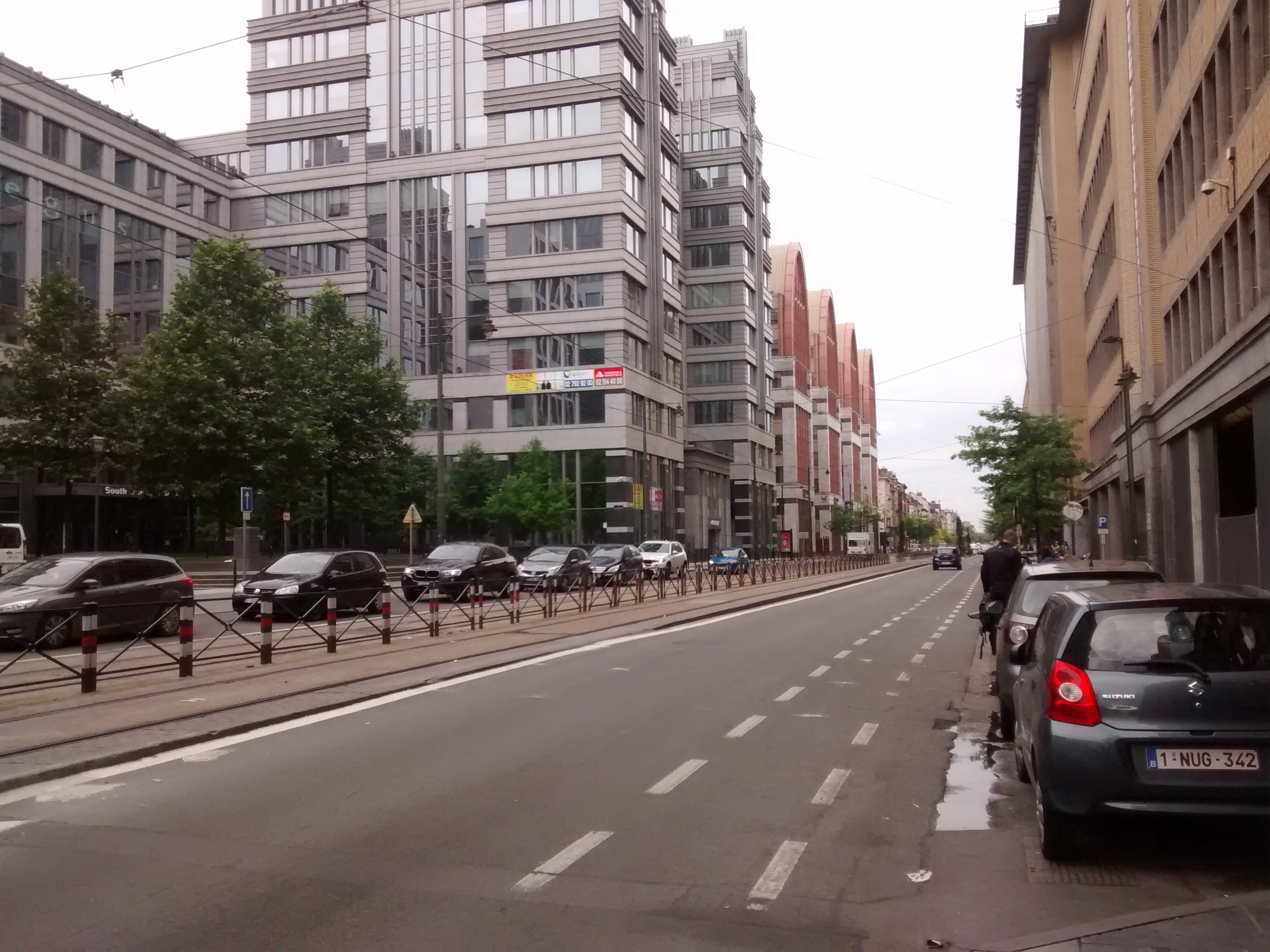
- The Avenue Fonsny/Fonsnylaan in Saint-Gilles, next to Brussels-South railway station

- Location within Brussels Location within Belgium
- Namesake: Jean-Toussaint Fonsny
- Type: Avenue
- Location: Saint-Gilles, Brussels-Capital Region, Belgium
- Postal code: 1060
- Coordinates: 50°50′01″N 04°20′07″E

Other
- Known for: Brussels-South railway station

The Avenue Fonsny (French) or Fonsnylaan (Dutch) is a major street in the Saint-Gilles municipality of Brussels, Belgium. It connects the Place de la Constitution/Grondwetplein on the south-west of the Small Ring (Brussels' inner ring road) to the municipality of Forest, where it is continued by the Avenue Van Volxem/Van Volxemlaan. It bears the name of a former mayor of Saint-Gilles, Jean-Toussaint Fonsny.

One entry to Brussels-South railway station is on the Avenue Fonsny. The street also runs parallel to railway line 96.

== See also ==
- List of streets in Brussels
- History of Brussels
- Belgium in the long nineteenth century
