= Gere =

Gere may refer to:

- Gere (surname)

== Other uses ==
- Gere, Aragon, Spain
- Gere and Freke, alternative spelling of Geri and Freki in Norse mythology
- Guere language, a Kru language of Ivory Coast

== See also ==
- Gère-Bélesten, a commune in Pyrénées-Atlantiques, France
- GERES (Group for the Environment, Renewable Energy and Solidarity), an international development NGO
