= Uccle-Stalle railway station =

Railway station in Belgium

Uccle-Stalle Ukkel-Stalle
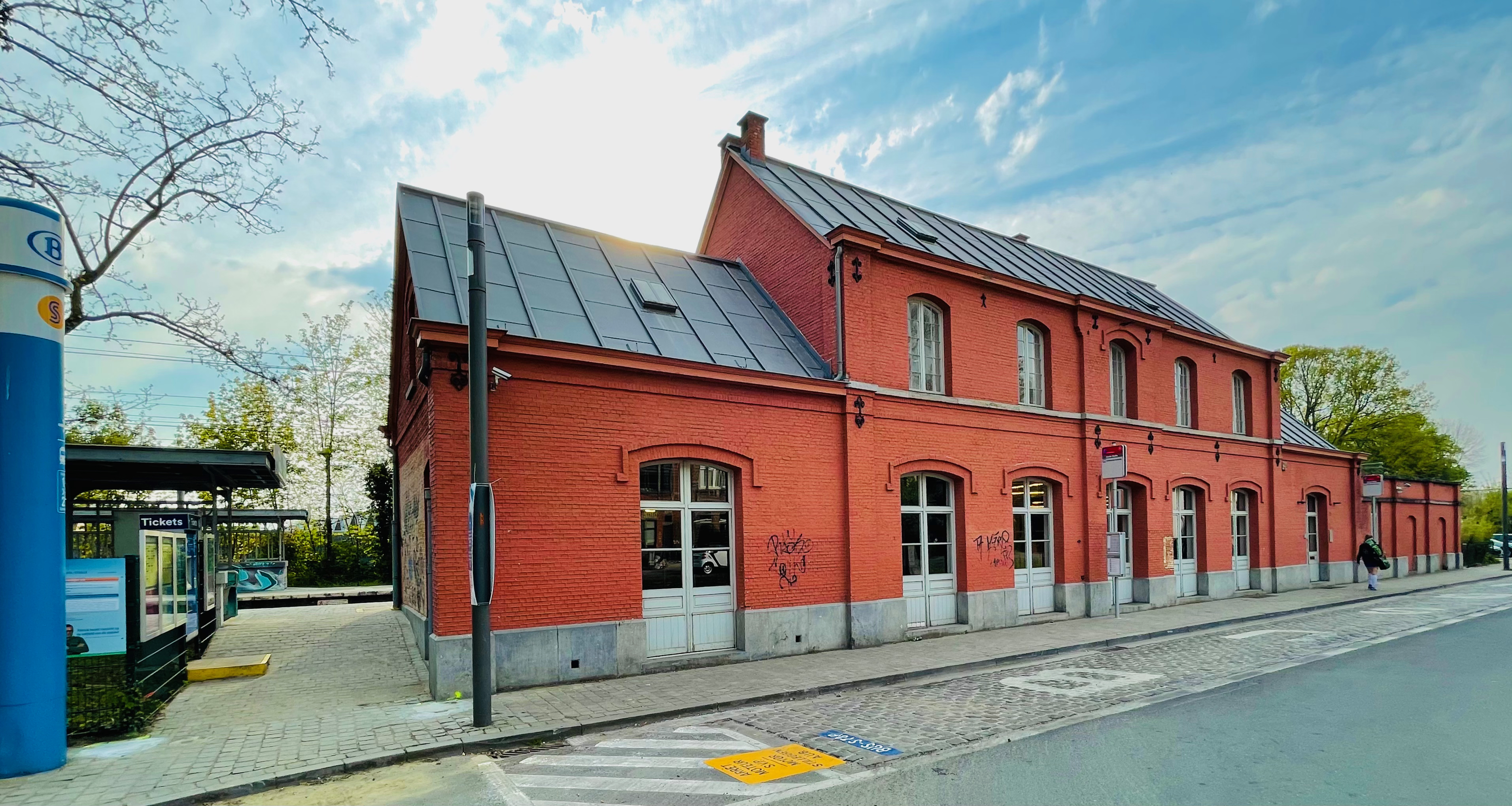
- Uccle-Stalle/Ukkel-Stalle railway station

General information
- Location: Uccle, Brussels-Capital Region; Belgium
- Coordinates: 50.8024°N 4.3240°E
- System: Railway Station
- Owner: SNCB/NMBS
- Operator: SNCB/NMBS
- Line: 124 (Brussels-Charleroi)
- Platforms: 2
- Tracks: 2

Other information
- Station code: FUS

History
- Opened: 20 September 1873; 152 years ago

Passengers
- 2014: 314 per day
Location
- Location within Belgium Location within Europe

Uccle-Stalle railway station (French: Gare d'Uccle-Stalle) or Ukkel-Stalle railway station (Dutch: Station Ukkel-Stalle) (Note: Officially Uccle-Stalle/Ukkel-Stalle (French: Uccle-Stalle; Dutch: Ukkel-Stalle)) is a railway station in the municipality of Uccle in Brussels, Belgium. The station is operated by the National Railway Company of Belgium (NMBS/SNCB) and located on line 124, between Forest-East and Uccle-Calevoet railway stations. It is named after the Stalle neighbourhood in Uccle.

Trains calling at this station are local trains running from Nivelles to Brussels-North and Antwerpen-Centraal.

== Train services ==
The station is served hourly by the following service(s):

- Brussels RER services (S1) Antwerp - Mechelen - Brussels - Waterloo - Nivelles (weekdays)
- Brussels RER services (S1) Brussels - Waterloo - Nivelles (weekends)

Preceding station	NMBS/SNCB	Following station
Forest-East towards Antwerpen-Centraal	S 1 weekdays	Uccle-Calevoet towards Nivelles
Forest-East towards Bruxelles-Nord / Brussel-Noord	S 1 weekends	Uccle-Calevoet towards Nivelles

== See also ==
- List of railway stations in Belgium
- Rail transport in Belgium
- Transport in Brussels
- History of Brussels
