= Gare (surname) =

Gare is a surname. Notable people with the name include:

- Anna Gare (born 1969), Australian musician, cook, author and television personality
- Arran Gare (born 1948), Australian philosopher
- Danny Gare (born 1954), Canadian NHL player, coach and personality
- Josh Gare (born 1992), English computer programmer and internet entrepreneur
- Lanny Gare (born 1978), Canadian-born German professional ice hockey centre
- Lou Gare (1939–2017), British jazz saxophonist
- Nene Gare (1919–1994) Australian writer and artist
- Øystein Gåre, (1954–2010) Norwegian footballer

== See also ==
- Gare (disambiguation)
- Gere (surname)
