= Gere (surname) =

Gere is a surname. Notable people with the name include:

- Ashlyn Gere (born 1959), stage name of American actress
- Charles March Gere (1869–1957), English painter, illustrator, stained glass and embroidery designer
- Charlie Gere, British academic of Lancaster University
- David Gere (born 1975), American film producer, actor, artist, business entrepreneur
- François Géré (born 1950), French historian
- Isaac Gere (1764–1849), American politician
- Olga Gere (born 1942), Yugoslav high jumper
- Richard Gere (born 1949), American actor
- Thomas P. Gere (1842–1912), Union Army officer in the American Civil War

== See also ==
- Gere (disambiguation)
- Gare (surname)
