= Braine-l'Alleud railway station =

Railway station in Walloon Brabant, Belgium

Braine-l'Alleud
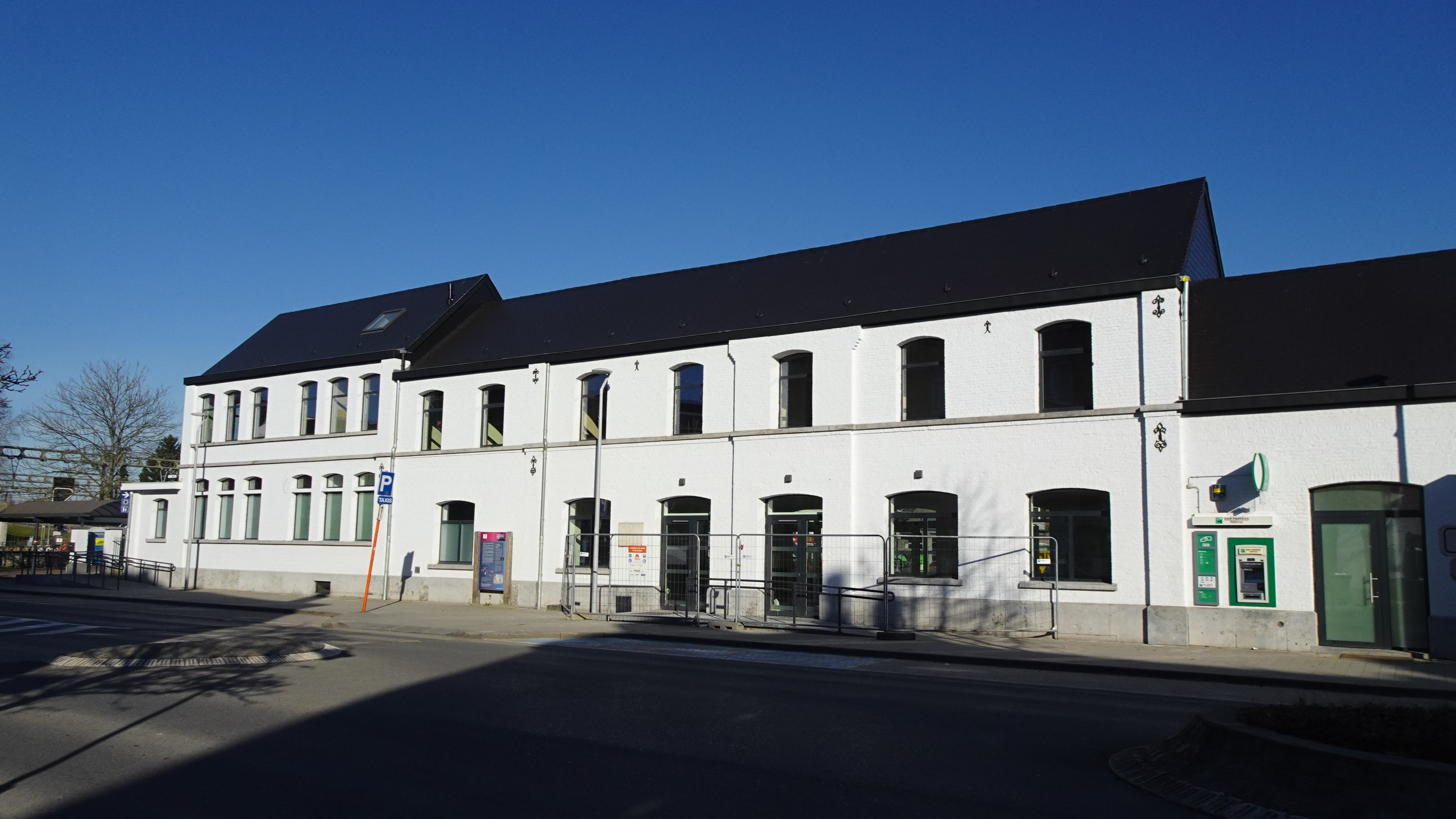
- Braine-l'Alleud railway station

General information
- Location: Place de la Gare 1, 1420 Braine l'Alleud; Belgium
- Coordinates: 50°41′5″N 4°22′32.78″E
- Elevation: 115
- System: Railway Station
- Owner: SNCB/NMBS
- Operator: SNCB/NMBS
- Lines: 115 (disused), 124
- Platforms: 4
- Tracks: 3

Construction
- Parking: Yes (free and paying)
- Cycle facilities: Yes (free parking)

Other information
- Station code: FBD
- Website: Official website

History
- Opened: 10 April 1874; 152 years ago
- Electrified: 19 November 1949
Location
- Location within Belgium Location within Europe

Braine-l'Alleud railway station (French: Gare de Braine-l'Alleud; Dutch: Station Eigenbrakel) (Note: Officially Braine-l'Alleud (French: Braine-l'Alleud; Dutch: Eigenbrake)) is a railway station in Braine-l'Alleud, Walloon Brabant, Belgium, operated by the National Railway Company of Belgium (SNCB/NMBS). The station is located on railway line 124, from Brussels-South to Charleroi-Central.

The station was open for service in 1874 by the Belgian State Railways. As a station of the SNCB/NMBS, it is served by the following types of trains: InterCity (IC), S Train (S) and Rush Hour trains (P).

== Train services ==
The station is served by the following services:

- Intercity services (IC-05 (4500 - 4549) Charleroi - Nivelles - Brussels - Mechelen - Antwerp
- Intercity services (IC-07 (2000 - 2049) Charleroi - Nivelles - Brussels - Mechelen - Antwerp
- Intercity services (IC-27 (4000 - 4049) Charleroi - Nivelles - Braine-l'Alleud - Brussels-Luxembourg - Brussels-Schuman - Bordet - Brussels Airport
- Brussels RER services (S1) Antwerp - Mechelen - Brussels - Waterloo - Nivelles
- Brussels RER services (S1) Brussels-North - Brussels-Central Brussels-South - Waterloo - Nivelles (weekends)
- Brussels RER services (S9) (Landen -) Leuven - Brussels-Schuman - Brussels-Luxembourg - Braine-l'Alleud (weekdays only)

Preceding station	NMBS/SNCB	Following station
Bruxelles-Midi / Brussel-Zuid towards Antwerpen-Centraal	IC 05	Nivelles towards Charleroi-Sud
Bruxelles-Midi / Brussel-Zuid towards Antwerpen-Centraal	IC 07	Nivelles towards Charleroi-Sud
Bruxelles-Midi / Brussel-Zuid towards Brussels National Airport	IC 27	Nivelles towards Charleroi-Sud
Waterloo towards Antwerpen-Centraal	S 1 weekdays	Lillios towards Nivelles
Waterloo towards Bruxelles-Nord / Brussel-Noord	S 1 weekends	Lillios towards Nivelles
Waterloo towards Leuven	S 9 weekdays	Terminus

The Brussels Regional Express Network (RER/GEN) services (S9) is running its full service since Monday 4 April 2016. The delay was due to delayed works on the Schuman-Josaphat tunnel. An updated map can be found on the SNCB/NMBS's website.

== Gallery ==
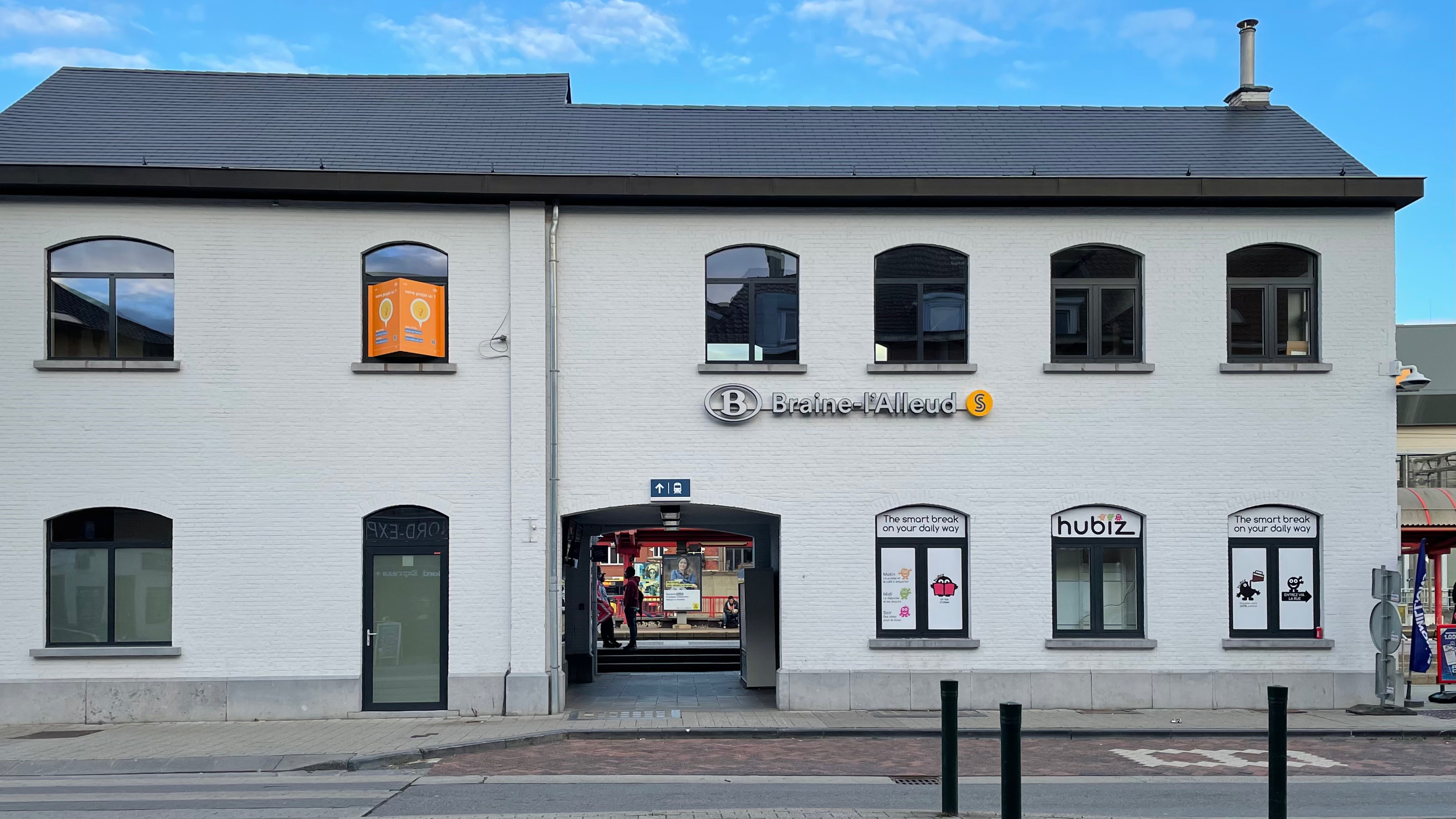
Frontal view

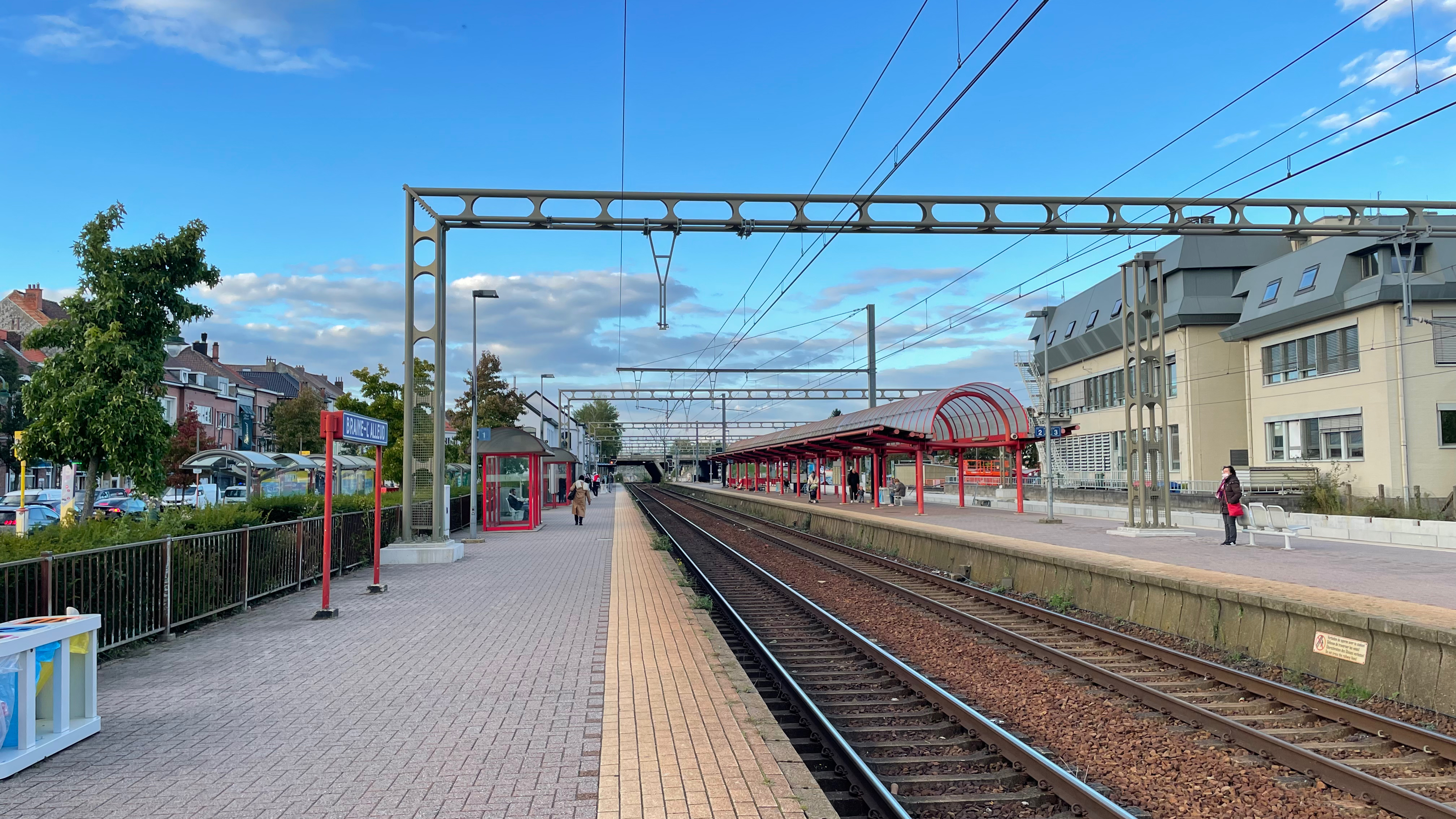
View of the platforms and tracks

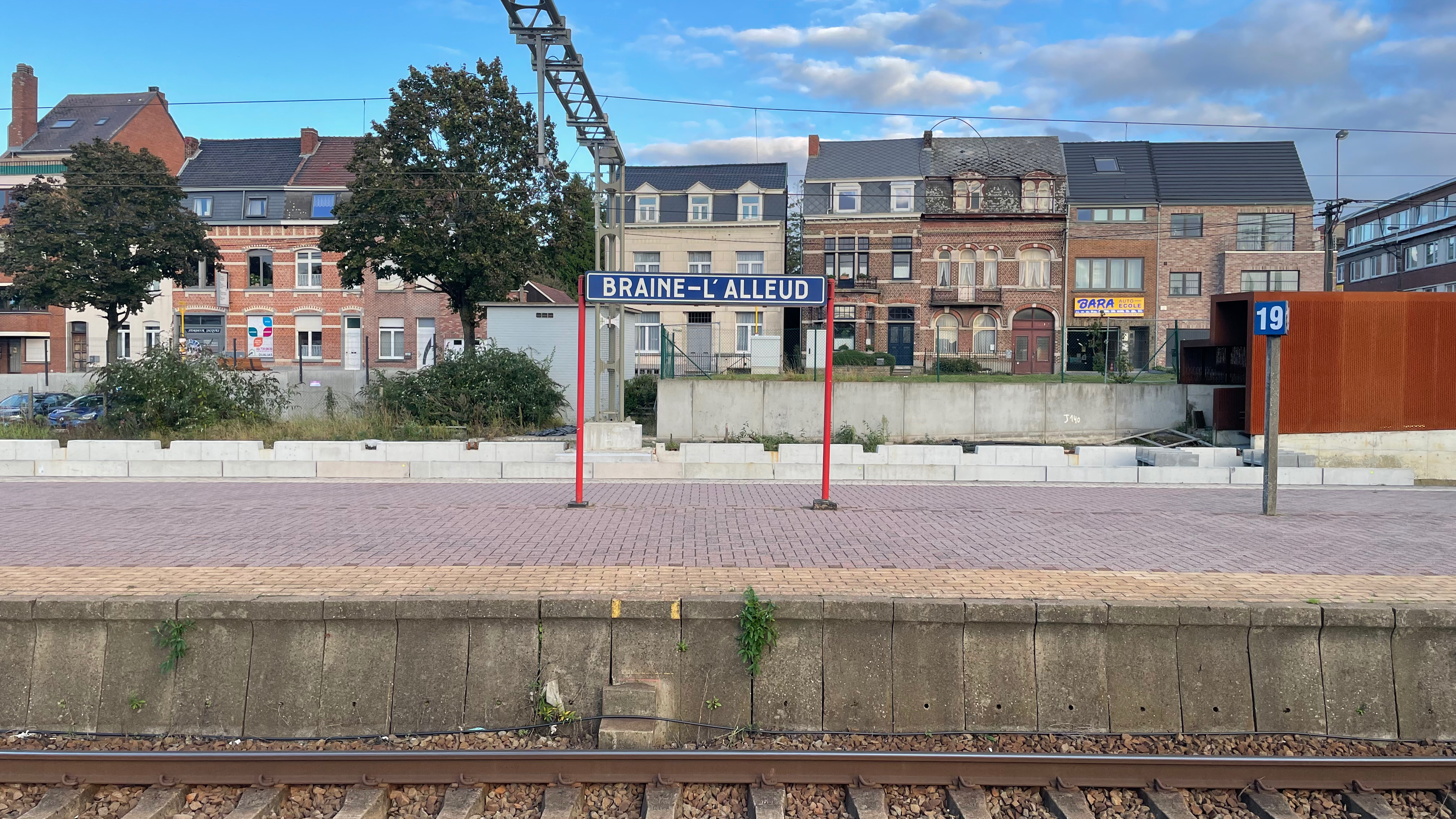
Place name sign on a platform

== See also ==
- List of railway stations in Belgium
- Rail transport in Belgium
