= Gare, Zavidovići =

Village in Bosnia and Herzegovina

Gare
- Village
- Location within Bosnia and Herzegovina
- Coordinates: 44.3986°N 18.3440°E
- Country: Bosnia and Herzegovina
- Entity: Federation of Bosnia and Herzegovina
- Canton: Zenica-Doboj
- Municipality: Zavidovići

Area
  - Total: 6.68 sq mi (17.29 km^{2})

Population (2013)
  - Total: 108
  - Density: 16.2/sq mi (6.25/km^{2})
- Time zone: UTC+1 (CET)
  - Summer (DST): UTC+2 (CEST)

Gare is a village in the municipality of Zavidovići, Bosnia and Herzegovina.

== Demographics ==
According to the 2013 census, its population was 108.

Ethnicity in 2013
Ethnicity	Number	Percentage
Bosniaks	78	72.2%
Serbs	28	25.9%
other/undeclared	2	1.9%
Total	108	100%
