= Gare Centrale =

Gare Centrale (French for Central Station) may refer to:

- Gare Centrale (Brussels)
- Gare Centrale (Charleroi)
- Gare Centrale (Montreal)
- Gare Centrale (Mulhouse)
- Strasbourg-Ville station, also referred to as gare centrale
