= Louis Samain =

Belgian sculptor (1834–1901)

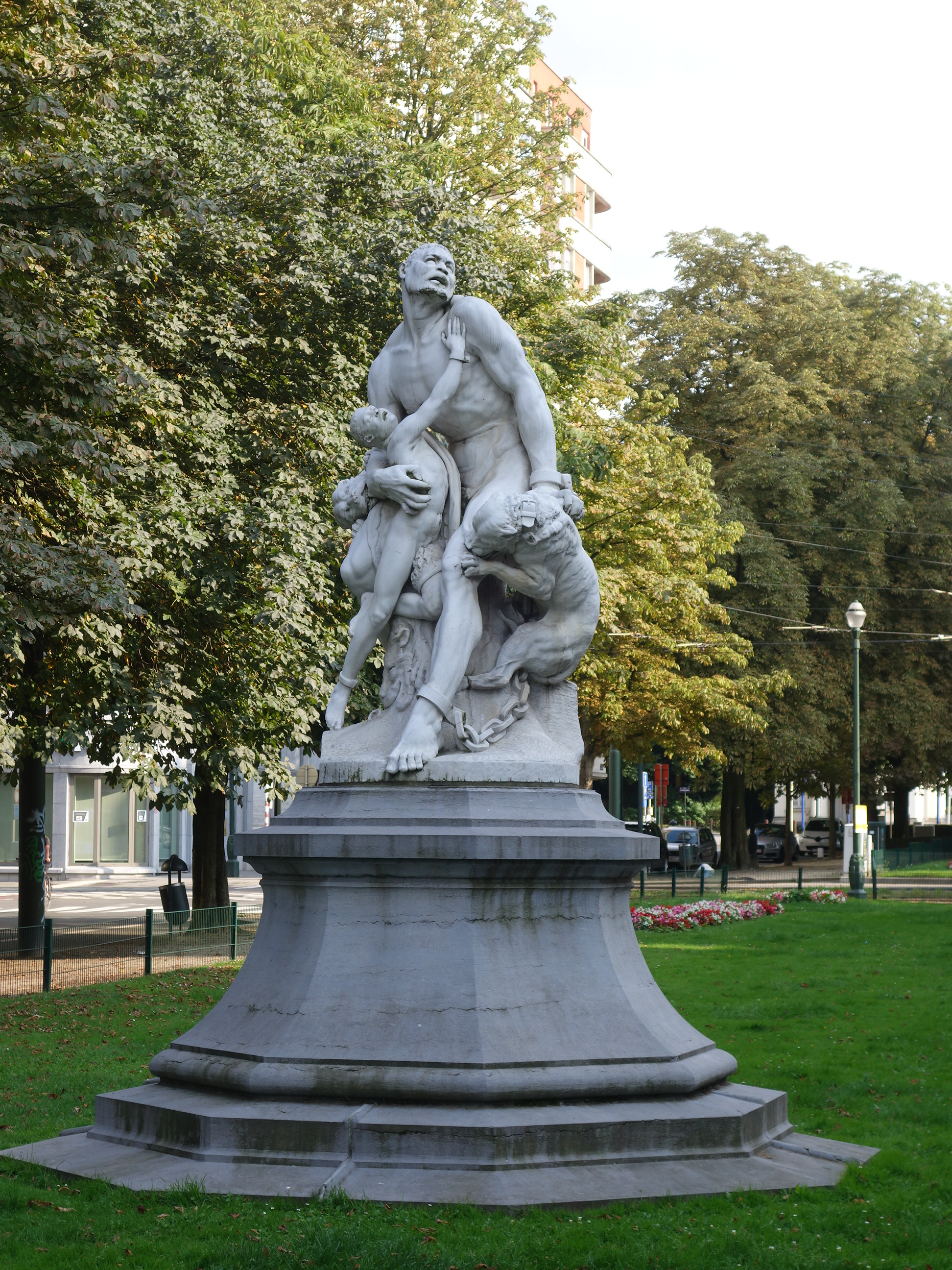
Nègres marrons surpris par des chiens (1893), a sculpture in Brussels by Louis Samain, inspired by a scene in Harriet Beecher Stowe's 1852 novel Uncle Tom's Cabin

Louis Samain (July 4, 1834 – October 24, 1901) was a Belgian sculptor. Samain was born in Nivelles, and studied at the Académie Royale des Beaux-Arts in Brussels under Louis Simonis. After winning the Belgian Prix de Rome, he lived for a time in Italy. In 1889, he was awarded a gold medal at the Paris Exposition Universelle, and in 1895 his work was shown at the Société des Artistes Français in Paris. He died in Ixelles.

== Selected works ==
- Architecture, on the facade of the Royal Museums of Fine Arts of Belgium
- Earth and Water, at les Halles centrales (destroyed in 1956)
- Italian Arts and Spanish Arts, in the garden of the Musée des Beaux-Arts
- Jean van Ruysbroeck
- Monument to Work, formerly on the old Gare de Bruxelles-Midi
- Nègres marrons surpris par des chiens (also known as Esclave repris par les chiens)
- Thémis, on the Palais de Justice in Dinant
- Tinctoris in Nivelles
