= Belgian railway line 124 =

Railway line between Brussels and Charleroi, Belgium

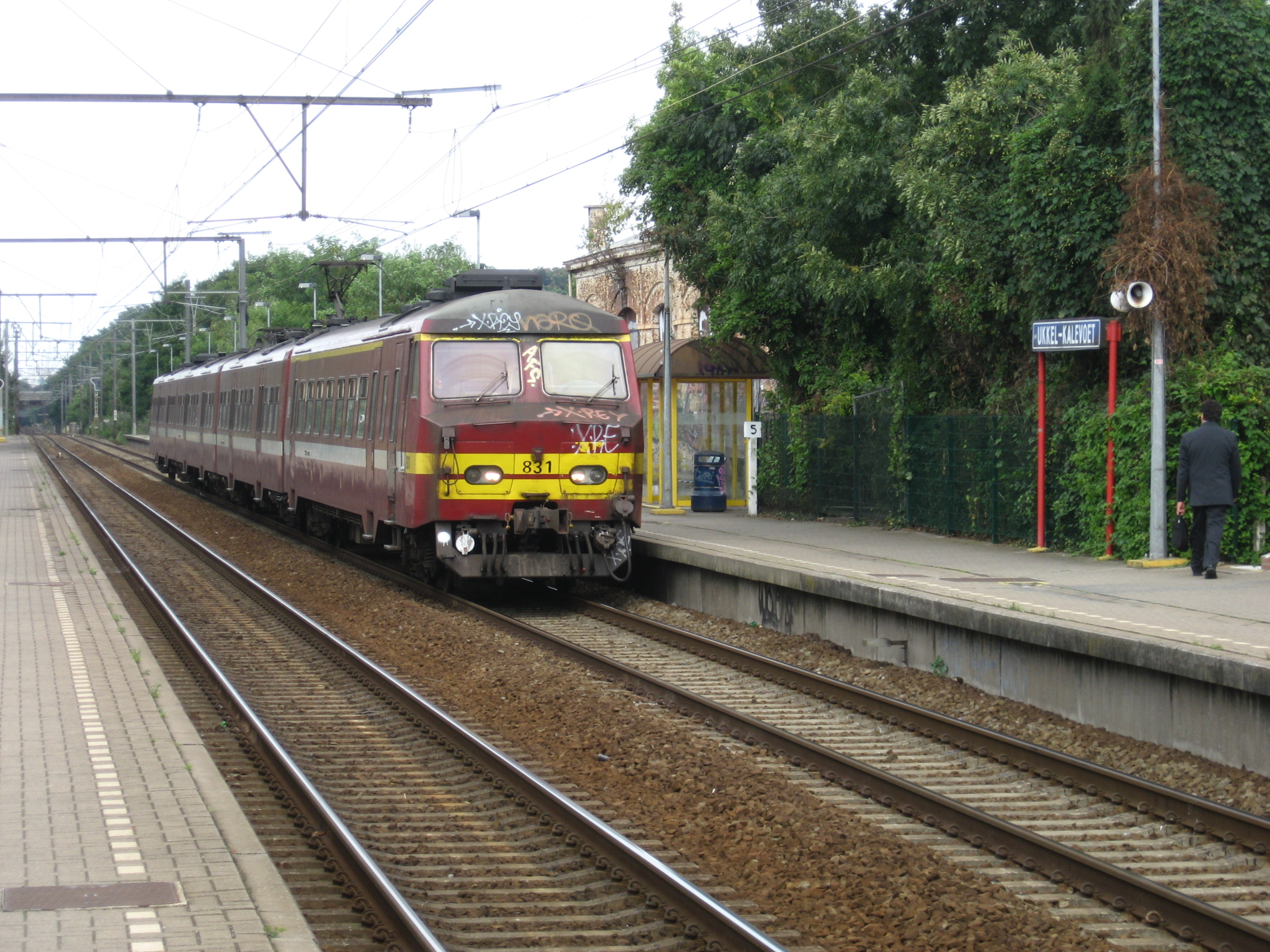
- A local passenger train at Uccle-Calevoet station in 2008

Overview
- Status: Operational
- Locale: Belgium
- Termini: Brussels-South railway station; Charleroi-South railway station

Service
Services
- Operator(s): National Railway Company of Belgium

History
- Opened: 1843-1874

Technical
- Line length: 56 km (35 mi)
- Number of tracks: double track
- Track gauge: 1,435 mm (4 ft 8 1/2 in) standard gauge
- Electrification: 3 kV DC
Route map
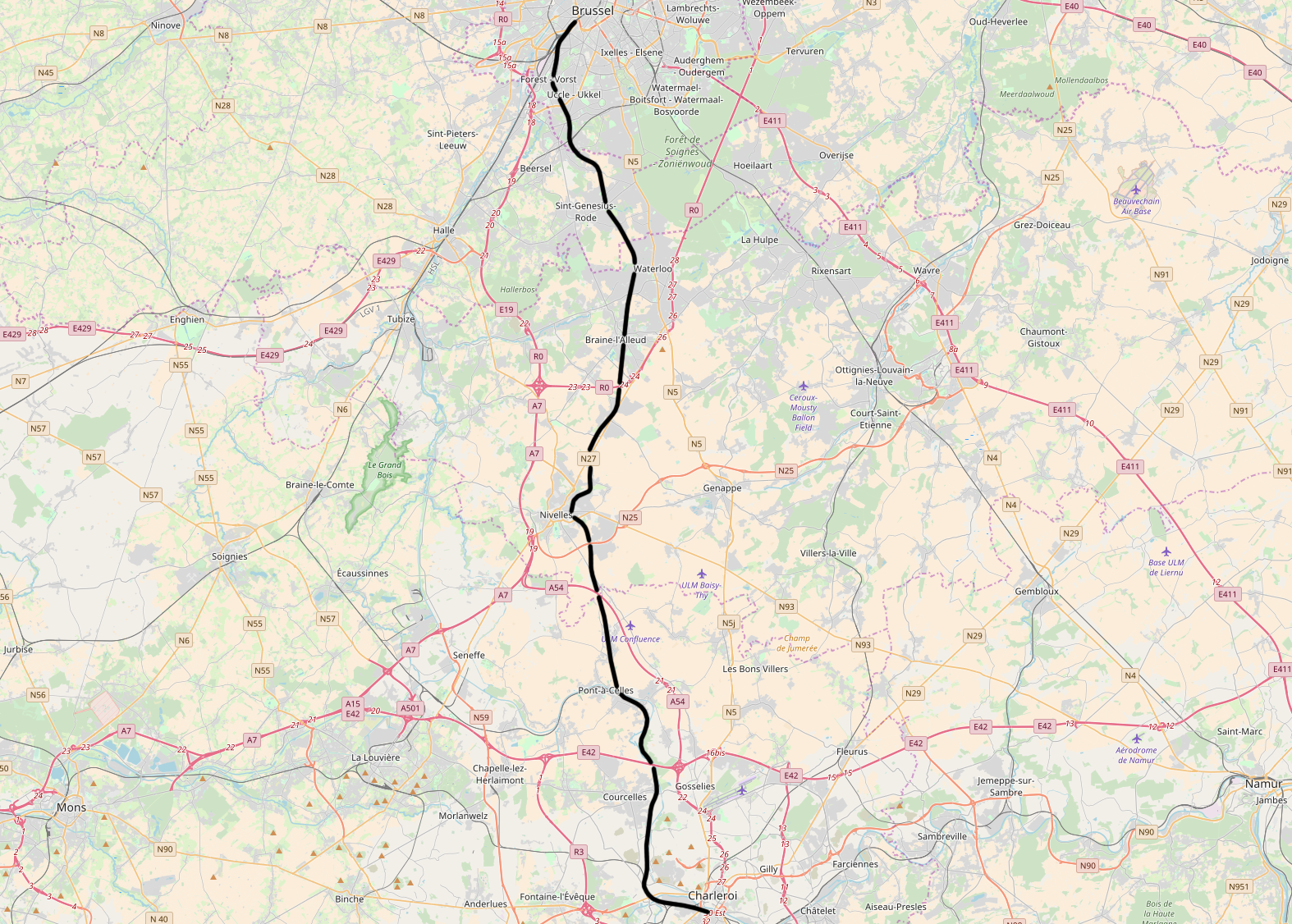

The Belgian railway line 124 is a railway line in Belgium connecting Brussels to Charleroi. The first section, between Luttre and Charleroi, was built in 1843. The complete line, which runs 55.9 km, was opened on 1 June 1874.

The line passes through the following stations:

- Brussels-South
- Forest-East
- Uccle-Stalle
- Uccle-Calevoet
- Linkebeek
- Holleken
- Sint-Genesius-Rode
- De Hoek
- Waterloo
- Braine-l'Alleud
- Lillois
- Nivelles
- Obaix-Buzet
- Luttre
- Courcelles-Motte
- Roux
- Marchienne-au-Pont
- Charleroi-South
