= Nivelles railway station =

Railway station in Walloon Brabant, Belgium

Nivelles
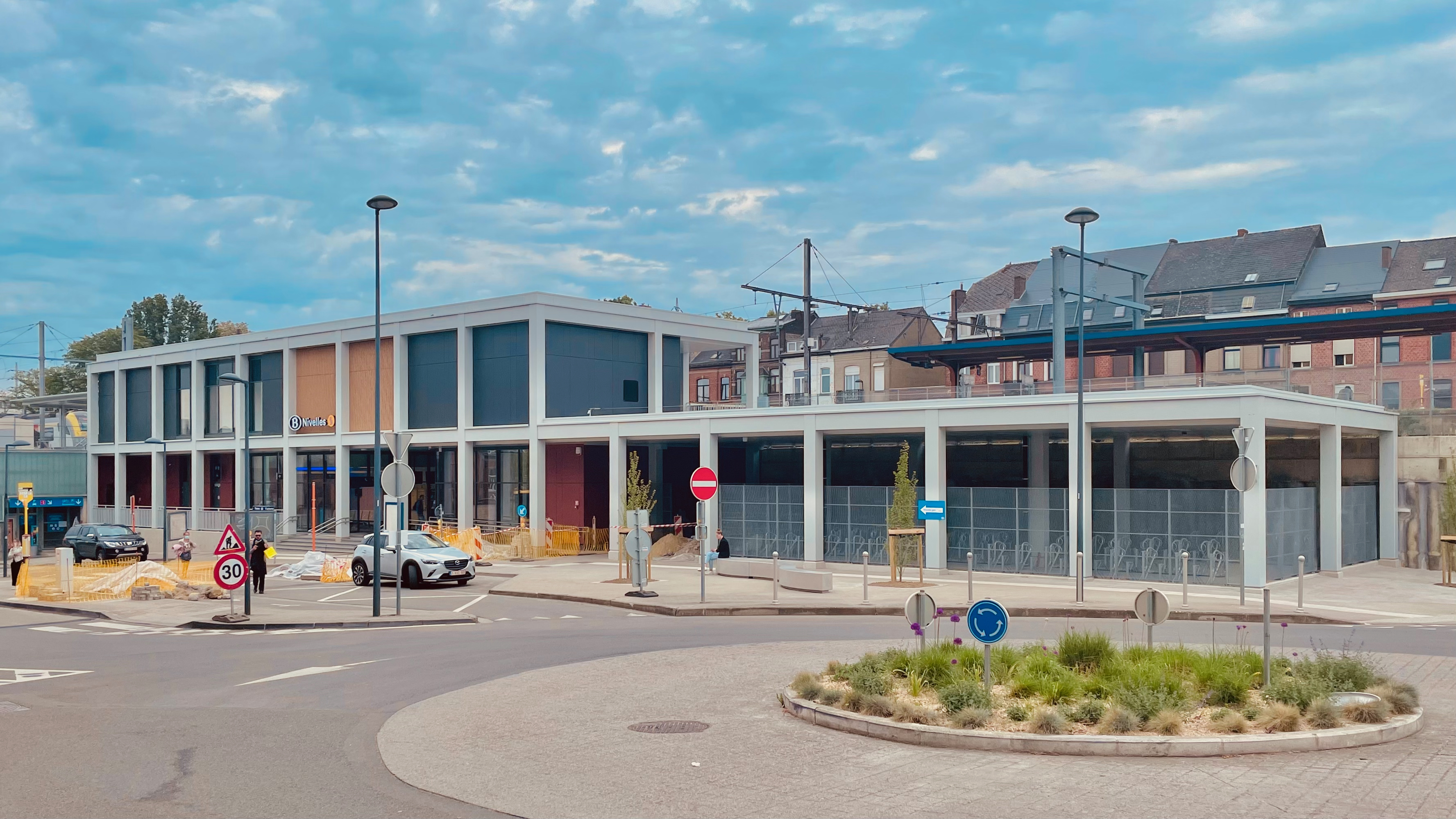
- Nivelles railway station

General information
- Location: Nivelles, Walloon Brabant; Belgium
- Coordinates: 50°36′04″N 4°20′07″E
- System: Railway Station
- Owner: SNCB/NMBS
- Operator: SNCB/NMBS
- Line: 124
- Platforms: 4
- Tracks: 4

Other information
- Station code: FNVT
- Website: Official website

History
- Opened: 1 June 1874; 152 years ago

Passengers
- 2014: 4,184 per day
Location
- Location within Belgium Location within Europe

Nivelles railway station (French: Gare de Nivelles; Dutch: Station Nijvel) (Note: Officially Nivelles (French: Nivelles; Dutch: Nijvel)) is a railway station in Nivelles, Walloon Brabant, Belgium. The station opened on 1 June 1874 and is located on railway line 124. The train services are operated by the National Railway Company of Belgium (SNCB/NMBS).

The station used to be known as Nivelles-East railway station (French: Gare de Nivelles-Est; Dutch: Station Nijvel-Oost) (Note: Officially Nivelles-Est (French: Nivelles-Est; Dutch: Nijvel-Oost)) when there was also a Nivelles-North railway station on the former line 141. The railway line between Nivelles–Waterloo–Linkebeek (south of Brussels) is currently (2015) being enlarged to allow a higher frequency of local and intercity trains.

== Train services ==
The station is served by the following services:

- Intercity services (IC-05) Antwerp - Mechelen - Brussels - Nivelles - Charleroi (weekdays)
- Intercity services (IC-27) Brussels Airport - Brussels-Luxembourg - Etterbeek - Nivelles - Charleroi (weekdays)
- Intercity services (IC-31) Antwerp - Mechelen - Brussels - Nivelles - Charleroi (weekends)
- Brussels RER services (S1) Antwerp - Mechelen - Brussels - Waterloo - Nivelles (weekdays)
- Brussels RER services (S1) Brussels - Waterloo - Nivelles (weekends)
- Brussels RER services (S9) Landen - Brussels-Luxembourg - Nivelles (weekdays)

Preceding station	NMBS/SNCB	Following station
Braine-l'Alleud towards Antwerpen-Centraal	IC 05 weekdays	Luttre towards Charleroi-Sud
Lillois towards Brussels National Airport	IC 27 weekdays	Obaix-Buzet towards Charleroi-Sud
Braine-l'Alleud towards Antwerpen-Centraal	IC 31 weekends	Luttre towards Charleroi-Sud
Lillois towards Antwerpen-Centraal	S 1 weekdays	Terminus
Lillois towards Bruxelles-Nord / Brussel-Noord	S 1 weekends	Terminus
Lillois towards Braine-l'Alleud	S 9 weekdays	Terminus

== See also ==
- List of railway stations in Belgium
- Rail transport in Belgium
