= Halle railway station, Belgium =

Railway station in Flemish Brabant, Belgium

Halle
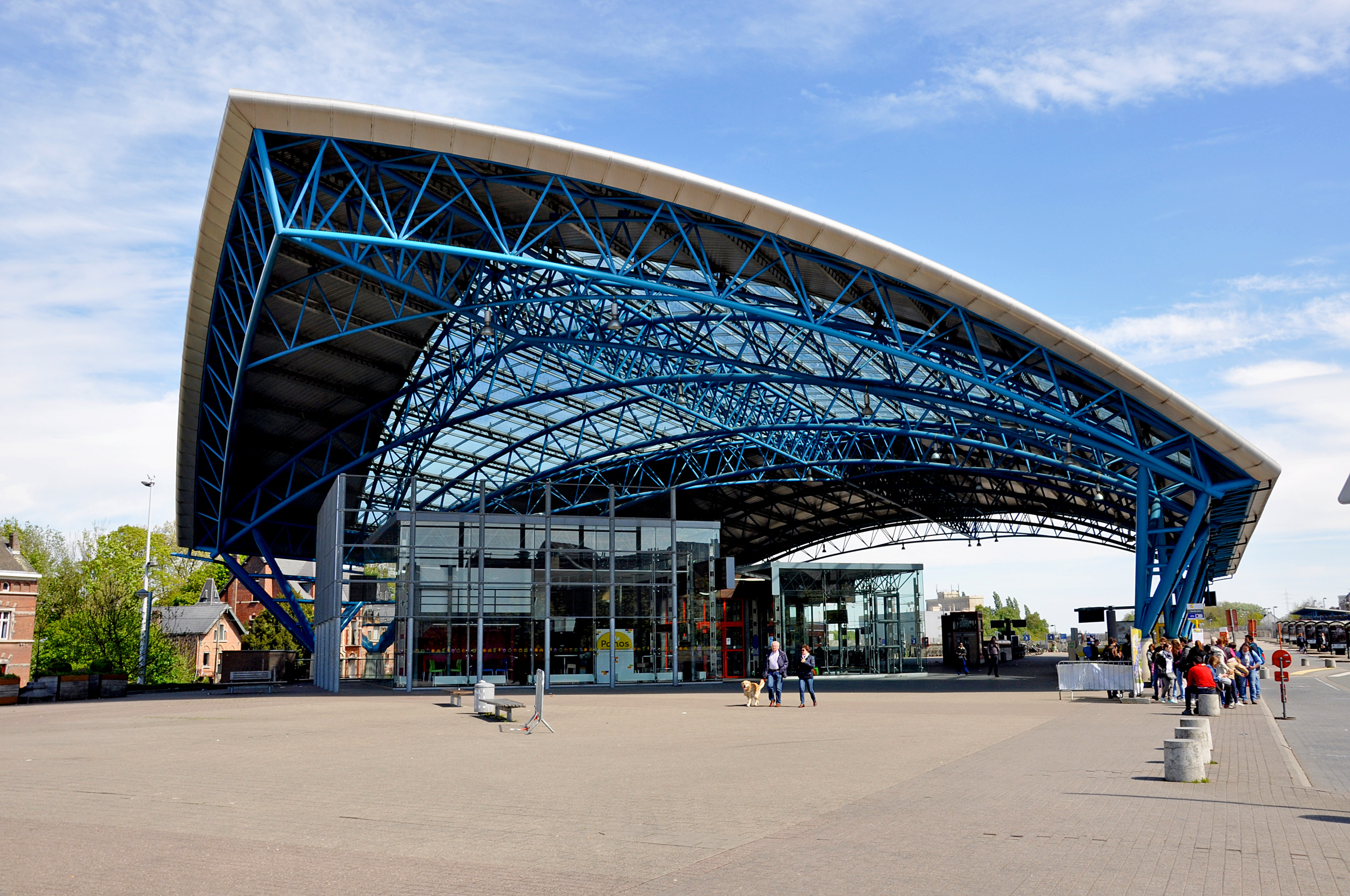
- Halle railway station

General information
- Location: Halle, Flemish Brabant; Belgium
- Coordinates: 50°44′01″N 4°14′25″E
- System: Railway Station
- Owner: NMBS/SNCB
- Operator: NMBS/SNCB
- Lines: HSL 1, 26, 94, 96, 96E, 96N
- Platforms: 5
- Tracks: 7

Other information
- Station code: FH

History
- Opened: 18 May 1840; 186 years ago

Passengers
- 2009: 5,057 per day
Location
- Location within Belgium Location within Europe

Halle railway station (Dutch: Station Halle; French: Gare de Hal) (Note: Officially Halle (Dutch: Halle; French: Hal)) is a railway station in Halle, Flemish Brabant, Belgium. The station opened on 18 May 1840 and is located on the HSL 1, as well as railway lines 26, 94, and 96. The train services are operated by the National Railway Company of Belgium (NMBS/SNCB).

On 15 February 2010, the Halle train collision occurred between Halle and Buizingen stations, killing 19 and injuring 171.

== Train services ==
The station is served by the following services:

- Intercity services (IC-06) Tournai - Ath - Halle - Brussels - Brussels Airport
- Intercity services (IC-11) Binche - Braine-le-Comte - Halle - Brussels - Mechelen - Turnhout (weekdays)
- Intercity services (IC-11) Binche - Braine-le-Comte - Halle - Brussels - Schaarbeek (weekends)
- Intercity services (IC-14) Quiévrain - Mons - Braine-le-Comte - Halle - Brussels - Leuven - Liege (weekdays)
- Intercity services (IC-26) Kortrijk - Tournai - Halle - Brussels - Dendermonde - Lokeren - Sint Niklaas (weekdays)
- Brussels RER services (S2) Braine-le-Comte - Halle - Brussels - Leuven
- Brussels RER services (S5) (Geraardsbergen -) Enghien - Halle - Etterbeek - Brussels-Luxembourg - Mechelen (weekdays)
- Brussels RER services (S5) Halle - Etterbeek - Brussels-Schuman - Mechelen (weekends)
- Brussels RER services (S6) Aalst - Denderleeuw - Geraardsbergen - Halle - Brussels - Schaarbeek (weekdays)
- Brussels RER services (S6) Denderleeuw - Geraardsbergen - Halle - Brussels - Schaarbeek (weekends)
- Brussels RER services (S7) Halle - Merode - Vilvoorde (weekdays)

Preceding station	NMBS/SNCB	Following station
Enghien towards Tournai	IC 06	Bruxelles-Midi / Brussel-Zuid towards Brussels National Airport
Tubize towards Binche	IC 11 weekdays	Bruxelles-Midi / Brussel-Zuid towards Turnhout
Braine-le-Comte towards Quiévrain	IC 14 weekdays	Bruxelles-Midi / Brussel-Zuid towards Liège-Guillemins
Tubize towards Binche	IC 22 weekends	Bruxelles-Midi / Brussel-Zuid towards Antwerpen-Centraal
Enghien towards Kortrijk	IC 26 weekdays	Bruxelles-Midi / Brussel-Zuid towards Sint-Niklaas
Lembeek towards Braine-le-Comte	S 2	Buizingen towards Leuven
Enghien Terminus	S 5 weekdays	Huizingen towards Mechelen
Enghien towards Aalst	S 6	Bruxelles-Midi / Brussel-Zuid towards Schaarbeek
Terminus	S 7 weekdays	Huizingen towards Vilvoorde

== Gallery ==
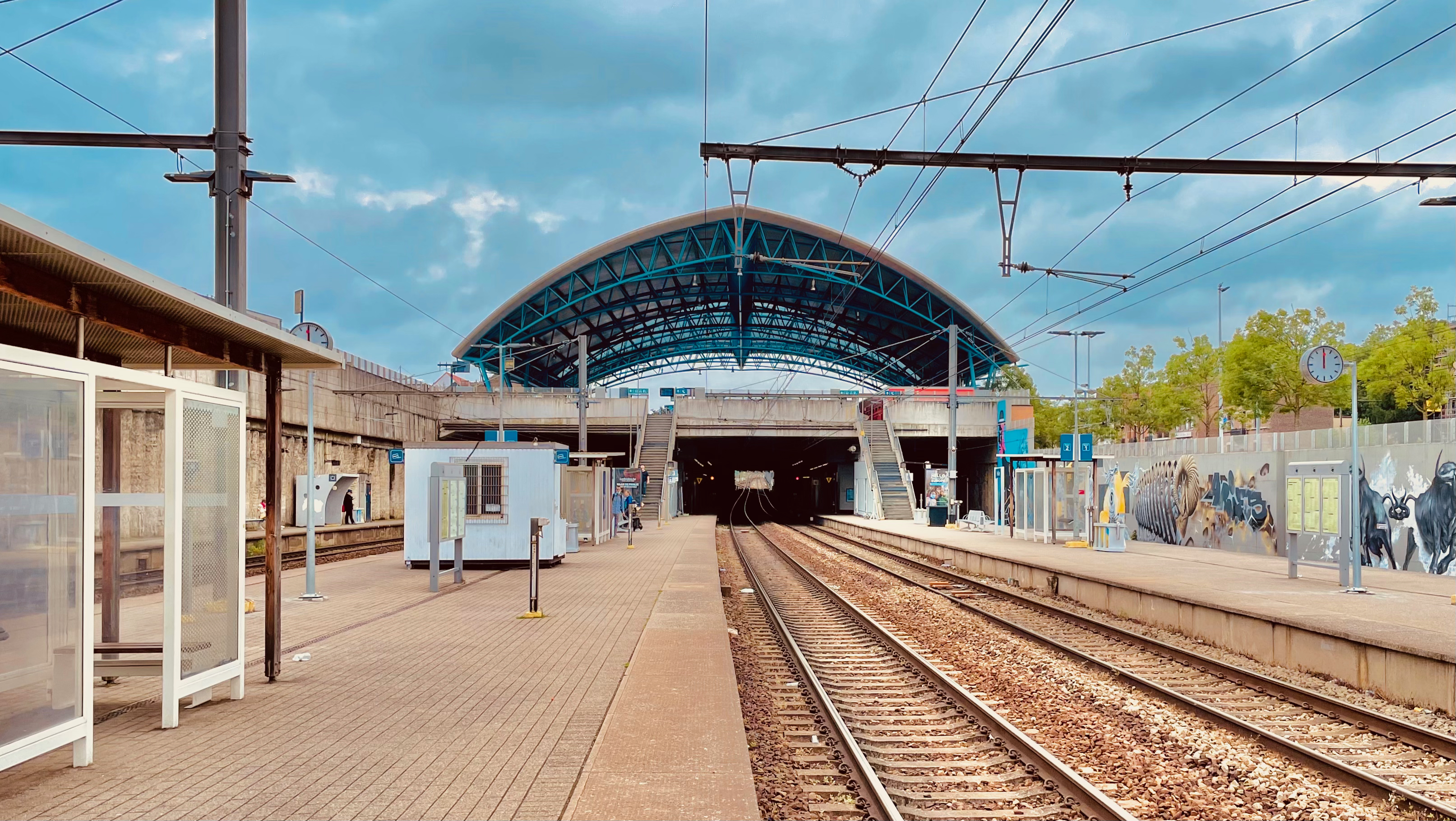
View of the platforms and tracks

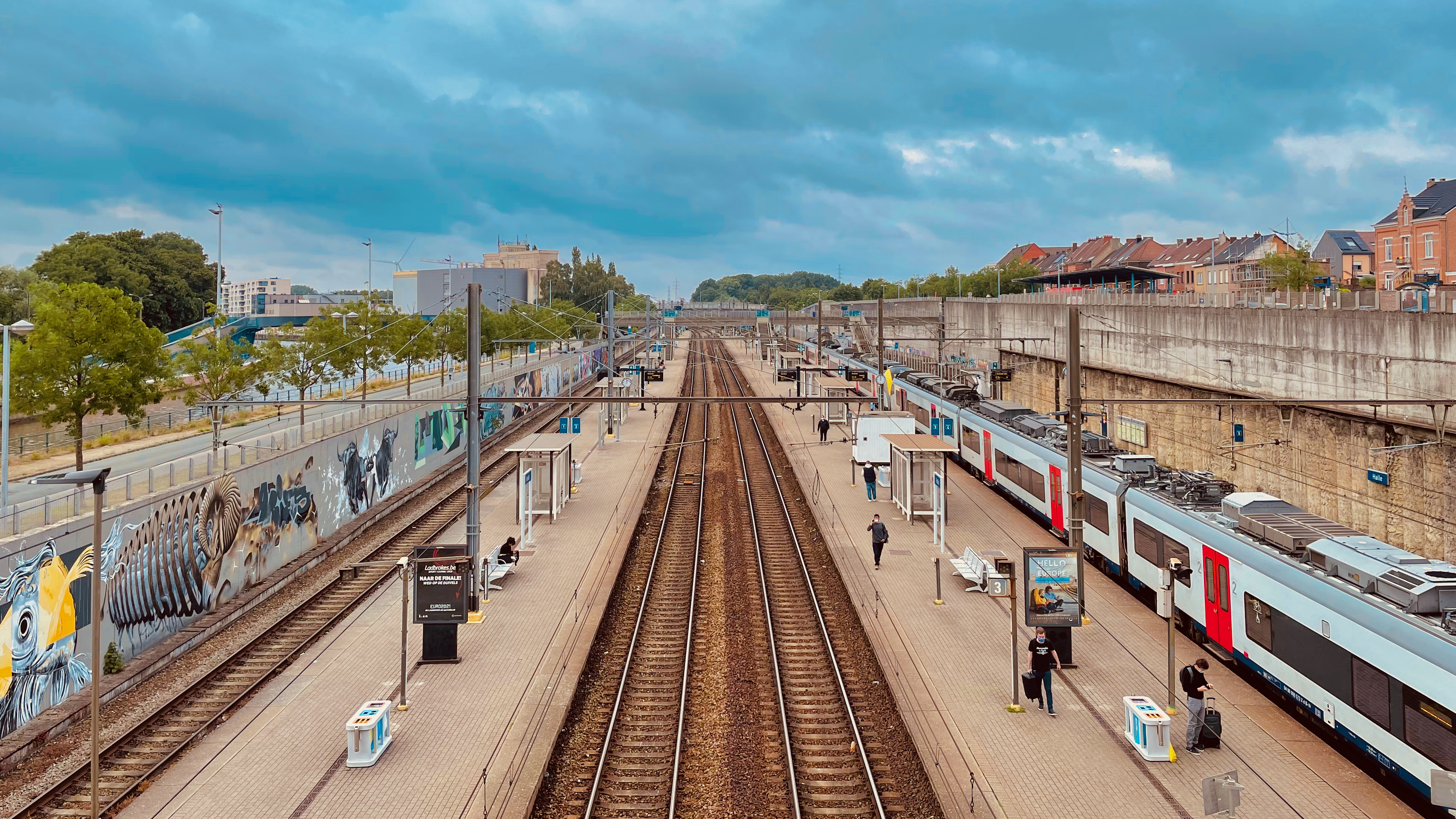
Looking down at the platforms and tracks

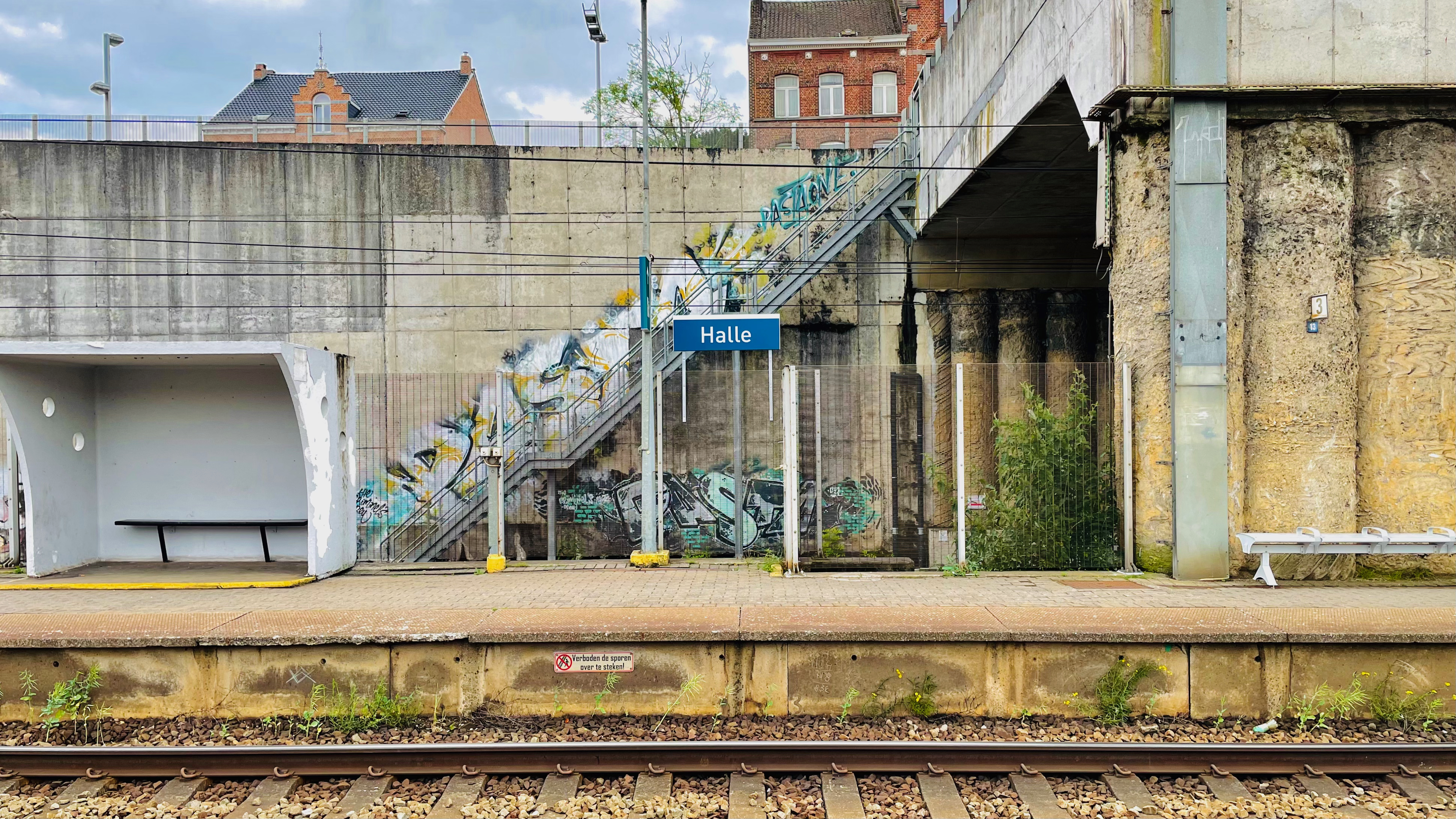
Place name sign on a platform

== See also ==
- List of railway stations in Belgium
- Rail transport in Belgium
