= Halle train collision =

2010 Belgian train wreck

- Location within Belgium

Details
- Date: 15 February 2010; 08:28 CET (07:28 UTC)
- Location: Buizingen, Halle
- Coordinates: 50°44′42″N 4°15′6″E
- Country: Belgium
- Line: Line 96 (Brussels–Quévy)
- Operator: NMBS/SNCB
- Incident type: Collision
- Cause: Running of a red signal

Statistics
- Trains: 2 passenger trains
- Passengers: 250–300 passengers
- Deaths: 19
- Injured: 171 (35 serious)
- Damage: Extensive damage to rails and overhead wiring Extensive damage to first three rail carriages of both trains

The Halle train collision (also known as the Buizingen train collision) was a collision between two NMBS/SNCB passenger trains carrying a combined 250 to 300 people in Buizingen, in the municipality of Halle, Flemish Brabant, Belgium, on 15 February 2010. The crash occurred in snowy conditions at 08:28 CET (07:28 UTC), during rush hour, on railway line 96 (Brussels–Quévy) about 12 kilometres (7.5 mi) from Brussels between P-train E3678 from Leuven to Braine-le-Comte (a local rush hour train) and IC-train E1707 from Quiévrain to Liège (an intercity train). A third train was able to come to a stop just in time. The collision killed 19 people and injured 171, making it the deadliest rail crash in Belgium in over fifty years.

Three investigations were held in the aftermath of the crash: a parliamentary investigation to review railway safety, a safety investigation for the purpose of preventing future crashes, and a judicial investigation into whether any laws were broken. The cause of the crash was determined to be a human error by the driver of the train from Leuven, who passed a red signal without authorization. This was contested by the train driver, despite the confirmations of the safety and judicial investigations. Another contributing factor was the absence of TBL 1+ on the train that passed the red signal. If TBL 1+ had been installed the crash may have been avoided. Because of multiple difficulties the judicial investigation lasted for years, causing the train driver, the NMBS/SNCB, and Infrabel (the infrastructure operator) to be summoned to court only in June 2018.

The disaster led to the accelerated rollout of TBL 1+ on the entire Belgian railway network. The last NMBS/SNCB train was fitted with the system in November 2016.

== Collision ==
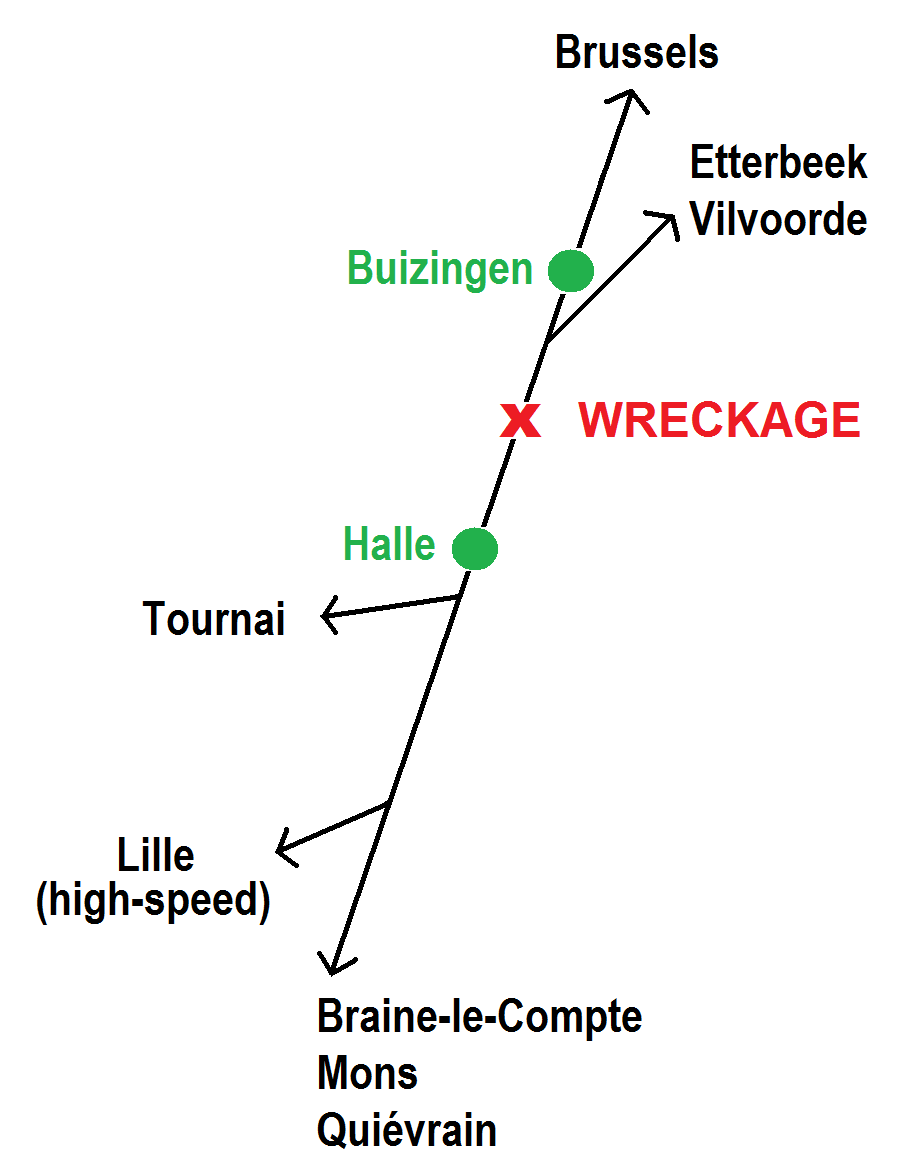
A schematic diagram of the railway lines which converge in Halle, indicating the position of the wreckage blocking the southwestern railway access to Brussels.

The train from Leuven, an AM70 Class Classical EMU, was running south on schedule to Braine-le-Comte in the normal (left-handed) direction on its track. It passed a double yellow signal at 08:16 about 500 m (550 yd) ahead of Buizingen station (the next stop). A double yellow means the train must slow down to be able to stop should the next signal be red. The driver must manually confirm the double yellow signal otherwise the train brakes automatically. The next signal was a few hundred meters beyond Buizingen station. At 08:26 the train stopped in Buizingen, and at 08:27 it left the station for its next stop, Halle. The train passed the signal beyond Buizingen station at a speed of 60 km/h (37 mph) whilst accelerating. It was established later that the signal had been red and the train should not have passed it.

The train from Quiévrain, an AM54 Class Classical EMU, was running north in the normal direction on its track, ten minutes behind schedule. After Halle station it passed a yellow-green vertical signal and slowed to 80 km/h (50 mph). A yellow-green vertical signal means the next signal will be double yellow, but there won't be enough distance between the double yellow and the (potentially red) signal after it to come to a full stop. The train therefore needs to start braking before encountering the double yellow. The train had slowed to 40 km/h (25 mph) when it passed the double yellow. At 08:26 the signaller in the Brussels-South signal control center directed the train from line 96 to line 96N, causing it to cross the path of the train from Leuven and automatically change the signal in front of the first switch to green. The train accelerated past the green signal at 08:27 at about 70 km/h (45 mph).

Seeing the Quiévrain train crossing his path, the driver of the Leuven train applied the horn and emergency brakes but could not avoid the collision. He leapt from the cab moments before impact and was found sobbing at the side of the tracks with serious injuries. The train from Leuven hit the side of the train from Quiévrain at 08:28. The first three carriages of both trains were severely damaged, being crushed or flipped on their sides. The second carriage of the Leuven train was forced upwards into the air over the third carriage. Eyewitnesses described the collision as brutal with passengers being thrown violently around the carriages, and referring to dead bodies lying next to the tracks.

The driver of a third train, train E1557 from Geraardsbergen to Brussels-South coming from Halle and running parallel to the other trains, saw the crash happen and applied emergency braking. The train came to a full stop at 08:29, just short of hitting the wreckage and without injury to any of its passengers.

== Emergency response ==
The driver of the third (non-involved) train immediately reported the crash to Infrabel Traffic Control, who alerted the provincial emergency control center of Flemish Brabant and activated emergency procedures halting all train traffic in the area. At 08:32 the emergency control center initiated its medical intervention plan for a mass-casualty incident. The first emergency crews arrived within minutes from the nearby Halle fire station. Police, fire, and emergency medical services were involved in the rescue operations alongside the Red Cross and Civil Protection. The provincial governor Lodewijk De Witte was informed of the crash at 08:39 and the provincial phase of emergency management was initiated at 09:15.

As the carriages and ground were littered with loose overhead wires, the first responders and a train conductor initially had passengers remain in the carriages. Once the power was confirmed to be switched off the walking wounded followed the tracks to the nearby sports center in Buizingen. The more seriously injured were brought to a fire service tent until a field medical post was set up in front of Halle train station. Here victims were triaged and distributed to fourteen hospitals including in Brussels. Uninjured victims were gathered in a sports center in Halle where a reception center was established for friends and family and an information telephone number set up. The Red Cross ensured the availability of normal emergency services in areas from which ambulances had been dispatched.

== Casualties ==
Initial reports quoted a death toll ranging from 8 to 25. At a press conference in the afternoon a provisional death toll of 18 people (15 men and 3 women) was given based on bodies recovered, and 162 injured. Rescuers early on discounted the possibility of finding survivors still trapped in the trains, and the search for bodies was interrupted at nightfall to resume the next morning. Recovered bodies were identified by the Belgian federal police's Disaster Victim Identification team and transported to the morgue at Neder-Over-Heembeek military hospital where support was provided for relatives of the dead.

The final death toll was determined to be 19 including the driver of the Quiévrain train, and 171 injured. Emergency services transported 55 injured from the field medical post to hospital by ambulance and 89 injured presented themselves at hospital by their own means. The investigation eventually classified 35 victims as "seriously injured", 44 "moderately injured", and 92 having sustained minor bruising.

== Damage and service disruption ==
=== Train services disrupted ===
Immediately after the crash, all rail traffic was suspended on lines 96 (Brussels–Quévy), 94 (Halle–Tournai), 26 (Halle–Schaarbeek) and HSL 1. Consequential disruptions were expected throughout much of Wallonia (southern Belgium) and in a more limited fashion also in Flanders (northern Belgium). It took two to three days to recover human remains and perform necessary investigative acts, and a few additional days to repair the damage to adjacent tracks so those could be taken into service again. During those days, alternative bus services were provided between Halle station and Brussels-South station. After the damage to the adjacent tracks and overhead wiring was repaired, limited service could resume on those tracks.

Because line 96 is also used by international high-speed trains leaving from Brussels for France and the United Kingdom until they can enter HSL 1 in Halle, international traffic was suspended as well and remained suspended through Tuesday 16 February. Thalys, a high-speed operator built around the line between Paris and Brussels, had to divert four of its high-speed trains in the area at the time to alternative stations. It cancelled all of its services, including trains to Amsterdam and Cologne. A limited Thalys service between Brussels and Paris resumed on the evening of 16 February, with trains leaving from Brussels passing on the single usable track at Buizingen, while trains from Paris were diverted via Ghent. Thalys services between Brussels and Cologne resumed on 17 February. Other TGV services from France to Brussels terminated at Lille-Flandres, just before the Belgian border and the last station before Brussels-South that can accommodate high-speed trains in normal service.

Eurostar, which operates services through the Channel Tunnel to the United Kingdom, cancelled all its services to and from Brussels but continued to operate its services between London and Paris and between London and Lille, the latter with delays. A skeleton service of three Eurostar trains a day in each direction between London and Brussels resumed on 22 February. The trains were diverted via Ghent, lengthening travel time. The full timetabled service resumed on Monday 1 March, two weeks after the crash.

According to data from Infrabel, the crash caused 1,109 trains to be completely cancelled between 16 February and 2 March and 2,615 trains to be partially cancelled between 16 February and 11 March. The crash was also responsible for a total of 41,257 minutes (± 688 hours) of delays between 16 February and 19 March. All service disruptions were ultimately resolved on 19 March.

=== Spontaneous strike ===
Further disruption was also caused on 16 February when train personnel staged an unofficial strike in protest of what they called "deteriorating working conditions", which they said could lead to crashes such as the one in Buizingen. The largest impact was in Wallonia, and international train traffic was also affected.

=== Damage to the infrastructure ===
The crash caused major damage to the overhead contact system and the tracks on railway lines 96 and 96N. Railway line 26, a major freight and commuter line, was also damaged due to scattered debris. After the recovery of human remains and the necessary investigative acts on the scene, which took two to three days, the (relatively) undamaged carriages were hauled away between Tuesday 16 and Wednesday 17 February. The removal of the wrecked train carriages started on Thursday 18 February. The carriages were completely removed on 26 February, after which Infrabel could start repairing the tracks and overhead wiring. On Monday 1 March, two weeks after the crash, the tracks and overhead wiring were repaired by Infrabel and all suspended train traffic could resume on the affected lines. However, a speed limitation of 40 km/h (25 mph) remained in place until the end of the week because the new tracks had yet to be stabilised. Infrabel warned the speed restriction could result in delays of 5 to 10 minutes during rush hour.

== Condolences and reactions ==
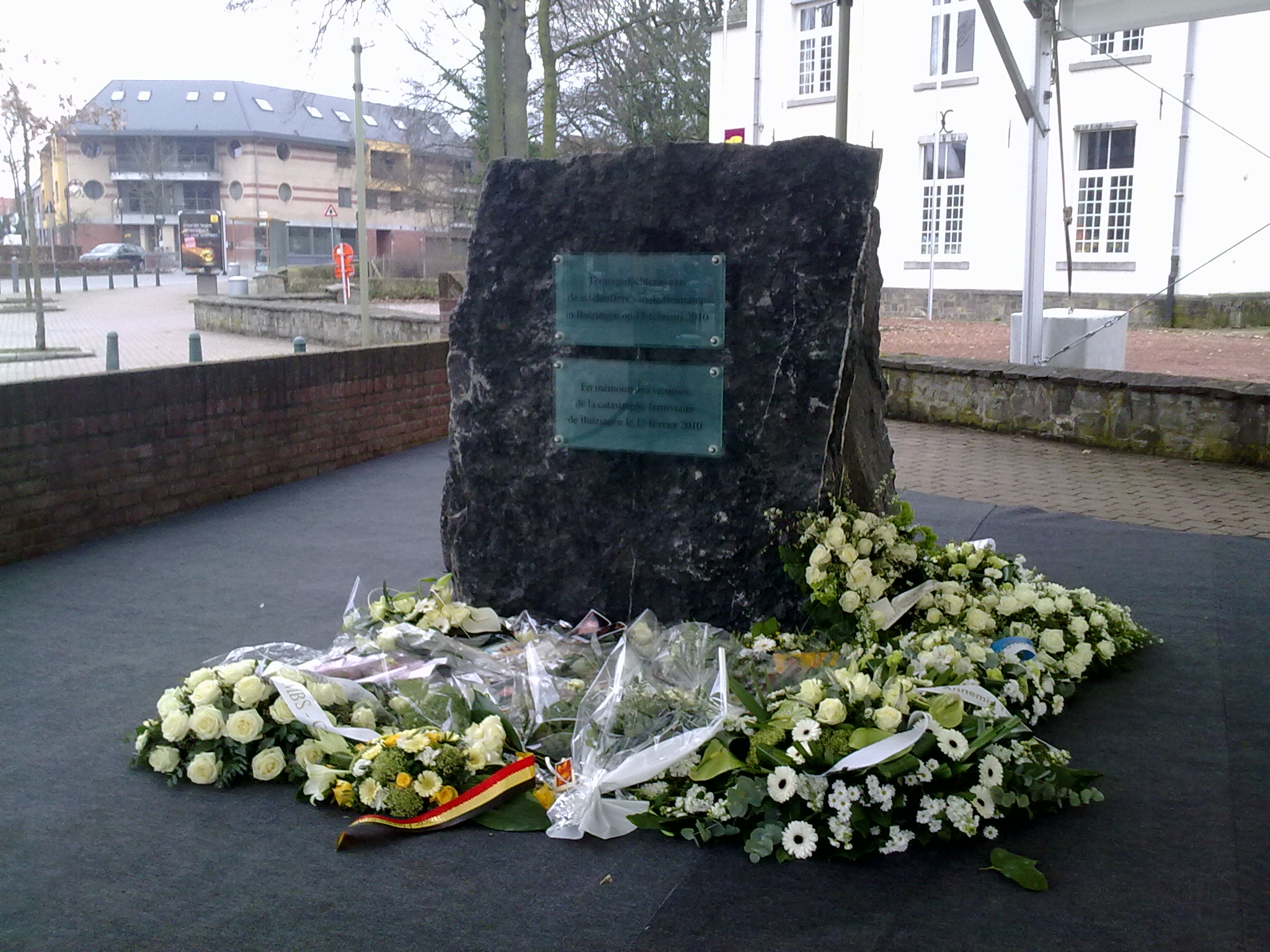
Memorial to the 19 killed victims.

=== Domestic ===
Both King Albert II and Prime Minister Yves Leterme returned from their foreign stay to Belgium and visited the crash site the same day of the crash. Leterme expressed his condolences to the victims and their families, and stated that "there was a sense of defeat. First Liège, and now this" in reference to the 27 January 2010 gas explosion in Liège that killed 14 people. The king and prime minister were accompanied by a large delegation of ministers of the federal government and the regional governments, the CEOs of the Belgian rail companies (NMBS/SNCB and Infrabel), Brussels Royal Prosecutor Bruno Bulthé, the general commissioner of the federal police Fernand Koekelberg and governor Lodewijk De Witte. Walloon minister-president Rudy Demotte called the crash a "not just a Walloon or Flemish drama, but a national drama". Flemish minister-president Kris Peeters was on an economic mission in San Francisco and thus could not be there, but he expressed his condolences in the name of the Flemish Government, and thanked the emergency services for their quick intervention. Federal minister of Public Enterprises (responsible for the NMBS/SNCB) Inge Vervotte visited the crash site together with the other ministers of the government, and said she was "very impressed" by the wreckage. She thanked the railway workers and emergency services for their rescue efforts. Former prime minister and then European president Herman Van Rompuy also expressed his sorrow and condolences.

=== Foreign ===
The train crash was quickly reported in the international news media, and condolences were received from multiple foreign officials. President of the European Commission José Manuel Barroso expressed his condolences to Belgium in the name of the European Commission and in his own name and sent a letter to prime minister Leterme. French president Nicolas Sarkozy offered his condolences in the name of the French people to King Albert II and stated "he was saddened when he learned of the terrible train crash which struck the country with grief". He stressed the deep solidarity between both countries. Prime minister Leterme also received condolences from British prime minister Gordon Brown and Dutch prime minister Jan Peter Balkenende.

=== Memorial ===
On Saturday 12 February 2011, a year after the crash, a bilingual French-Dutch memorial stone was unveiled on the town square of Buizingen in remembrance of the 19 deceased victims. The memorial ceremony was attended by family members of the victims, members of the emergency services, mayor Dirk Pieters of Halle, federal ministers Inge Vervotte and Annemie Turtelboom, the railway CEOs and the governors of Flemish Brabant and Hainaut. Some family members expressed hope that the NMBS/SNCB and politicians would finally commit to install automatic braking systems on each train.

On 15 February 2015, the fifth anniversary of the crash, a memorial plaque with the names of the 19 deceased victims on the memorial stone was unveiled during a ceremony.

== Cause of the crash ==
=== Initial reports ===
Initial reports suggested the Leuven–Braine-le-Comte train (heading south from Buizingen train station) was on the wrong track because of either the unauthorized running of a red signal or a technical failure in the railway signalling. During a press conference, governor De Witte confirmed that "the signals probably weren't correctly followed". It was also reported that the railway line itself was fitted with a safety system that would have caused a train that ran a red signal to brake automatically, but that not all trains were fitted with the system as well. The CEO of the NMBS/SNCB at the time, Marc Descheemaecker, replied that it was "too early to confirm a hypothesis" and that "[we] will have to carry out a neutral enquiry" but admitted that de Witte's comments were "not unbelievable". Another possible cause was reported in Le Soir, a French-speaking Belgian daily, suggesting a fault in the electricity supply could have caused a signal failure, and hence be responsible for the crash.

The possibility of a signal failure was quickly dismissed, however, since the fault would have been registered in the Brussels-South signal control center. In case of a signal failure, the signal for the Quiévrain–Liège train would have been automatically changed to red as well. It was also established that the Quiévrain–Liège train followed the signals correctly. However, the driver of the Leuven–Braine-le-Comte train, who was injured in the crash, denied he passed a red signal. He stated the signal was green.

In the weeks following the crash, multiple irregularities occurred with the signal in which it changed from green to red. On 11 March, a train had to apply emergency braking when the signal suddenly changed to red, causing it to only come to a full stop past the signal. On 15 March this occurred again, but this time the train driver was able to stop the train ahead of the signal. According to Infrabel, this was due to a strict application of the precautionary principle, which causes a signal to change to red whenever an irregularity is detected. Infrabel also said there was no danger to passengers in either of these two incidents, but the track and signal were put out of service nonetheless until the problem was solved. A theory was suggested that these defects were caused by the electromagnetic field of high-speed trains rushing past the signal on adjacent tracks.

=== Running of a red signal ===
The safety investigation carried out by the Belgian Investigation Body for Railway Accidents and Incidents (Organisme d'Enquête sur les Accidents et Incidents Ferroviaires in French; Onderzoeksorgaan voor Ongevallen en Incidenten op het Spoor in Dutch) after the crash established that the signal passed by the Leuven–Braine-le-Comte train was red. The investigation did not reveal any action from the signal control center that could have caused the signal to be green. Moreso, because the signaller had created a path for the train from Quiévrain that would cross the path of the train from Leuven, the interlocking system automatically switched the signal for the train from Leuven to red. The Investigation Body did not find any physical defect that could have caused the signal to be green instead of red. It did however reveal problems that could have made the signal less visible, but those were not of such nature that they could have caused the crash.

The prosecutor in the judicial investigation came to the same conclusion as the Investigation Body and charged the driver of the Leuven–Braine-le-Comte train with having involuntarily caused a train wreck, caused by the unauthorized passing of a red signal.

The train driver still denied running a red signal and held on to his testimony that the signal was green.

=== Absence of TBL 1+ safety system ===
A second important factor was that the Leuven–Braine-le-Comte train was not yet fitted with the TBL 1+ safety system. The TBL 1+ system causes a train to apply emergency braking if it passes a red signal or approaches a red signal too fast to be able to brake in time (> 40 km/h (25 mph)). The track in question was fitted with the system. If the train would have been fitted with the system as well, it thus would have automatically applied emergency braking upon approaching the red signal too fast and the crash thus may have never happened. This was identified in both the safety investigation by the Investigation Body as well as in the judicial investigation. The NMBS/SNCB and Infrabel had started to equip the trains and rail network with the TBL 1+ system in 2009, but the rollout over the entire network happened slowly. Because of this, the prosecutor charged both the NMBS/SNCB and Infrabel with negligence.

== Investigations ==
Three separate investigations were held in the aftermath of the crash: a parliamentary inquiry, a safety investigation by the Belgian Investigation Body for Railway Accidents and Incidents, and a judicial investigation by the judicial authorities in Brussels (and later Halle-Vilvoorde). The final report of the parliamentary commission was approved and published a year after the crash, on 3 February 2011. The report of the Investigation Body was published in May 2012. The judicial investigation however experienced significant delays due to the complicated technical aspects of the case, the transfer of the case from the Brussels prosecutor to the prosecutor of Halle-Vilvoorde, the retirement of the initial investigating judge, and litigation concerning the language of the investigation. The case was brought before the police tribunal of Halle only in June 2018.

=== Parliamentary investigation ===
==== Demand for investigation ====
Soon after the collision happened, questions arose from politicians. The minister of Public Enterprises (responsible for the NMBS/SNCB) at the time, Inge Vervotte (CD&V), asked the Railway Safety and Interoperability Service of the Federal Public Service Mobility and Transport for an overview of train protection systems from 1999 to 2010. The first decision to implement ETCS was made in 1999. Minister Vervotte wanted to track all measures regarding train safety taken since then, together with former NMBS/SNCB CEO and state secretary for Mobility at the time Etienne Schouppe (CD&V).

In the Chamber of Representatives, the lower house of the Belgian Federal Parliament, opposition parties including Groen!, N-VA, Vlaams Belang, and Lijst Dedecker asked for a formal parliamentary investigative commission to research the circumstances of the crash and railway safety in general. The majority parties however wanted to wait until the Infrastructure commission of the Chamber would have met on Monday 22 February, a week after the crash. In the meeting on 22 February, the three CEOs of the Belgian rail companies Luc Lallemand ( Infrabel), Marc Descheemaecker (NMBS/SNCB) and Jannie Haek (NMBS/SNCB-Holding) and minister Vervotte were heard by the commission about investments in railway safety. The most important question asked was why an automatic braking system like TBL 1+ was not yet implemented across the entire rail network, nine years after the Pécrot rail crash. It was eventually decided a special Chamber commission (not an investigative commission however, which has more powers) would be installed to look into the crash and railway safety in general. The end of the commission's work was initially foreseen to be before the summer of 2010. The work of the commission was disrupted however by the resignation of the Leterme II Government and the following general elections. The commission eventually approved its report on 3 February 2011. The report consisted of more than 300 pages and contained 109 recommendations for avoiding similar crashes in the future.

In its investigation, the commission also relied on reports from the Court of Audit, the European Railway Agency, and other experts, made on request of the commission. The Court of Audit reviewed investments made by the NMBS/SNCB and Infrabel, whilst the Agency assessed the functioning of the Railway Safety and Interoperability Service and the Investigation Body for Railway Accidents and Incidents.

==== Identified shortcomings ====
In the report, the commission concluded that the general railway safety level in Belgium did not undergo any meaningful improvements from 1982 to 2010, unlike that in foreign countries and despite the deadly crashes in Aalter in 1982 and in Pécrot in 2001. The NMBS/SNCB was said to have had a reactive attitude towards safety during that period. The lack of safety improvements could not be explained by lacking investment budgets. The preference for national companies in public tenders for safety systems and the preference of the NMBS/SNCB for self-developed systems however was said to have had an impact on the speed with which systems were rolled out. Favouring national companies in public tenders was made illegal in the European Union in 1993, but the Court of Audit said that recent safety investment projects regarding GSM-R and ETCS could have been done better nonetheless.

The parliamentary report confirmed that, even when ETCS would be fully rolled out in the future, the human factor would remain very important in railway safety. It criticized the complex hierarchy within the railway companies, preventing a proper information flow in both directions, and other occupational stress factors including lack of punctuality, irregular working schedules, and lack of participation and autonomy as having an impact on safety. It also mentioned the rising incidence of red signals passed, from 82 incidents in 2005 to 117 in 2009 (a rise of 43%), and distraction being reported as the main cause (52%). It was said the incidents were too often analysed on an individual basis instead of the underlying causes and trends being analysed. The existing plans of action at the time to combat the passing of red signals were said to be ineffective and yielding too few results. A train stopping between a double yellow signal and a red signal was mentioned as having an increased risk of running the red signal.

The commission also reviewed the company culture at the rail companies, more specifically the safety culture. It was said the companies each had a proper safety policy but lacked an integrated safety culture. Safety was too often only a concern of front-line personnel instead of being subject to systemic planning and risk analysis. The further development of a complete safety culture was considered to be necessary, given the future challenges expected for the railways.

Additionally, other problems cited were a problematic transposition of European directives regarding railways and rail safety into national law, insufficient resources for the Railway Safety and Interoperability Service, an unclear division of responsibilities between the Service and Infrabel, and a lack of cooperation between the Service and the Investigation Body for Railway Accidents and Incidents.

==== Recommendations ====
Regarding train protection systems, the commission recommended the further rollout of the TBL 1+ system as planned without any delay, which was due to be completed by 2013 for the rolling stock and 2015 for the rail infrastructure. However, an evolution to a system in line with the ERTMS specifications that allows full control over a train's speed was deemed necessary. In this regard, the rollout of ETCS1 was to be continued as well. The commission also stated all locomotives fitted with ETCS1 had to be equipped with ETCS2, and the further rollout of ETCS2 had to be studied and considered.

Regarding the factor of human errors in railway safety, the commission underscored the need for improvement in the railway companies' human resources management, more specifically in the recruitment of new personnel and the training of both new and existing personnel. To reduce stress on train drivers, more attention needs to be given to their scheduling, the communication with them and their participation in the company. Regarding the passing of red signals in particular, the commission stated the need to replace badly visible signals or to install repeater signals. A better feedback culture needed to be created within the railway companies to report problems such as bad signalling. A thorough analysis has to be made of each incident of a red signal passed, as part of a proactive safety culture. Procedures on how to handle the passing of a red signal need to focus less on the punishment of the train driver and more on how to avoid similar incidents in the future.

Regarding safety culture, the commission warned that a one-sided focus on safety technology would be insufficient, and that safety always has to be approached in an integrated way. It recommended an audit of and the improvement of safety culture across the board. More thorough risk inventorisation, risk assessment, and follow-up on measures taken was deemed necessary. More participation of front-line personnel in railway safety was to be encouraged, and the company hierarchy was to be simplified to improve the flow of information regarding safety.

Other recommendations included improvements in the independence, the financing, the staffing, and the functioning of the Railway Safety and Interoperability Service and the Investigation Body for Railway Accidents and Incidents, and the development of measurable safety indicators.

==== Follow-up ====
The European Railway Agency published a report in 2013 on the corrective measures taken by the Railway Safety and Interoperability Service and the Investigation Body for Railway Accidents and Incidents in response to the parliamentary recommendations.

=== Safety investigation ===
The Investigation Body for Railway Accidents and Incidents (Organisme d'Enquête sur les Accidents et Incidents Ferroviaires in French; Onderzoeksorgaan voor Ongevallen en Incidenten op het Spoor in Dutch) carries out safety investigations into railway crashes for the purpose of improving general railway safety. Their investigations are explicitly not meant to cast guilt or blame upon anyone, which remains the responsibility of the judicial authorities. The Investigation Body published its report in May 2012.

==== Running of a red signal ====
The investigation by the Investigation Body did not reveal any action from the signaller in the signal control center that could have caused the signal to be green for the train from Leuven. Moreso, because the signaller had created a path for the train from Quiévrain that would cross the path of the train from Leuven, the interlocking system automatically switched the signal for the train from Leuven to red. The Investigation Body did not find any physical defect that could have caused the signal to be green instead of red, and therefore considers it as established that the signal was in fact red. The Investigation Body also analysed the possible reasons as to why the red signal could have been passed by the driver. It found that there were problems that could have made the signal less visible, but those were not of such nature that could have caused the running of the signal. It also did not find any physical or physiological condition that could have explained a poor perception of the color of the signal. Nor was distraction, abnormal fatigue, time pressure, or stress found to be a plausible cause, aside from the fact that the driver had had a short night's sleep. A possible explanation could be found in the psychological and more specifically the cognitive aspects of the train driver's activities in the operational context in which he found himself. Regarding this theory the train driver could have erroneously assumed the signal was green because of the combination of a slightly lessened attention due to the driver's short night's sleep and a routine reaction to the signal that the train's doors were closed. The Investigation Body made recommendations to decrease the risk of such situations in the future.

==== Automatic protection systems ====
The risk of unauthorized passages of red signals was not an unknown scenario however; there is always a certain risk of such situations occurring due to complex psychological reasons and shortcomings in human reliability on which mankind will never fully have a grasp. Because of this, the Investigation Body stated that the only solution is the adoption of automatic train protection systems: systems that can monitor a train's speed and apply the brakes automatically, such as the TBL 1+ system that was being rolled out since 2009. Aside from such systems, a corrective system should also be implemented for the cases where a red signal is passed. Such corrective systems did not exist yet at the time. In more general terms, the Investigation Body stated more attention should go to a corrective system for all situations in which there is a loss of control, and to passive safety.

==== Safety culture ====
The Belgian railway companies were already aware of the impossibility of eliminating human errors and of the need of technological solutions to combat red signals being passed for almost a decade. However, this knowledge did not sufficiently translate in concrete actions being taken. As reasons for this, the Investigation Body mentioned the cultural heritage of the railway companies, which was characterised by a reactive attitude and a normative response to crashes focused on ground personnel. The common cultural perception was that the main responsibility rested with the train drivers and that the problem of red signals being passed could thus be solved through training and punishments, amongst other strategies. The importance of monitoring systems and automatic braking in improving railway safety was not sufficiently recognised, and the eventual recognition of its importance was not sufficient to also introduce such systems quickly and effectively. The Investigation Body also found a certain weakness in the designated National Safety Authority (the Railway Safety and Interoperability Service of the Federal Public Service Mobility and Transport), which caused an important shift in the responsibility for safety management to Infrabel, the national railway infrastructure operator. Nevertheless, the Railway Safety and Interoperability Service was the only independent service that could mandate an integrated approach to safety. This weakness was the result of important delays in meeting deadlines of regulatory requirements. The approval and management of risk management methods and the systemic and organisational analysis of incidents remained incomplete, despite the application of the relevant European Union directive.

==== Accelerated rollout of TBL 1+ ====
Infrabel and the SNCB/NMBS proposed a plan for the accelerated rollout of TBL 1+ on the level of the rolling stock by the end of 2013 and on the level of the railway infrastructure by the end of 2015. This schedule was considered acceptable by the Investigation Body. However, because TBL 1+ does not provide complete monitoring of a train, the Investigation Body noted that this catch up could only serve as a transitional measure towards the implementation of ETCS by the two companies.

=== Judicial investigation and indictments ===
==== Opening of the investigation ====
The Brussels Royal Prosecutor, Bruno Bulthé, opened an investigation and announced the appointment of an investigating judge from the Dutch-speaking tribunal of first instance of Brussels, Jeroen Burm, to oversee the judicial enquiry. The investigating judge delegated the investigation to the railway police and appointed two boards of experts: a medicolegal board and a technical board of five experts, including engineers and computer scientists, to research all possible causes of the crash. The first report of the technical board was ready two years later, but in March 2013 the judge requested further technical investigation. The additional report was finished in February 2014. A month later, the case was transferred to the newly created Halle-Vilvoorde prosecution office as a result of the judicial reform that came into force in 2014 following the sixth Belgian state reform. The Halle-Vilvoorde prosecutor concluded that there were sufficient indications of guilt and asked the investigating judge in June 2014 to hear and if necessary indict the (surviving) train driver of the train driving to Braine-le-Comte, the NMBS/SNCB and Infrabel. The train driver and representatives of the NMBS/SNCB and Infrabel were heard in September 2014 and formally indicted by the investigating judge.

==== Delays in the investigation ====
In 2015 however, the investigating judge retired, causing the case to be taken over by a new judge. The train driver also asked for a French translation of certain documents, which he received from the railway police in March 2015. In March 2015, the NMBS/SNCB and Infrabel also submitted their remarks to the technical investigation, and their representatives were again interrogated by the railway police in June 2015. In July 2015, the train driver's defence petitioned the tribunal to hold the investigation in French rather than Dutch and to transfer the case to a French-speaking judge, since the train driver speaks French. In Belgium, the use of language in public affairs is a sensitive topic and is extensively regulated. The tribunal rejected, and an appeal was struck down in October 2015 as well. A cassation appeal was lodged with the Court of Cassation, the Belgian supreme court, but was later retracted by the train driver in January 2016. The train driver was finally heard in July 2016. In the meantime, many other witnesses were heard as well, and the last processes-verbal of the hearings were added to the case in September 2016. The investigating judge concluded the investigation at the end of September 2016 and sent it back to the Halle-Vilvoorde prosecution office to decide on whether and whom to prosecute.

==== Final charges ====
After the long delays in the case, the Halle-Vilvoorde prosecutor formally asked the Brussels tribunal of first instance in November 2016 to summon the train driver, the NMBS/SNCB, and Infrabel to the police tribunal of Halle, which has original jurisdiction in Belgium over traffic offences. According to the prosecutor it was established that the train driver ignored a red signal light, which constituted the basis of the crash, despite the train driver contesting this. In addition, the prosecutor stated that Infrabel and the NMBS/SNCB were guilty of negligence with regards to respectively the safety of rail infrastructure and the operating of trainsets without appropriate safety systems. The tribunal was to decide on the summons on 24 April 2017. At the hearing however, a request was made for additional investigation. A new hearing was planned for March 2018.

In March 2018, the tribunal of first instance in Brussels definitively decided that the driver, the NMBS/SNCB, and Infrabel would be held to account before the police tribunal of Halle. The train driver's defence announced that it would ask the police tribunal to have the case tried in French instead of Dutch.

== Court trial ==
=== Halle police tribunal ===
The opening session of the case before the police tribunal was held on 5 June 2018. Due to the large number of people expected, the tribunal exceptionally held session in a nearby community cultural centre. Before the start of the trial, 65 people had made themselves known to the investigating judge as civil parties to the case. In the Belgian justice system, people who believe they have suffered damage as the result of a crime can become civil parties to the case and ask for compensation during the trial. During the opening session, an additional 25 people made themselves known as civil parties, bringing the total number of civil parties to 90. As announced, the train driver's defence asked for a language change to French, to which the prosecutor objected.

The police tribunal refused the language change because granting so would pose a risk of exceeding the reasonable time and the statute of limitations (which would expire in 2021). The police tribunal of Halle deemed it "unbelievable" that the police tribunal of Brussels could still try the case in 2018, because all documents (encompassing 46 cartons) would have to be translated to French, and because a new judge and prosecutor would have to familiarize themselves with the case. The police tribunal also blamed the indicted train driver of having tried all avenues to delay the case, including the earlier language-related litigation, which caused 34 months of delays. Additionally, the police tribunal argued the "equality of arms" would be jeopardised, because the lawyers for the defence were already familiar with the case, but a new prosecutor from Brussels would never be able to become as familiar with the case as the current Halle-Vilvoorde prosecutor. Further handling of the case was postponed to 14 November 2018.

=== Language change to French ===
The train driver's defence however appealed the refusal to grant the language change at the arrondissement tribunal of Brussels, where Dutch-speaking and French-speaking judges decide together on language matters regarding court cases. In October 2018, the arrondissement tribunal ruled that the language change should have been granted and that the trial should be held in French instead of Dutch. This meant that at least a part of the documents of the case had to be translated to French. The president of the French-speaking tribunal of first instance of Brussels, Luc Hennart, stressed that the case would be prioritised so as to avoid the statute of limitations setting in. The train driver's defence was satisfied with the ruling but denied intentionally trying to stall the case. The defence indicated that only the most important documents had to be translated, as far as they were concerned. On the other hand, some victims of the crash reacted with dismay to the news, because the case was dragging on for so long already and because of the risk of the statute of limitations setting in.

=== Brussels police tribunal ===
==== Introductive hearing on 8 January 2019 ====
On 8 January 2019, the trial restarted in French before the French-language police tribunal of Brussels with an introductive hearing, which served mainly to decide on the calendar of the hearings for the trial. The introductive hearing took place in one of the courtrooms of the court of appeal of Brussels in the Palace of Justice. During the introductive hearing, the train driver's defence argued that the technical expertises were established in a non-contradictable way, stating that the train driver's input was never heard by the experts, and thus the experts' reports should be rejected (the audi alteram partem principle). Infrabel's defence pleaded similarly, causing the tribunal to rule that the matter would be the subject of in-depth debates. Hearings of the ten experts who led the technical investigations were also requested by all parties. It was decided that the testimonies of the experts would be heard on 19 February, whilst final pleas would only be heard in September 2019.

==== First expert hearing on 19 February 2019 ====
On 19 February 2019, the first expert hearing took consequently place before the tribunal. The experts stated that the crash was a shared responsibility of both the train driver and the two train companies (the NMBS/SNCB and Infrabel). According to them, the train driver had caused the crash by running a red signal, whilst the NMBS/SNCB and Infrabel had not complied with safety rules. Multiple safety systems that could have prevented the crash had not worked properly either, according to the experts. They further explained that they ruled out the possibility of deliberate sabotage due to not finding any evidence on it. More specifically, tests had demonstrated that manipulation of the railway signal was very unlikely, and no traces of unauthorized entry or sabotage (not even footprints in the snow) were found at the signal cabin. Therefore, the experts concluded that the railway signal must have operated correctly and must have been red for the train driver. The defence of the train driver also asked a question about a green signal that is visible in a television news report about the crash from Belgian public broadcaster RTBF, to which one of the experts responded that the question could not really be answered without more details.

==== Second expert hearing on 26 February 2019 ====
During a second expert hearing on 26 February 2019, they provided clarity on the green signal from the television report. According to them, the green signal visible in the report had nothing to do with the crash. They explained that on the day the television report was made (20 February 2010), the place had just been released by the investigating judge, after which Infrabel had recovery operations carried out that morning. The signal was made green for those operations; according to the recording device of the signal involved it was made green at 10:02 am for a few minutes. The experts concluded that the signal must have been filmed as green by chance. They also added that the same recording device registered the signal as being red at the moment of the crash. They adhered to their position that there was not a single technical indication that the signal was green at the moment of the crash. The defence attorneys of Infrabel also produced a process-verbal in which the signal change to green made by Infrabel was noted.

==== Pleas ====
After the second expert hearing, the different parties to the case were given a few months to prepare and exchange their conclusions. The beginning of the pleas was scheduled for 16 September 2019, and the eventual judgment for the end of 2019.

On 16 September 2019, the prosecutor requested a fine of €700,000 for the SNCB, a fine of €650,000 for Infrabel, and a suspended three-year jail term for the train driver. After the pleas, on 19 September, the prosecutor changed her request for the train driver to a determination of guilt, and she did not demand a penalty anymore. She followed the defence argument that only those who made the gravest error, in this case the railway operator and the infrastructure manager, should be punished. Sentencing is planned on 3 December.

== Accelerated rollout of TBL 1+ ==
Following the crash, the NMBS/SNCB and [Infrabel planned an accelerated rollout of TBL 1+ on the level of the rolling stock (1.021 locomotives and self-propelled trains) by the end of 2013, and on the level of the railway infrastructure by the end of 2015. By the end of 2012, Infrabel planned on equipping 4,200 signals with the system, in comparison with the 650 equipped signals at the beginning of 2010. In July 2011, 52% of all rolling stock had been equipped with TBL 1+, in comparison with only 2.5% at the beginning of 2010.

However, the installation of TBL 1+ was only foreseen for signals on risky rail junctions (where there is a risk of a crash if a red signal is passed). The amount of signals at these risky junctions is about 70% of the more than 10,000 railway signals in Belgium. Signals not equipped with TBL 1+ can for example be found on freight lines.

In September 2014, all national rolling stock had been equipped with TBL 1+ as planned, and Infrabel had installed the system on 93% of the signals at risky junctions. Infrabel foresaw that 99.9% of all these signals (7,573 signals in total) would be fitted with TBL 1+ by the end of 2015, as planned.

However, international trains (such as the Benelux train) were exempted from the requirement to install TBL 1+. This exemption was eventually lifted, and in November 2016, the last of these trains were fitted with the system. By the end of 2016, freight operators such as B-Logistics also had fitted all their trains with TBL 1+. Since December 2016, trains without TBL 1+ are prohibited from driving on the Belgian railway network.

== Death Note controversy ==
In late 2017, it was revealed that Netflix film Death Note used images of the crash in the movie. Many of the survivors and the rail operator have condemned this as disrespectful.

== See also ==
- 1996 Maryland train collision, also resulting from a station stop between two signals
- List of rail accidents (2010–2019)
- Pécrot rail crash
- Winter of 2009–2010 in Europe
