= Forest-South railway station =

Railway station in Brussels, Belgium

Forest-South
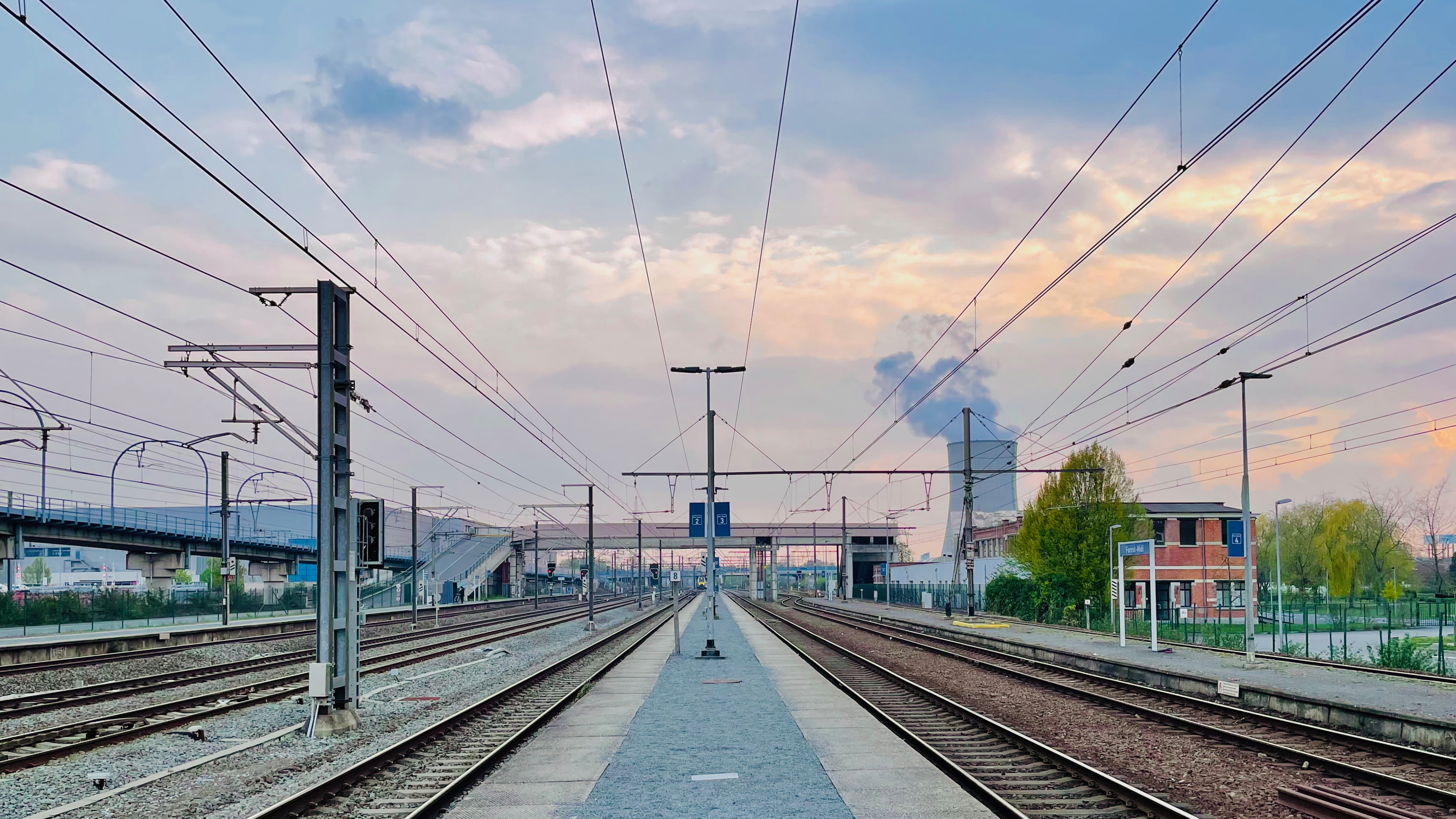
- Forest-South railway station

General information
- Location: Forest, Brussels-Capital Region; Belgium
- Coordinates: 50.8087°N 4.3091°E
- System: Railway Station
- Owner: SNCB/NMBS
- Operator: SNCB/NMBS
- Line: 96 (Brussels-Hautmont)
- Platforms: 2
- Tracks: 4

Other information
- Station code: FO

History
- Opened: 1862; 164 years ago

Passengers
- 2014: 345 per day
Location
- Location within Belgium Location within Europe

Forest-South railway station (French: Gare de Forest-Midi; Dutch: Station Vorst-Zuid) (Note: Officially Forest-South (French: Forest-Midi; Dutch: Vorst-Zuid)) is a railway station in the municipality of Forest in Brussels, Belgium, opened in 1862. The station is located on line 96, between Brussels-South and Ruisbroek railway stations. The train services are operated by the National Railway Company of Belgium (NMBS/SNCB).

== Train services ==
The station is served by the following service(s):

- Brussels RER services (S2) Leuven - Brussels - Halle - Braine-le-Comte

Preceding station	NMBS/SNCB	Following station
Bruxelles-Midi / Brussel-Zuid towards Leuven	S 2	Ruisbroek towards Braine-le-Comte

== See also ==
- List of railway stations in Belgium
- Rail transport in Belgium
- Transport in Brussels
- History of Brussels
