= Braine-le-Comte railway station =

Railway station in Hainaut, Belgium

Braine-le-Comte
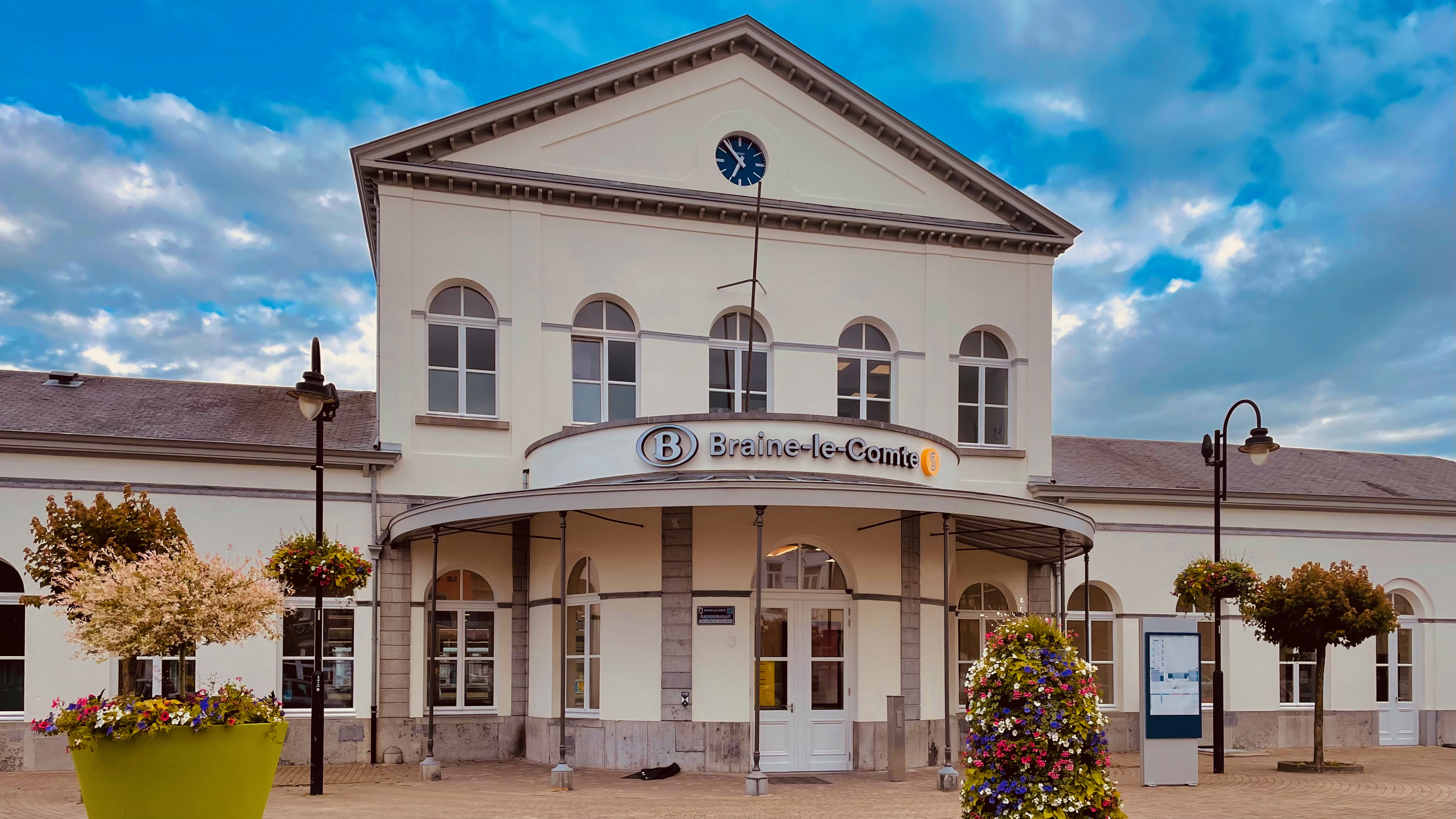
- Braine-le-Comte railway station

General information
- Location: Braine-le-Comte, Hainaut; Belgium
- Coordinates: 50°36′21″N 4°08′19″E
- System: Railway Station
- Owner: SNCB/NMBS
- Operator: SNCB/NMBS
- Lines: 96, 117, 123
- Platforms: 9
- Tracks: 15

Other information
- Station code: FBC

History
- Opened: 31 October 1841; 184 years ago

Passengers
- 2009: 4,653 per day
Location
- Location within Belgium Location within Europe

Braine-le-Comte railway station (French: Gare de Braine-le-Comte; Dutch: Station 's-Gravenbrakel) (Note: Officially Braine-le-Comte (French: Braine-le-Comte; Dutch: 's-Gravenbrakel)) is a railway station in Braine-le-Comte, Hainaut, Belgium. The station opened on 31 October 1841 and is located on railway lines 96, 117 and 123. The train services are operated by the National Railway Company of Belgium (SNCB/NMBS).

== Train services ==
The station is served by the following services:

- Intercity services (IC-06A) Mons - Braine-le-Comte - Brussels - Brussels Airport
- Intercity services (IC-11) Binche - Braine-le-Comte - Halle - Brussels - Mechelen - Turnhout (weekdays)
- Intercity services (IC-14) Quiévrain - Mons - Braine-le-Comte - Halle - Brussels - Leuven - Liege (weekdays)
- Intercity services (IC-22) Binche - Braine-le-Comte - Halle - Brussels - Mechelen - Antwerp (weekends)
- Local services (L-04) Jurbise - Braine-le-Comte (weekdays)
- Local services (L-19) Braine-le-Comte - Ecaussinnes - Manage (weekdays)
- Brussels RER services (S2) Braine-le-Comte - Halle - Brussels - Leuven

Preceding station	NMBS/SNCB	Following station
Soignies towards Mons	IC 06A	Bruxelles-Midi / Brussel-Zuid towards Brussels National Airport
Ecaussinnes towards Binche	IC 11 weekdays	Tubize towards Turnhout
Soignies towards Quiévrain	IC 14 weekdays	Halle towards Liège-Guillemins
Ecaussinnes towards Binche	IC 22 weekends	Tubize towards Antwerpen-Centraal
Soignies towards Jurbise	L 04 weekdays	Terminus
Terminus	L 19 weekdays	Ecaussinnes towards Manage
Terminus	S 2	Hennuyères towards Leuven

== Gallery ==
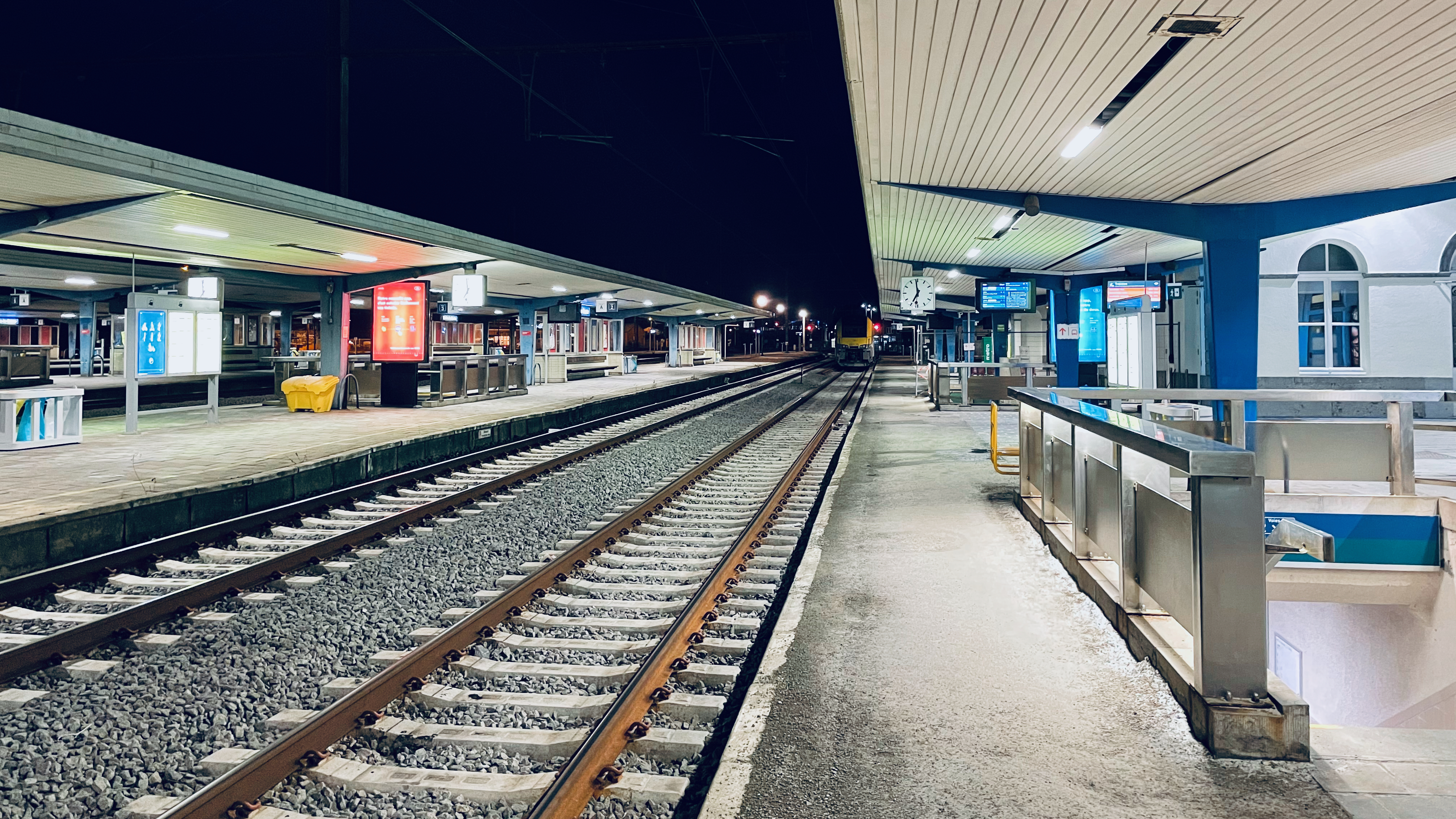
View of the platforms and tracks

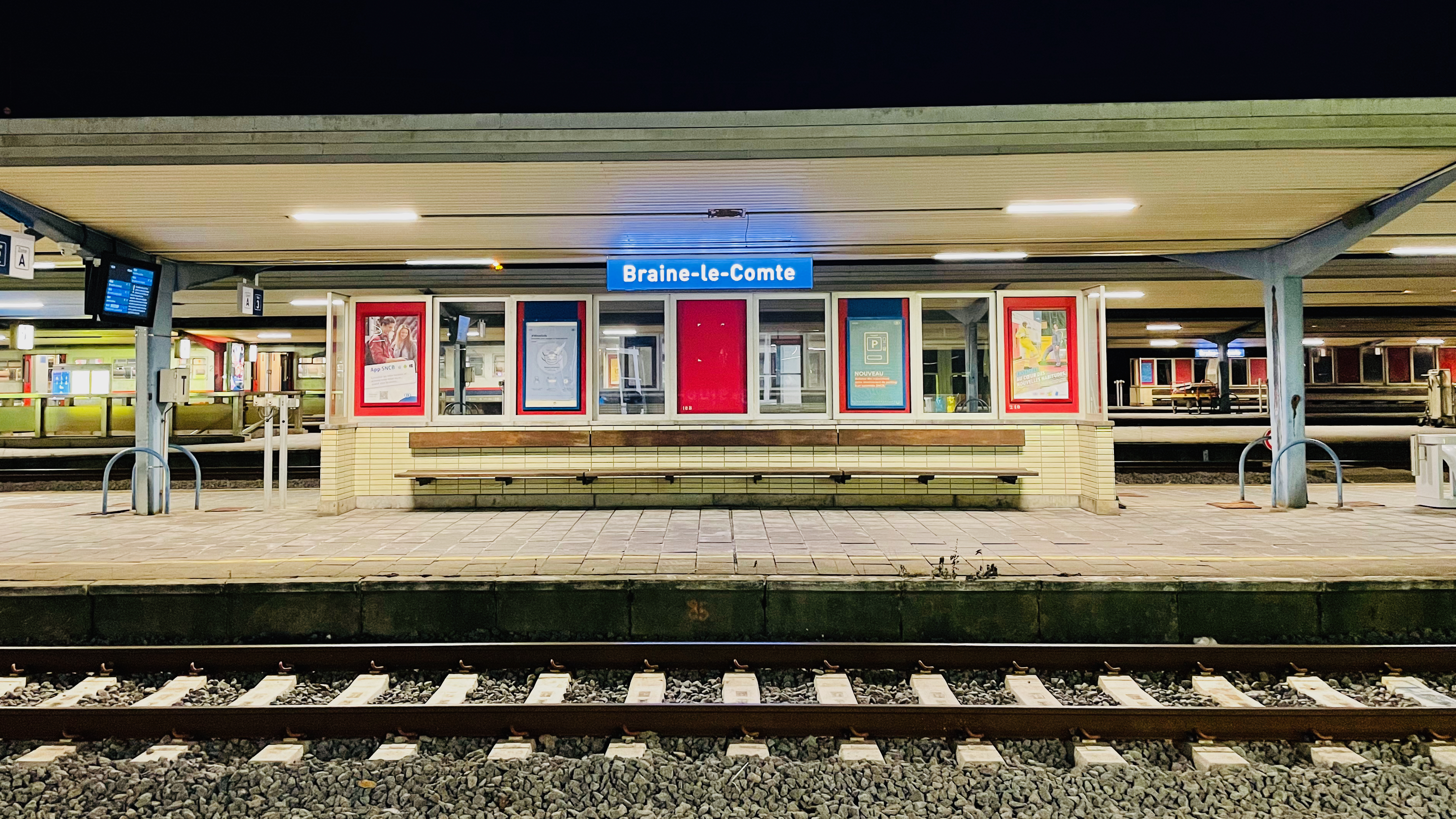
Place name sign on a platform

== See also ==
- List of railway stations in Belgium
- Rail transport in Belgium
