= Mons railway station =

Railway station in Hainaut, Belgium

Mons
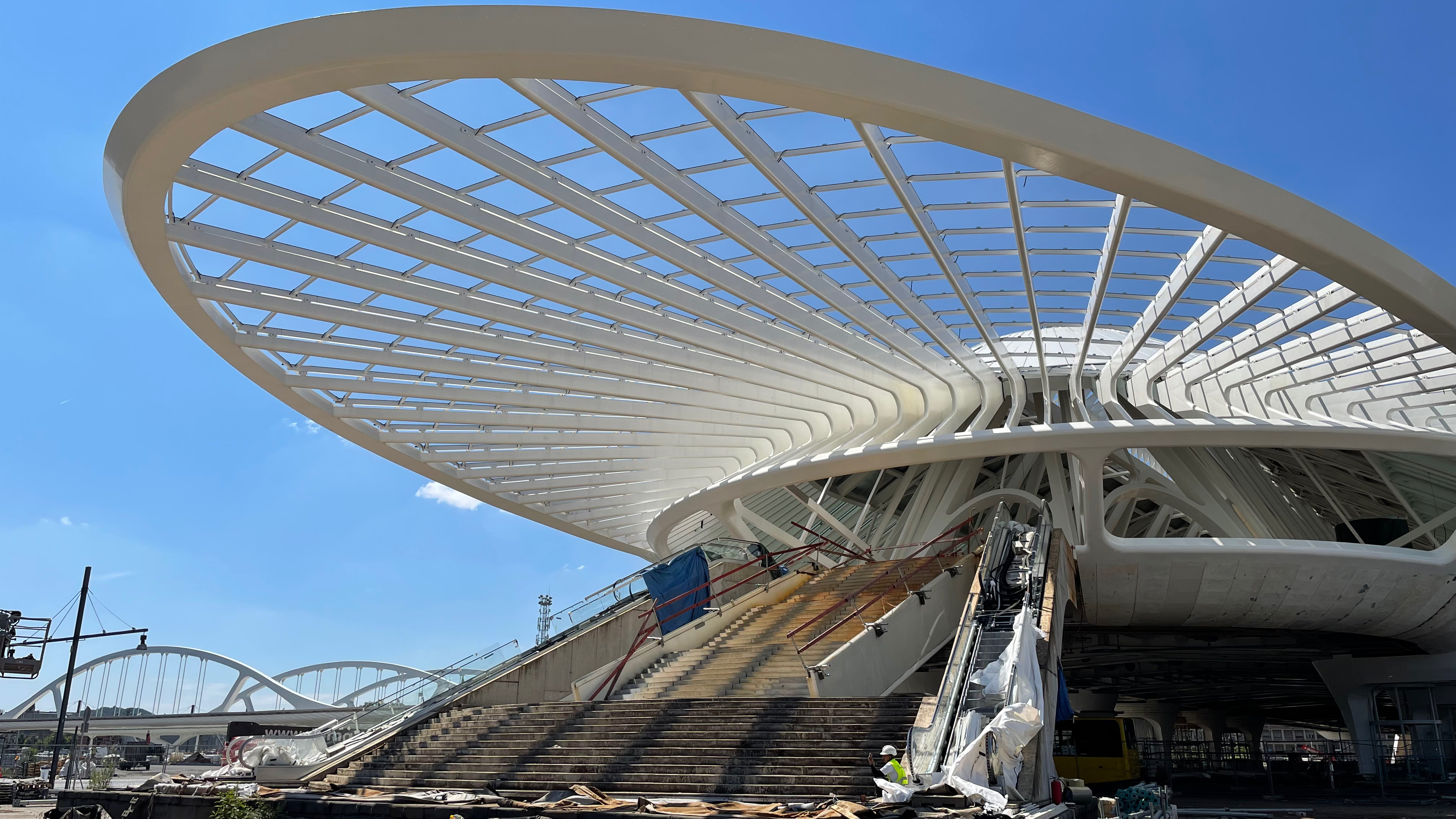
- New station under construction in 2022

General information
- Location: Mons, Hainaut; Belgium
- Coordinates: 50.45408°N 3.94176°E
- System: Railway Station
- Owner: SNCB/NMBS
- Operator: SNCB/NMBS
- Lines: 96, 97, 118
- Platforms: 7
- Tracks: 21

Other information
- Station code: FMS

History
- Opened: 19 December 1841; 184 years ago

Passengers
- 2009: 8,556 per day
Location
- Location within Belgium Location within Europe

Mons railway station (French: Gare de Mons; Dutch: Station Bergen) (Note: Officially Mons (French: Mons; Dutch: Bergen)) is a railway station in Mons, Hainaut, Belgium. The station opened on 19 December 1841 on railway lines 96, 97 and 118. The train services are operated by the National Railway Company of Belgium (SNCB/NMBS).

The station was served by a daily Thalys high-speed rail service to Paris between 1998 and 31 March 2015.

== History ==
=== First station (1841–1874) ===
The first station in Mons was opened on 19 December 1841. The inauguration of the first railway line in Belgium between Brussels and Mechelen dates back to 1835. King Leopold I and the Belgian government promoted railway development to extend the network across the Belgium's borders. In Hainaut, a huge network of industrial lines was created. The main lines, both state and private, approached Mons. The original building, inaugurated in 1842, was located on the current site of the Place Léopold. The exponential evolution of the railway very quickly rendered the first station insufficient, and 30 years after its construction, it was replaced by a new one.

=== Second station (1874–1952) ===
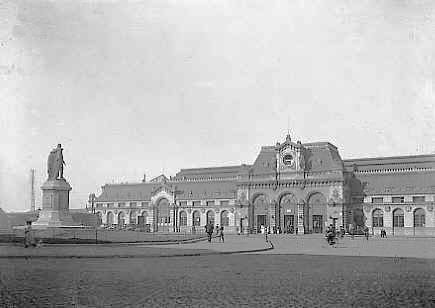
The second Mons railway station (1874), pictured during the 1930s

A new station was built and put into service in 1874, this new and majestic infrastructure built in the neo-Romanesque style was designed by the engineer Van Der Sweep. It had a central body surmounted by a large clock framed by statues representing Commerce and Industry, and on either side, two long wings whose facades were decorated with numerous bays surmounted by sixteen coats of arms symbolising the province and the main towns of the country. A large iron and glass canopy also covered the 8 lines serving Mons at the back of the station. The building and its glass roof were severely damaged at the end of the Second World War during bombing raids by the American army on 10 May 1944. A complete reconstruction was necessary. After a short rehabilitation, it was demolished and replaced, in successive phases, by a more modern building, inaugurated in 1952.

=== Third station (1952–2013) ===
Minister Achille Van Acker laid the foundation stone for the new station on 8 December 1947. The station was inaugurated in 1952 and was designed by René Panis, a French architect from Montpellier. The building had a Soignies stone cladding on all four facades, as well as an imposing clock in a typical 1950s style.

The station contained a superb fresco by Jacques D'Hondt in its main hall or salle des pas perdus (literally meaning "room of the lost steps"). Perched about 10 metres (33 ft) above the ground, it offered, on three walls, an overview of the socio-cultural and folkloric life of the Mons-Borinage region. The work was commissioned as part of the festivities for the 1958 Brussels World's Fair (Expo 58). It was designed by the local painter and decorator Jacques D'Hondt, who produced it on wooden panels. Damaged by time, the work was replaced in May 2001, for the 75th anniversary of the SNCB, by a new fresco created by the Turkish artist Dogan Cakir, who had notably decorated the Thalys reception hall in Brussels-South railway station. The station also contained magnificent stained glass windows, the work of Zéphyr Busine and Georges Boulmant, as well as reliefs sculpted in Soignies stone by Raoul Godfroid. The 1952 station was definitively closed on 24 March 2013, after 61 years of existence, and was demolished at the end of June 2013 to make way for a new project signed by the Spanish architect Santiago Calatrava.

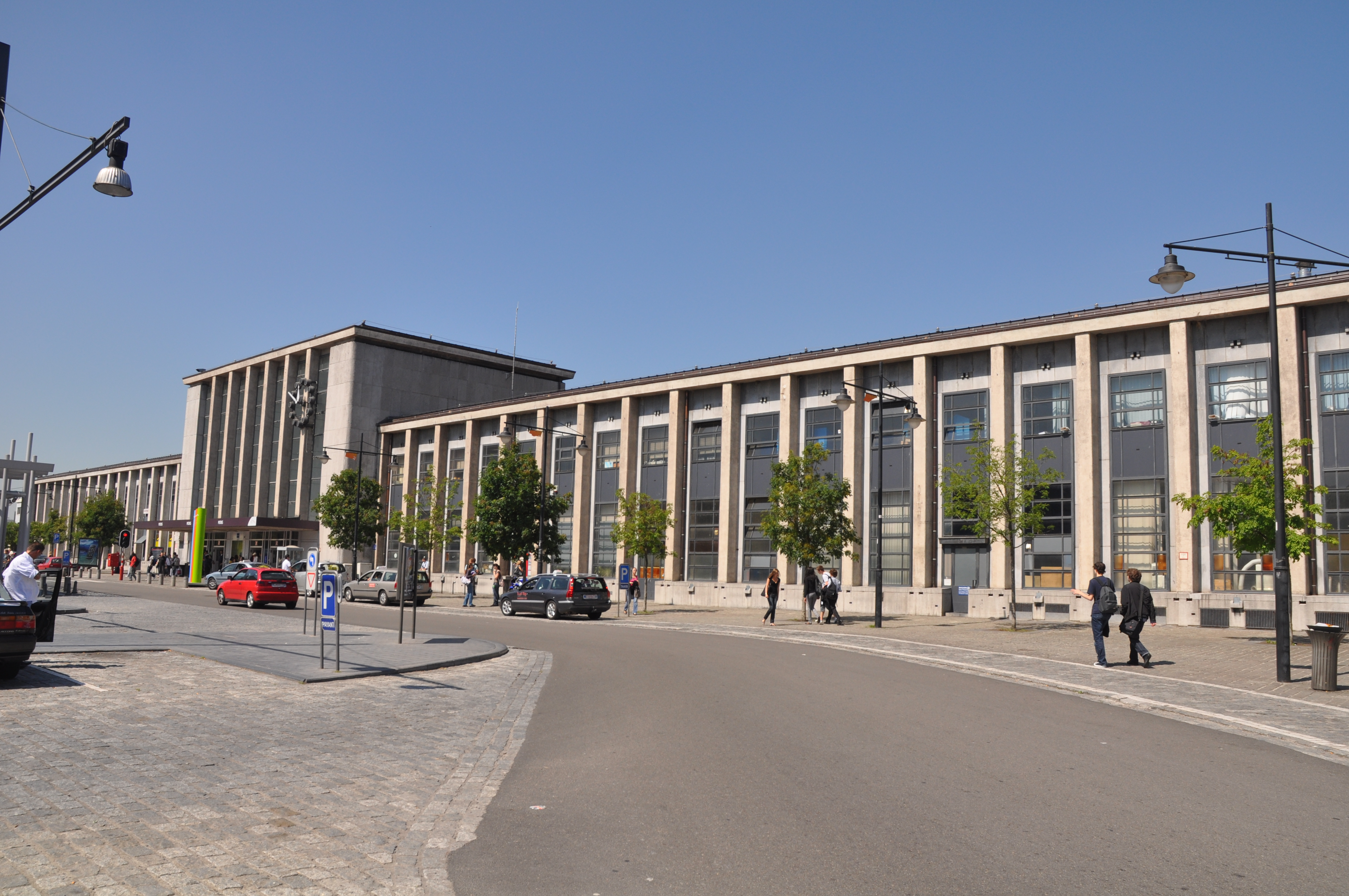
The third Mons station by René Panis (1952), before its 2013 demolition

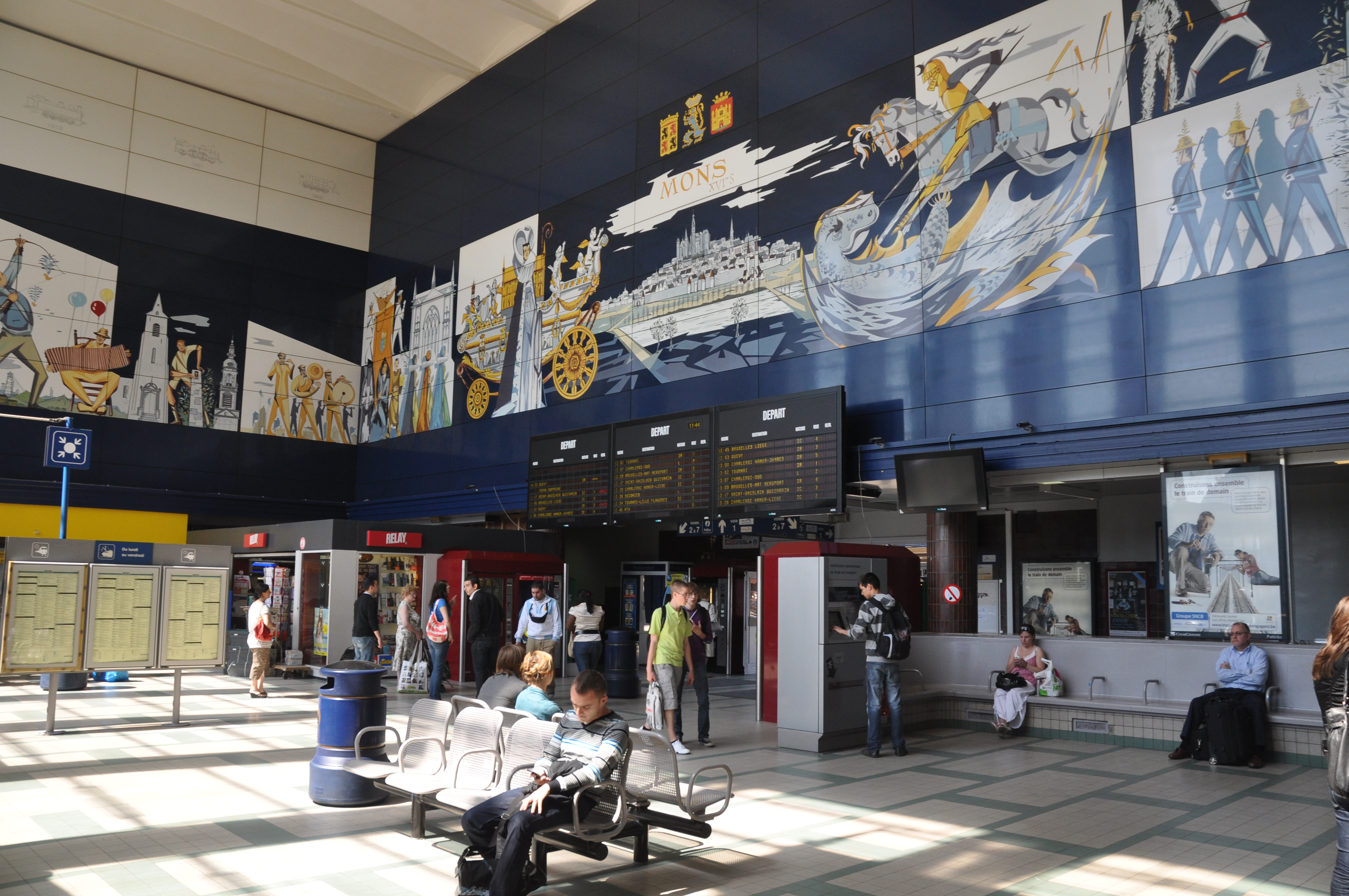
Fresco by Jacques D'Hondt (1952) inside the station (demolished)

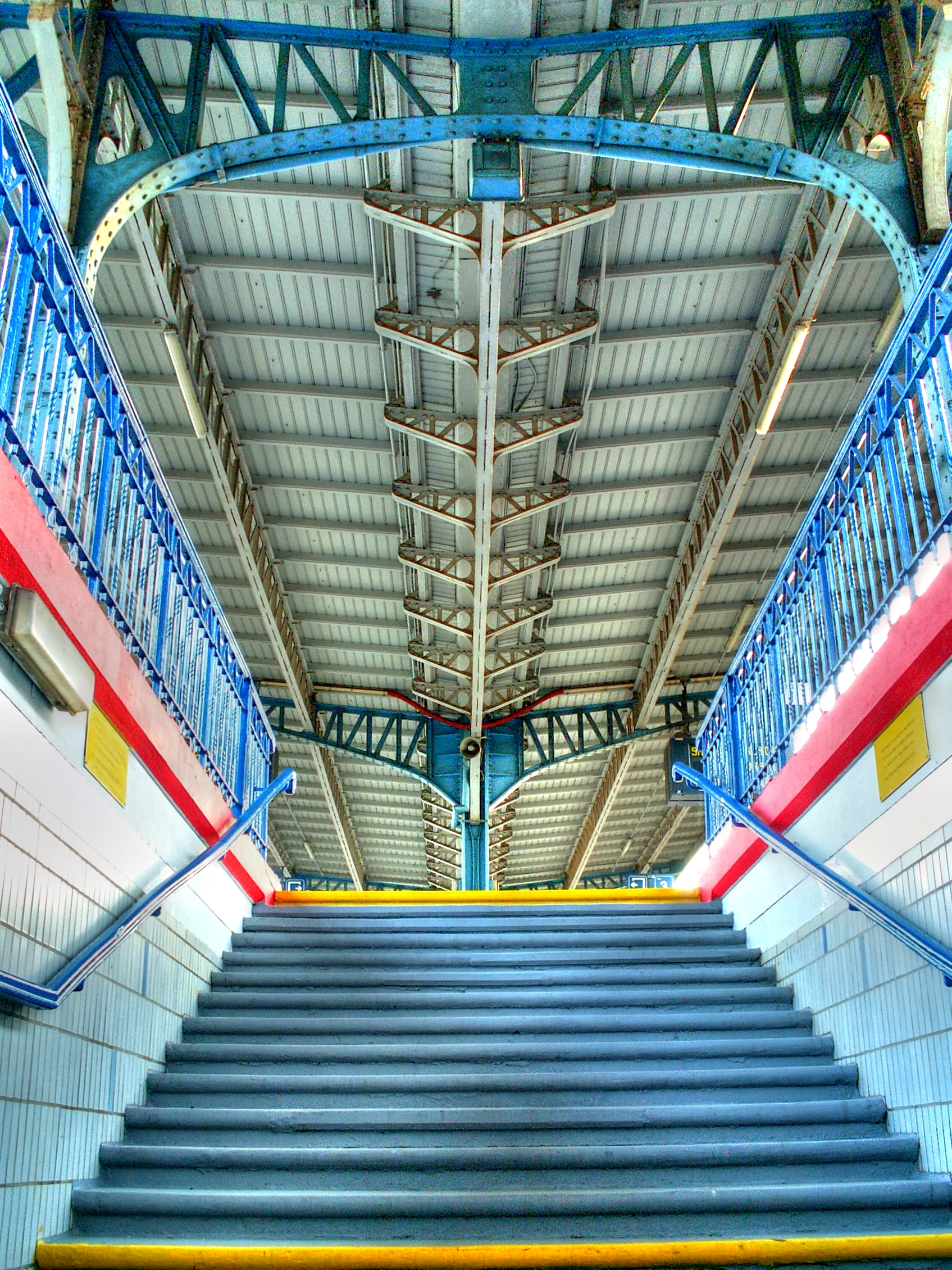
Stairs to the station's platforms before 2013

== New station ==
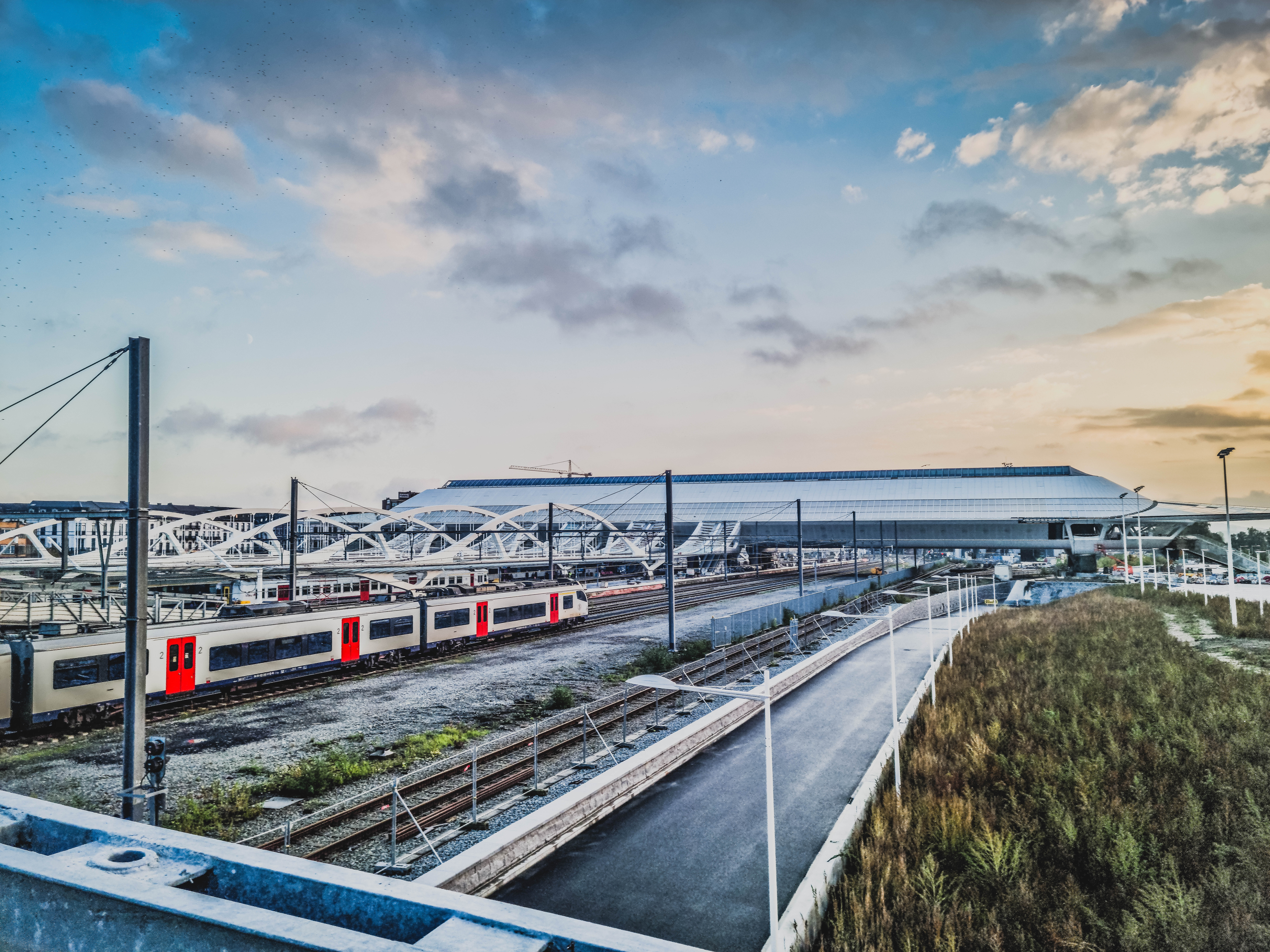
The new station under construction in October 2022. The photo was taken from the temporary footbridge.

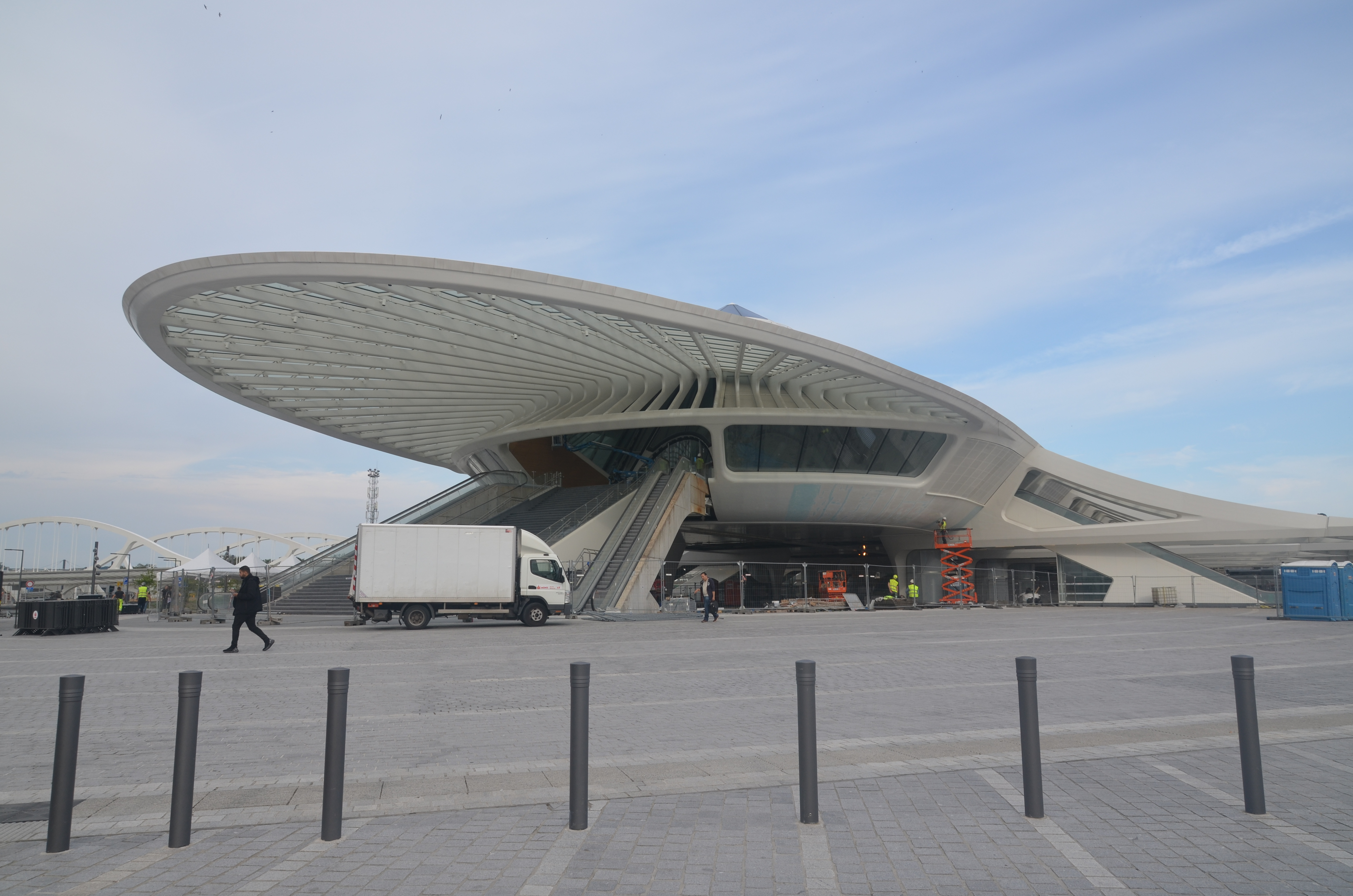
The new station in July 2024.

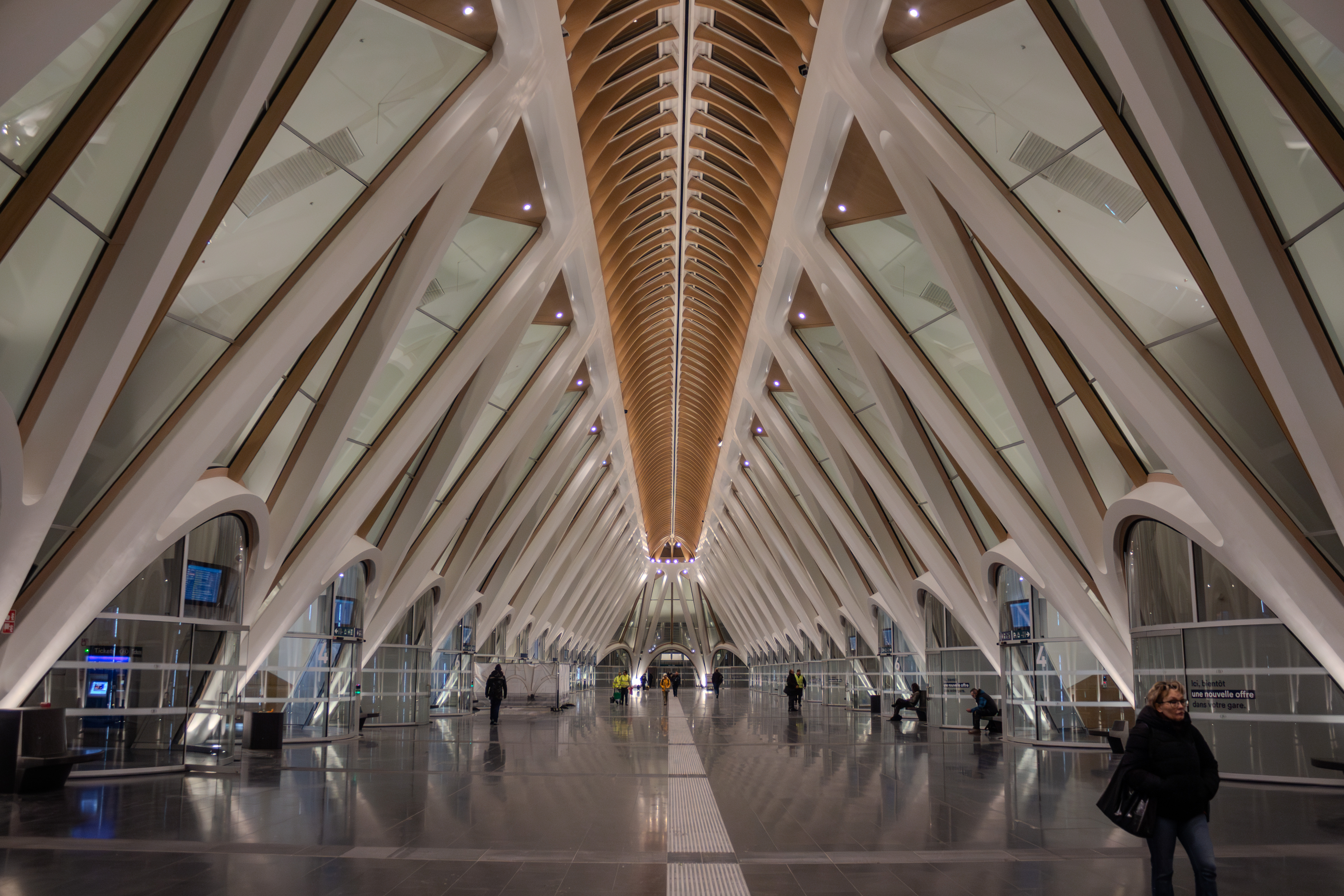
View of the platform of the new station, December 2024

In 2004, the SNCB decided to undertake a major modernisation of the site by refocusing the station on passenger transport. It entrusted Euro Liège TGV (which became Eurogare in 2010) with the tasks of studying and monitoring the resulting works. The preliminary project studies, on the rail infrastructure and passenger reception aspects, highlighted a series of objectives in terms of rail transport; these include to reduce the number of sidings and goods depots in order to enhance the commercial and passenger reception potential; to free up space in order to allow the site to be crossed and the double accessibility of the station to be achieved; to standardise the length of the platforms (350 m) and their width (8.50 m) and to adapt the route of line 118 (Walloon backbone) in order to increase the speed of entry to the station.

In terms of passenger reception, the aim is to improve the quality of the reception infrastructure and meet current standards for people with reduced mobility; to facilitate access to the platforms from the square and the car parks; to optimise accessibility to the station and intermodality; to link the historic centre of Mons and the Grands Prés site; to develop a car park with a minimum capacity of 800 spaces and to make the most of the land freed up in connection with the station (Charles-Quint and Gendebien boulevards).

In order to develop a quality, innovative project, integrating the functional, architectural, urban planning and environmental dimensions set out in the identification of objectives, Eurogare decided to call on an external architectural firm and launched a competition in January 2006 (contract notice at Belgian and European level). The aim of this competition was to produce an architectural and urban design sketch for the general development of the station site. This development includes a landscaped car park, an overhead link between the Place Léopold, the station and the Grands Prés site, including the service to the platforms via existing and future accesses. At the end of this competition, the design of this complex was entrusted to the engineer and architect Santiago Calatrava, and in October 2006, the sketch model of this first act of the modernisation of the Mons site was made public. Calatrava had to build his station while leaving the 1952 station intact. This was a quality that distinguished him from the other candidates in the 2006 competition. The 1952 station was then destined to disappear, according to the SNCB, the project has "evolved", "matured".

The renovation was initially planned to cost €37 million in 2006 for a general development of the station site that did not include the railway infrastructure and the redevelopment of the passenger building, but which envisaged the construction of a footbridge leading to the Grands Prés - Shopping de Wallonie commercial area. This project became over the years that of a fully modernised "gateway station" requiring much heavier investments amounting to €150 million in 2012, €263 million in 2017, €324 million in 2020 and €332 million in 2022 while the Court of Audit published a report highlighting several irregularities in the evolution of the project.

The new "gateway station" was originally planned to be opened at the beginning of 2015, but due to numerous delays caused by the bankruptcy of various parties, it did not open until December 2024 and was officially inaugurated in January 2025. In the meantime, passengers have to use a temporary station. This is made of assembled containers and can accommodate 100,000 passengers per week. The prefabricated elements are of the same type as those used for the temporary station in Liège-Guillemins.

Since 2015, the provisional station no longer accommodates the TGV to Paris, which used to take 1 hour 20 minutes, because the Thalys company, which manages the line, decided to "sacrifice" the line Namur-Charleroi-Mons-Paris as it was considered too unprofitable. Travellers wishing to go to the French capital were forced to go via Brussels or Lille, until the launch of a low-cost Ouigo service in 2025.

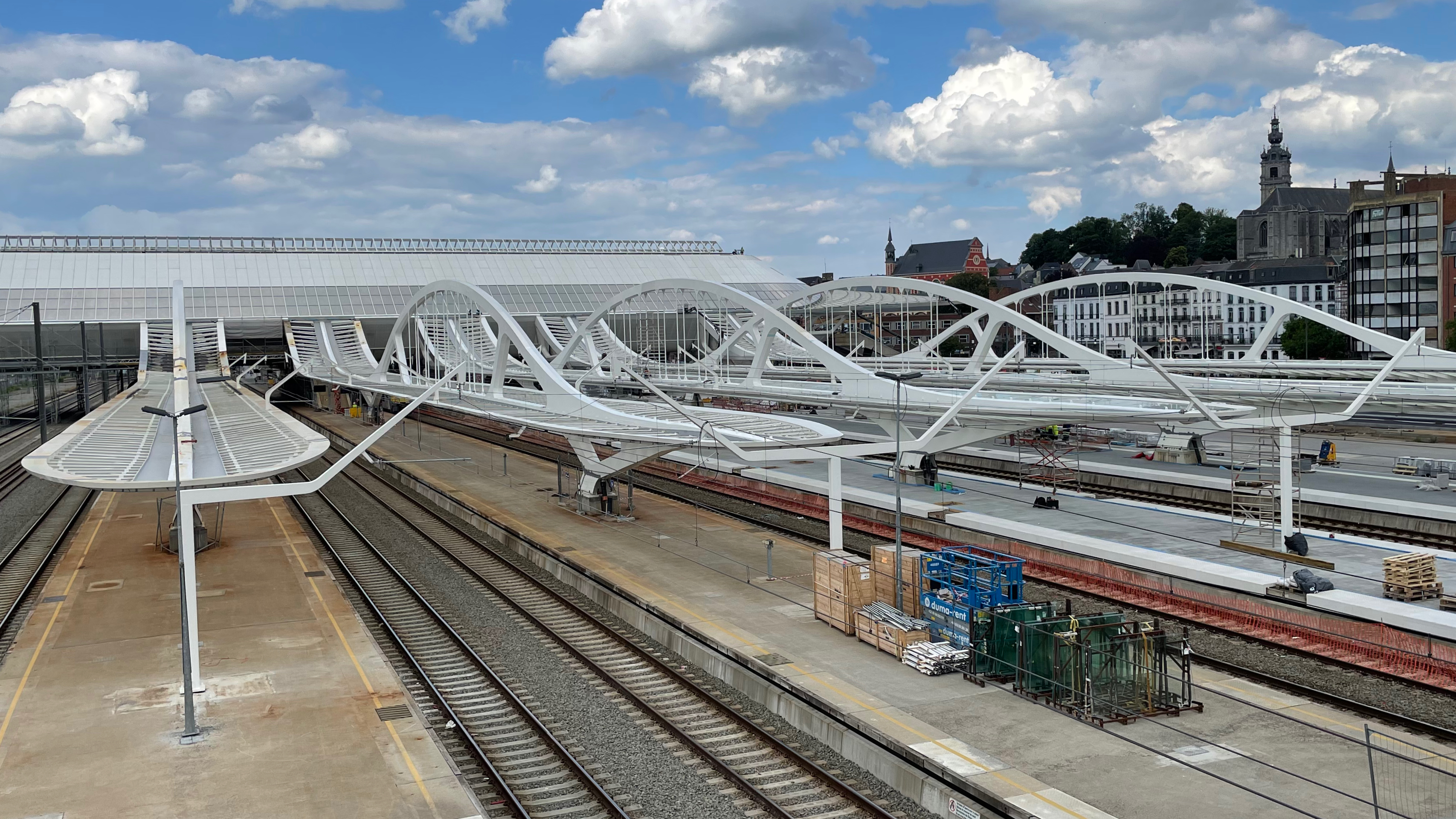
View of the platforms

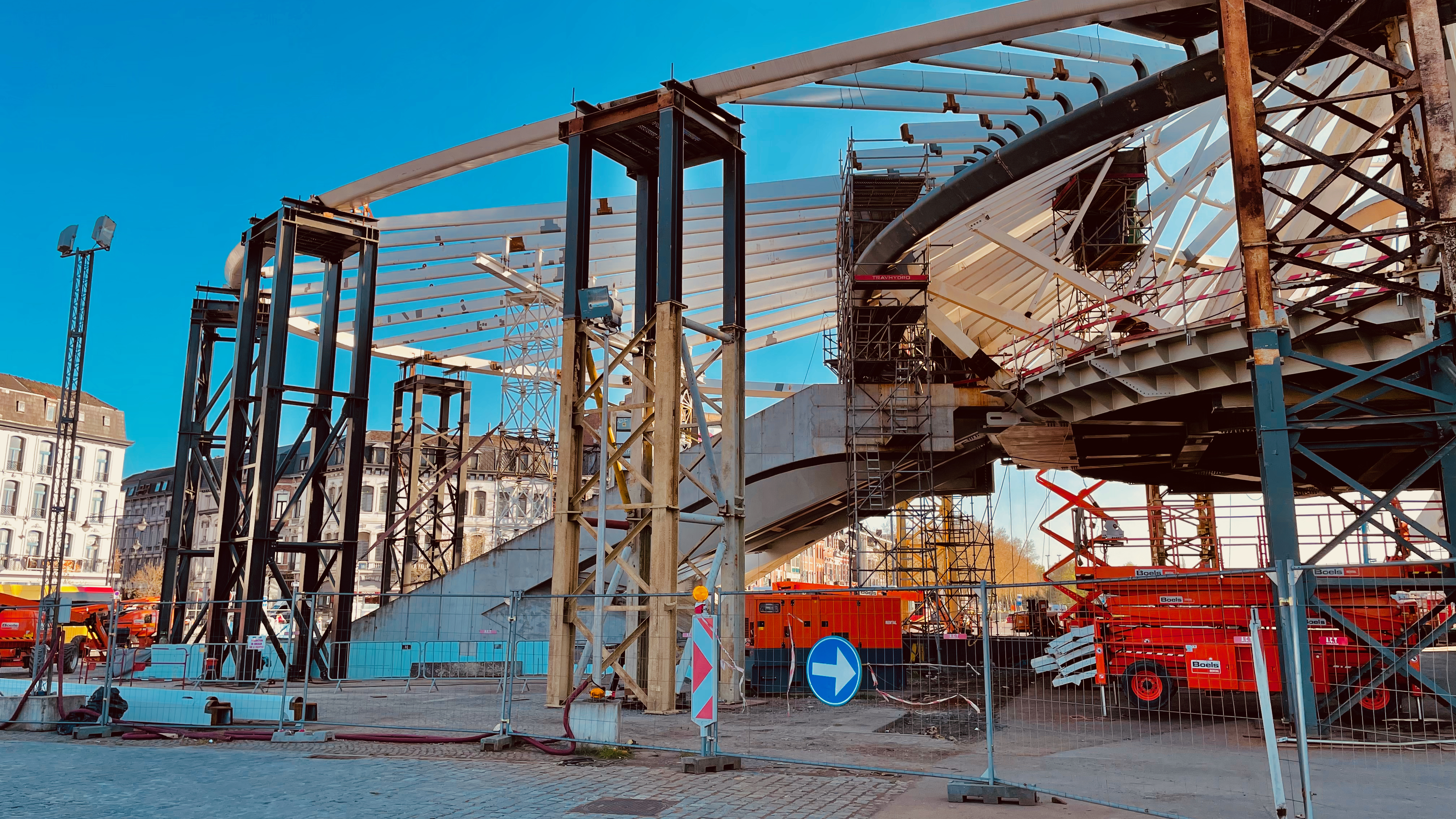
The construction of the new station

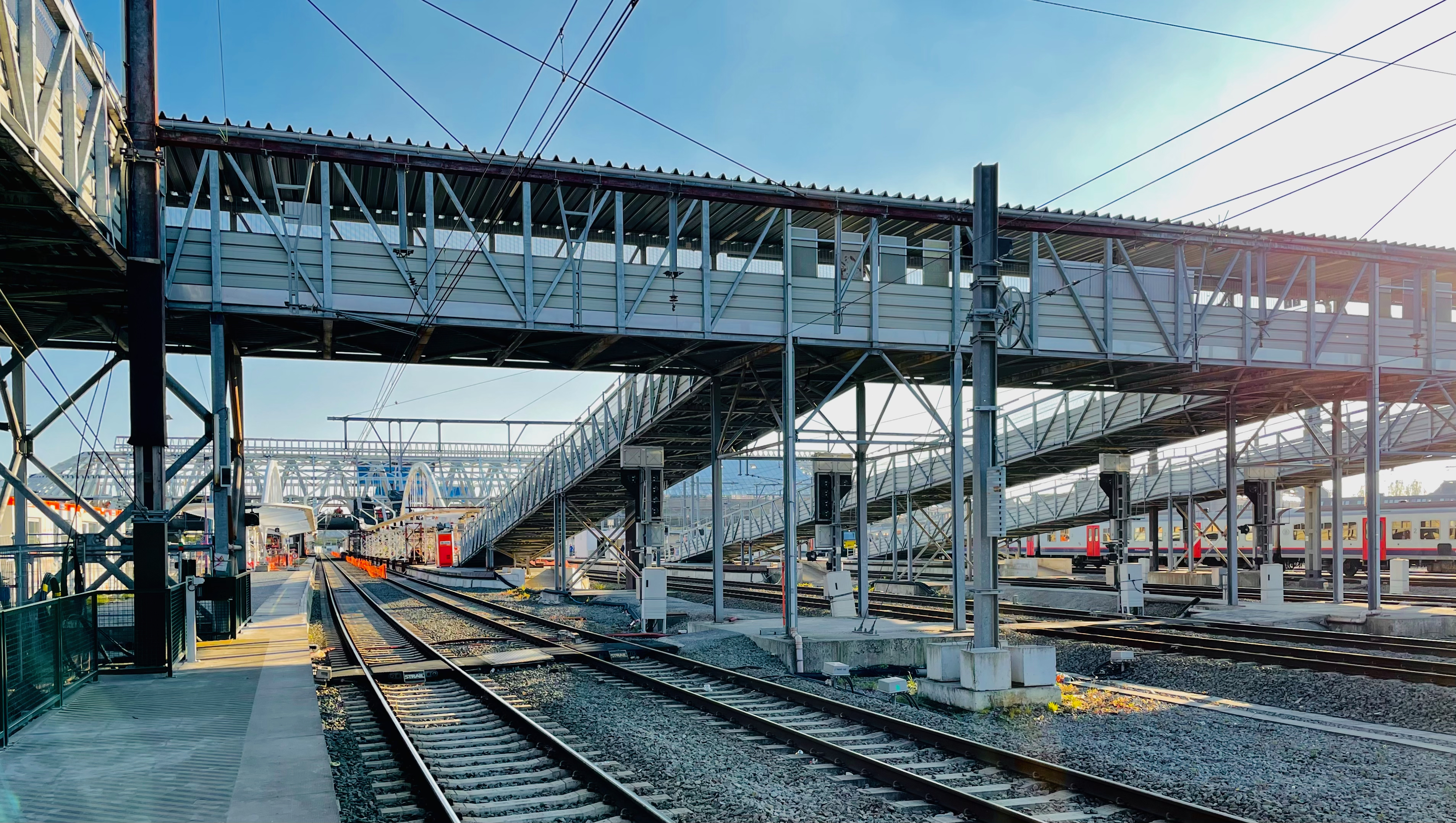
View of the tracks

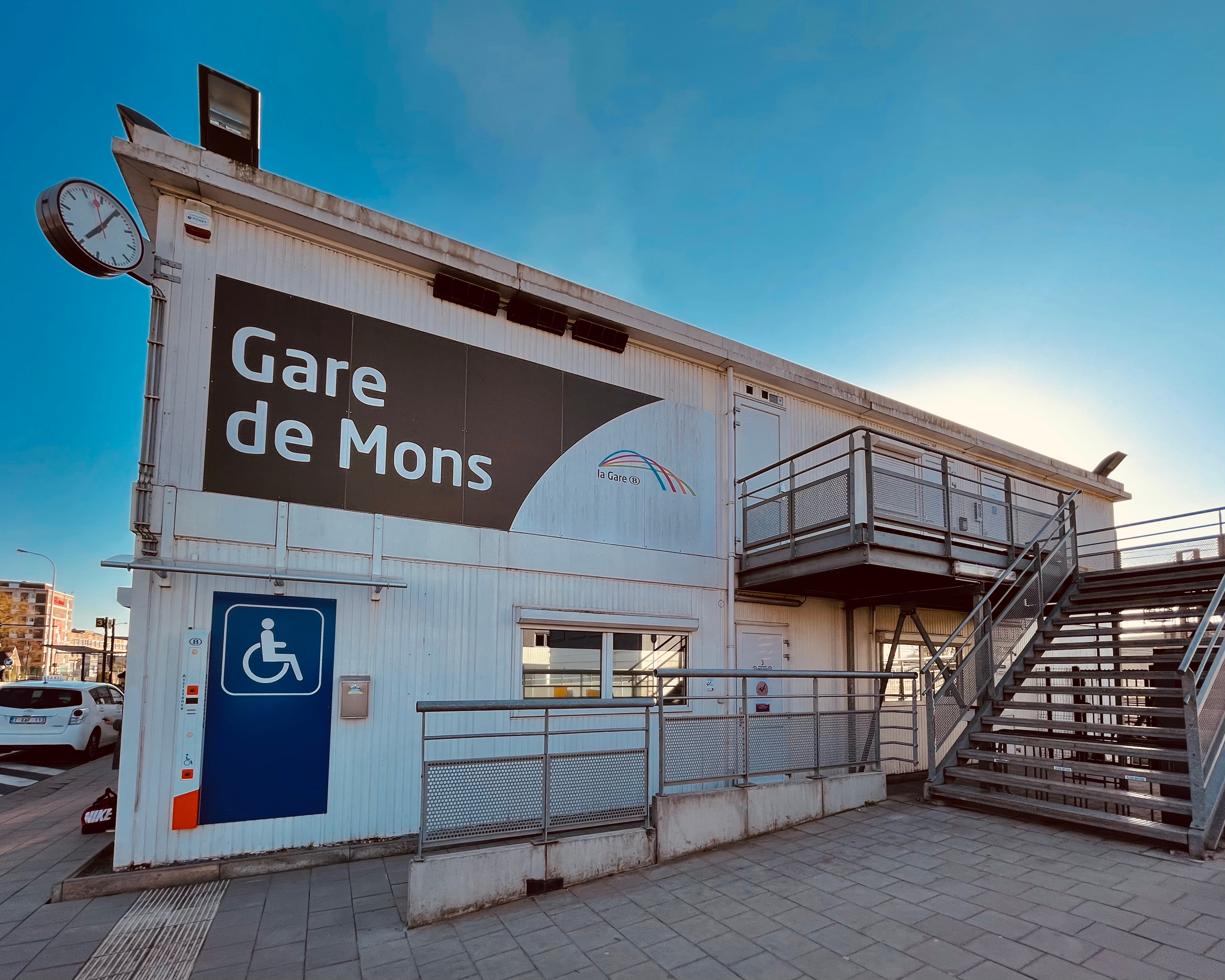
The temporary station building

== Traveller services ==
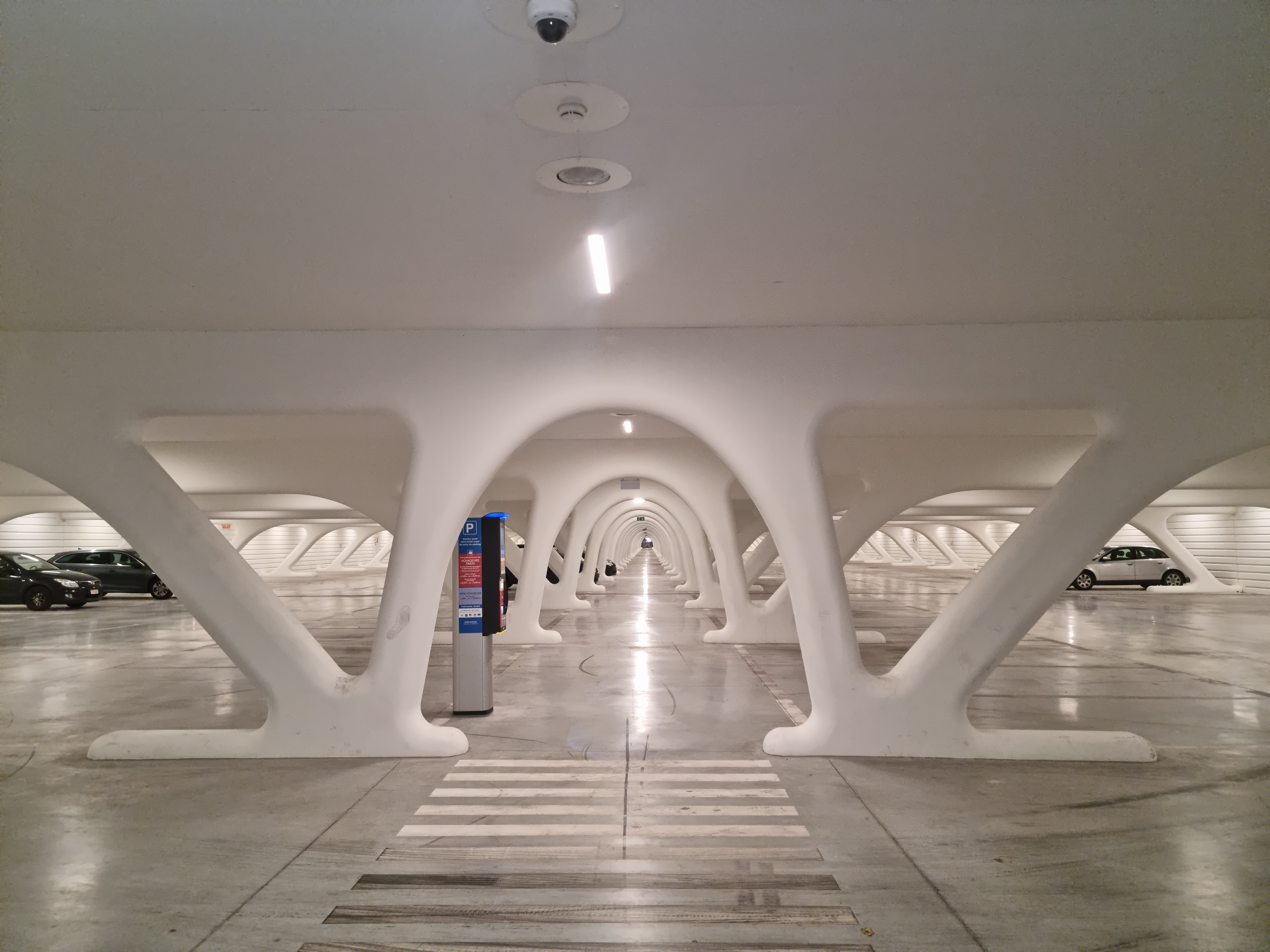
The P2 car park which opened in April 2022

The SNCB station has a temporary passenger building made of assembled containers with ticket offices, open every day. Facilities, equipment and services are available for people with reduced mobility. A footbridge connects the old town with the new commercial and offices area of Les Grands Près. A new underground car park, the P2 opened in April 22 and a similar one, the P1, is expected to open in 2023.

== Train services ==
The station is served by the following services:

- Intercity services (IC-06A) Mons - Brussels - Brussels Airport
- Intercity services (IC-14) Quiévrain - Mons - Braine-le-Comte - Brussels - Leuven - Liège (weekdays)
- Intercity services (IC-19) Lille - Tournai - Saint-Ghislain - Mons - Charleroi - Namur
- Intercity services (IC-25) Mons - Charleroi - Namur - Huy - Liege (weekdays)
- Intercity services (IC-25) Mouscron - Tournai - Saint-Ghislain - Mons - Charleroi - Namur - Huy - Liege - Liers (weekends)
- Local services (L-18) Quiévrain - Saint-Ghislain - Mons (weekends)
- Local services (L-26) Quévy - Mons - La Louvière (weekdays)
- Local services (L-26) Mons - La Louvière (weekends)
- Local services (L-29) Tournai - Saint-Ghislain - Mons - Ath - Geraardsbergen (weekdays)
- Local services (L-29) Mons - Ath - Geraardsbergen (weekends)
- Local services (K81) Mons - Aulnoye-Aymeries (Ending in December 2022)

Preceding station	NMBS/SNCB	Following station
Terminus	IC 06A	Jurbise towards Brussels National Airport
Jemappes towards Quiévrain	IC 14 weekdays	Jurbise towards Liège-Guillemins
Saint-Ghislain towards Lille-Flandres	IC 19	La Louvière-Sud towards Namur
Terminus	IC 25 weekdays, except holidays	La Louvière-Sud towards Herstal
Jemappes towards Mouscron	IC 25 weekends	La Louvière-Sud towards Liers
Saint-Ghislain towards Quiévrain	L 18 weekends	Terminus
Frameries towards Quévy	L 26 weekdays, except holidays	Nimy towards La Louvière-Sud
Terminus	L 26 weekends	Nimy towards La Louvière-Sud
Jemappes towards Tournai	L 29 weekdays, except holidays	Ghlin towards Geraardsbergen
Terminus	L 29 weekends	Erbisoeul towards Geraardsbergen
Preceding station	TER Hauts-de-France	Following station
Terminus	Krono K81	Aulnoye-Aymeries Terminus

== See also ==
- List of railway stations in Belgium
- Rail transport in Belgium
