= Buizingen =

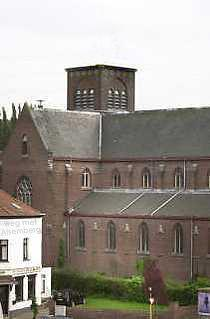
- Church of Saint Vincentius

- Location in Belgium pushpin_map = https://commons.wikimedia.org/wiki/File:Belgium_Flemish_Brabant_location_map.svg
- Coordinates: 50°44.5′N 04°14.8′E
- Country: Belgium
- Region: Flemish Region
- Community: Flemish Community
- Province: Flemish Brabant
- Municipality: Halle

Population
  - Total: 5,300
- Postal code: 1501

Buizingen is a village in the municipality of Halle, Belgium. It is around 15 km southwest of the centre of Brussels.

On 15 February 2010, 19 people died and 171 were injured in a train collision in Buizingen.
