= Belgian railway line 96 =

Railway line between Brussels and Quévy, Belgium

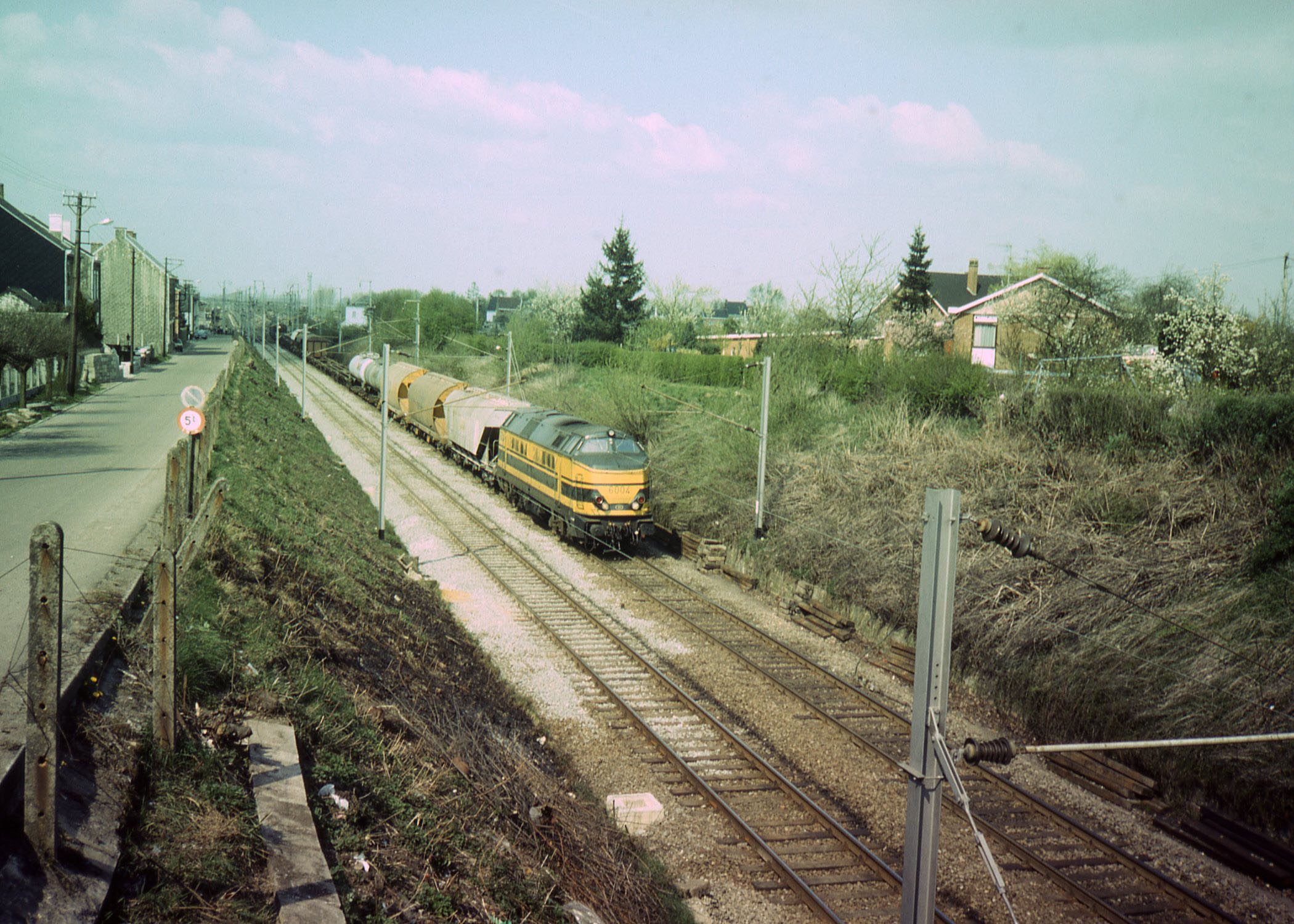
- A freight train on line 96 in 1982

Overview
- Status: Operational
- Locale: Belgium
- Termini: Brussels-South; Quevy
- Stations: 21

Service
Services
- Operator(s): National Railway Company of Belgium

History
- Opened: 1840-1858

Technical
- Line length: 85 km (53 mi)
- Number of tracks: Double
- Track gauge: 1,435 mm (4 ft 8 1/2 in) standard gauge
- Electrification: Overhead line, 3,000 V DC
Route map
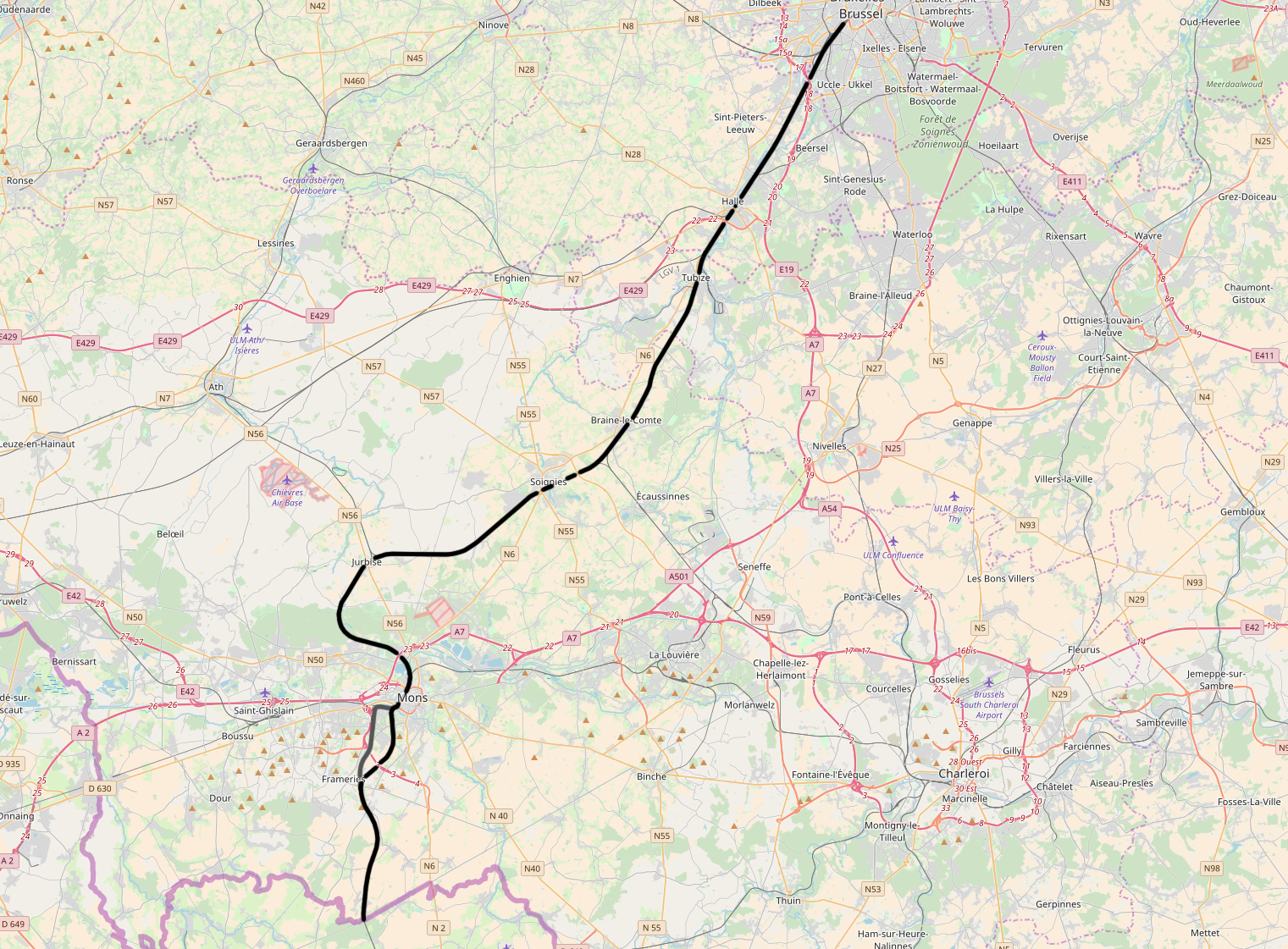

The Belgian railway line 96 is a railway line in Belgium connecting Brussels to Quévy at the border with France. A railway line then connects Quévy to Paris, France, which forms the old Brussels-Paris railway line. The line is used by TGV and Eurostar trains between Brussels and Lembeek.

The first section of line 96 opened in 1840 between Brussels and Tubize. The final section between Hautmont and the Belgian-French border was opened in 1858.

The following stations are located on this line:

- Brussels-South
- Forest-South
- Ruisbroek
- Lot
- Buizingen
- Halle
- Lembeek
- Tubize
- Hennuyères
- Braine-le-Comte
- Soignies
- Neufvilles
- Masnuy-Saint-Pierre
- Jurbise
- Erbisoeul
- Ghlin
- Mons
- Cuesmes
- Frameries
- Genly
- Quévy

== Accidents ==
In 2010, two trains collided on the line 96, near Halle train station, causing 19 deaths.
