= Quiévrain =

Municipality in Hainaut Province, Wallonia, Belgium

Quiévrain: Kievrin (Picard)
- Municipality
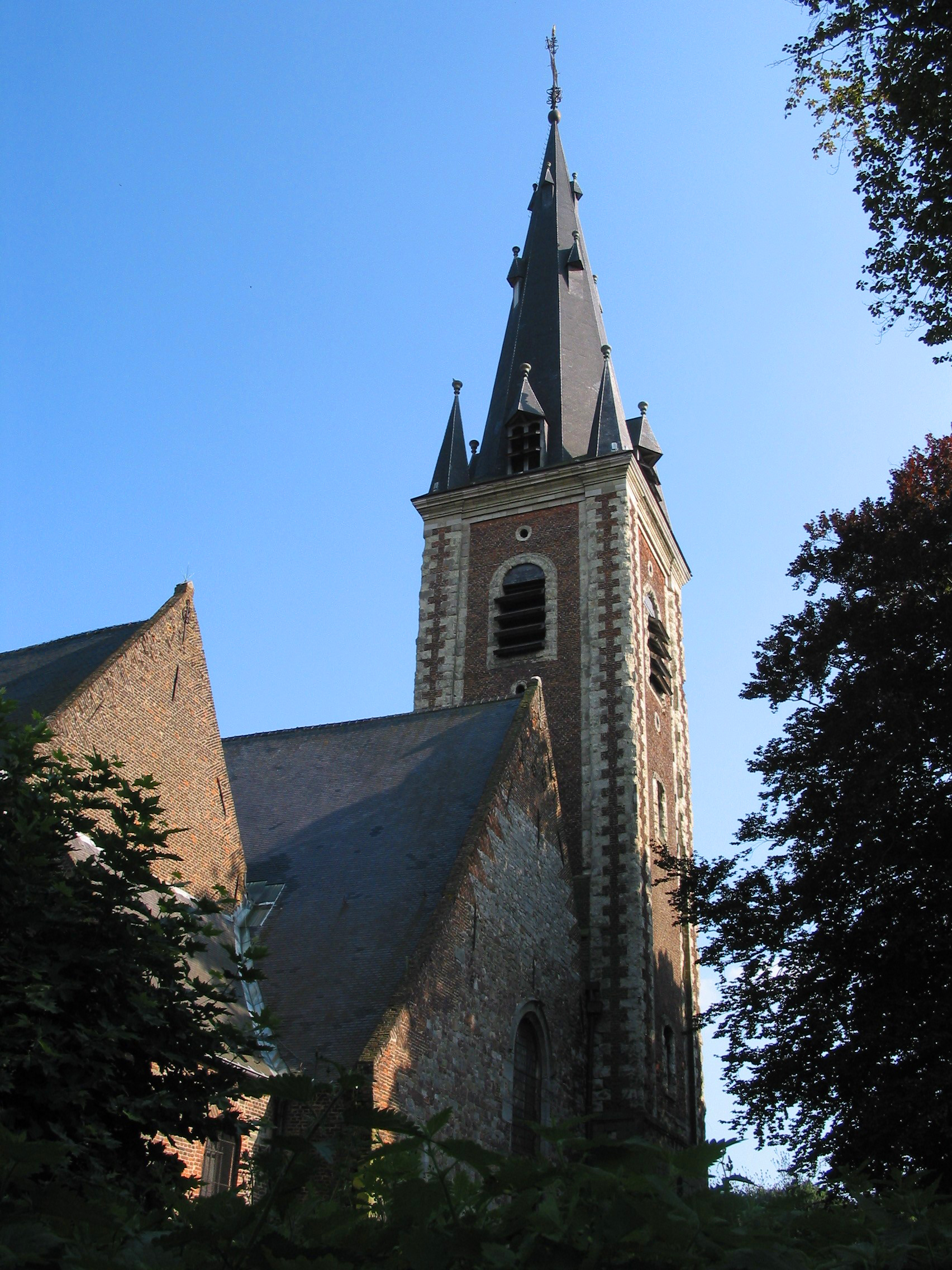
- Quiévrain: St Martin's church (16th century)

- Flag Coat of arms

- Location of Quiévrain in Hainaut
- Interactive map of Quiévrain
- Location in Belgium
- Coordinates: 50°24′N 03°41′E
- Country: Belgium
- Community: French Community
- Region: Wallonia
- Province: Hainaut
- Arrondissement: Mons

Government
  - Mayor: Véronique Damée (MR) (Changer)
  - Governing party: Changer

Area
  - Total: 21.48 km^{2} (8.29 sq mi)

Population (2018-01-01)
  - Total: 6,759
  - Density: 314.7/km^{2} (815.0/sq mi)
- Postal codes: 7380, 7382
- NIS code: 53068
- Area codes: 065
- Website: www.quievrain.be

Quiévrain (French pronunciation: [kjevʁɛ̃]; Picard: Kievrin) is a municipality of Wallonia located in the province of Hainaut, Belgium.

On 1 January 2006, the municipality had 6,559 inhabitants. The total area is 21.22 km^{2}, giving a population density of 309 inhabitants per km^{2}.

The municipality consists of the following districts: Audregnies, Baisieux, and Quiévrain.

Quiévrain is the border crossing point on the old main Paris-Brussels railway line. As a result, Belgians humorously refer to France (and vice versa) as outre-Quiévrain (beyond Quiévrain).

In the closing days of the First World War, Quiévrain was liberated by the Canadian Expeditionary Force on November 7, 1918, and marks the starting point of the Canadian Route of Remembrance in Belgium.

== Revolutions of 1848 ==
Shortly after the French Revolution of 1848, Belgian migrant workers living in Paris were encouraged to return to Belgium to overthrow the monarchy and establish a republic. Around 6,000 émigrés, coming from Paris, formed the "Belgian Legion". The legion was armed by some of the administrative authorities of Lille, and intended to penetrate into Belgium to "raise the people" and overthrow the Belgian monarchy. It is likely that the revolutionaries had the support of the Minister of Foreign Affairs of the French Second Republic, which had only recently been installed and was still very militant.

The first group, travelling by train, was stopped and quickly disarmed at Quiévrain on 26 March 1848. The second group crossed into Belgium and was defeated in the Risquons-Tout incident.
