= List of busiest railway stations in Belgium =

This is a list of the busiest railway stations in Belgium sorted by the average number of passengers boarding daily on weekdays in 2014. The province is also listed, unless the station lies within the Brussels-Capital Region and therefore does not belong to any province.

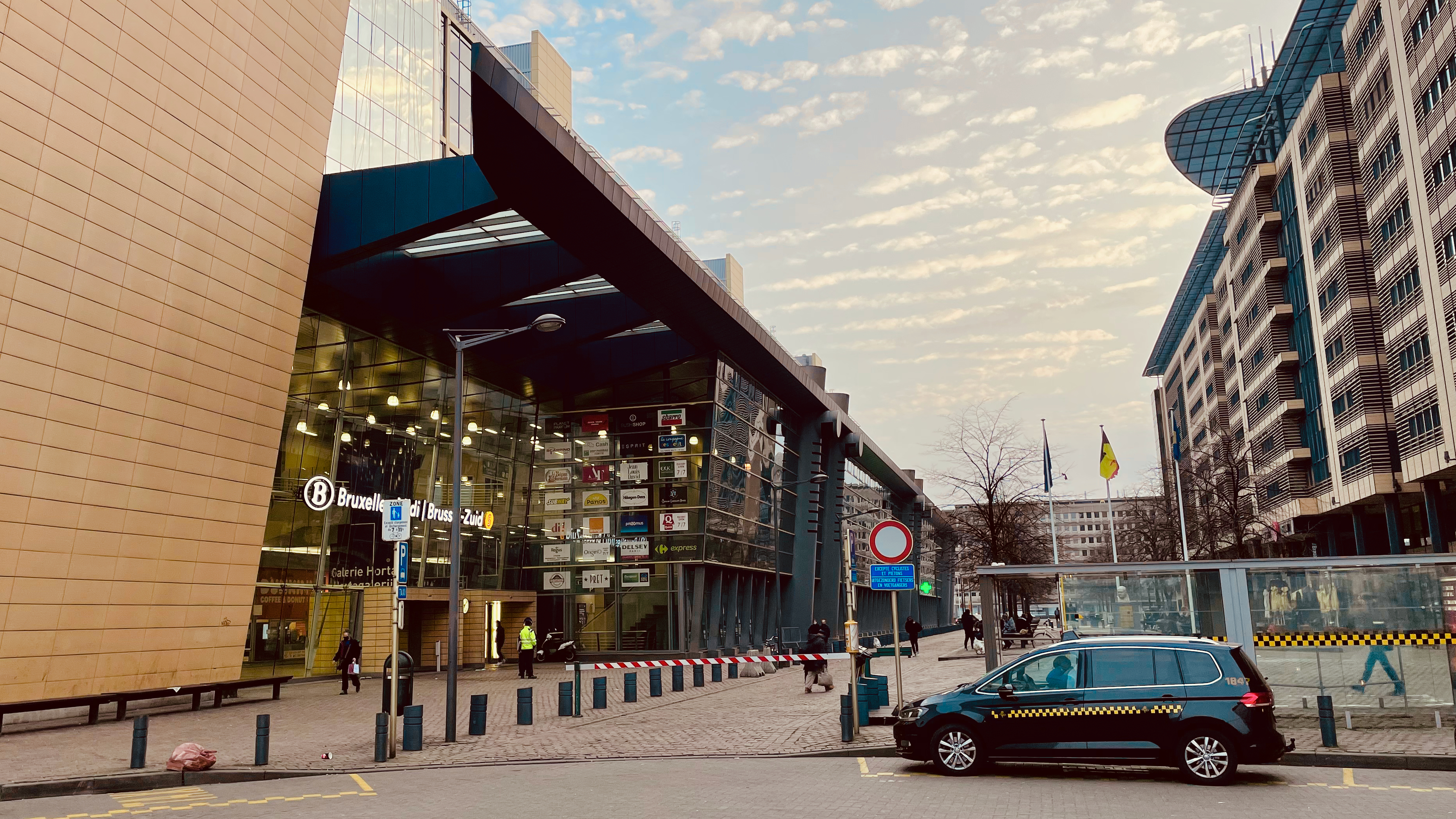
1 – Brussels-South

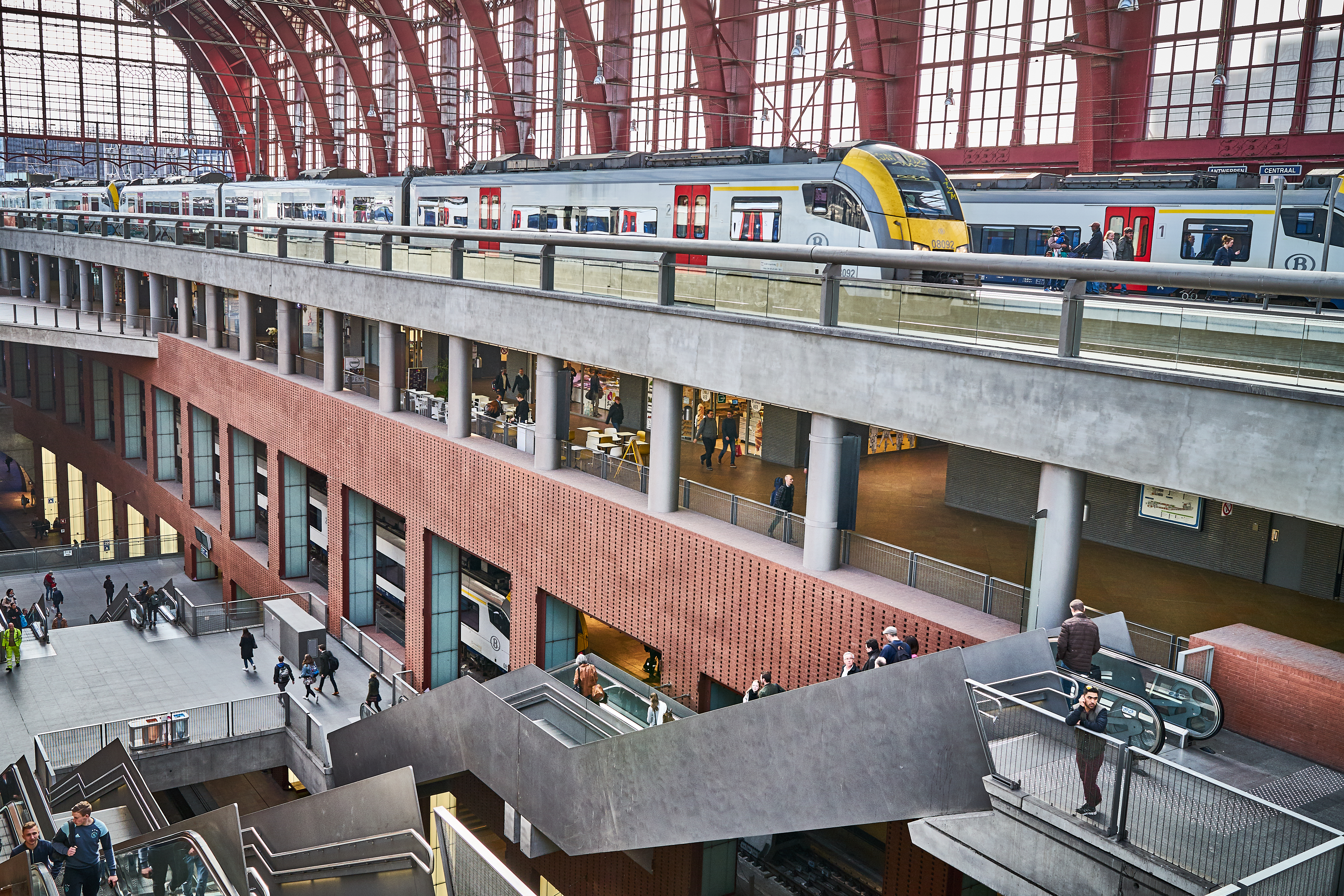
5 – Antwerpen-Centraal

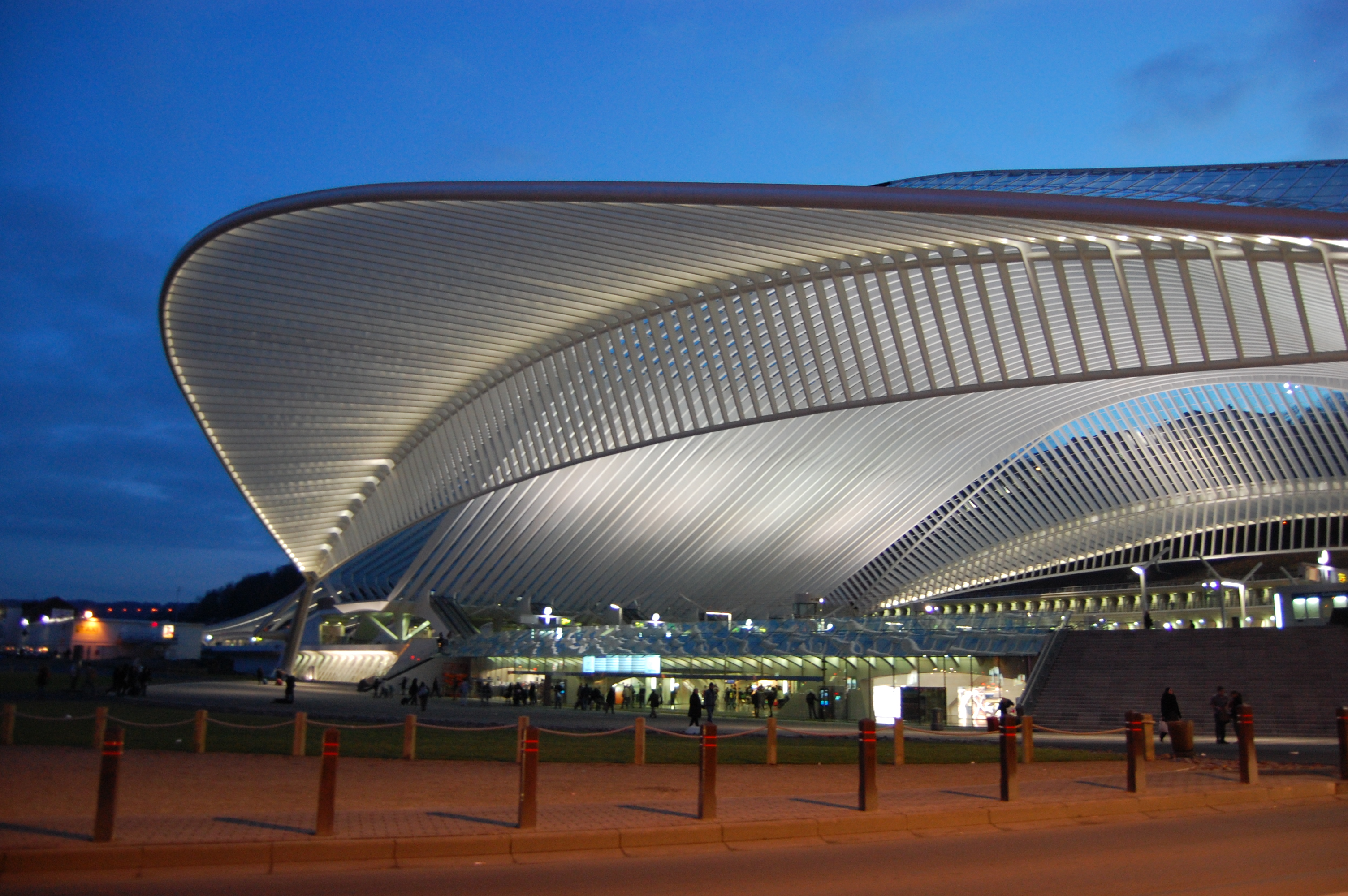
11 – Liège-Guillemins

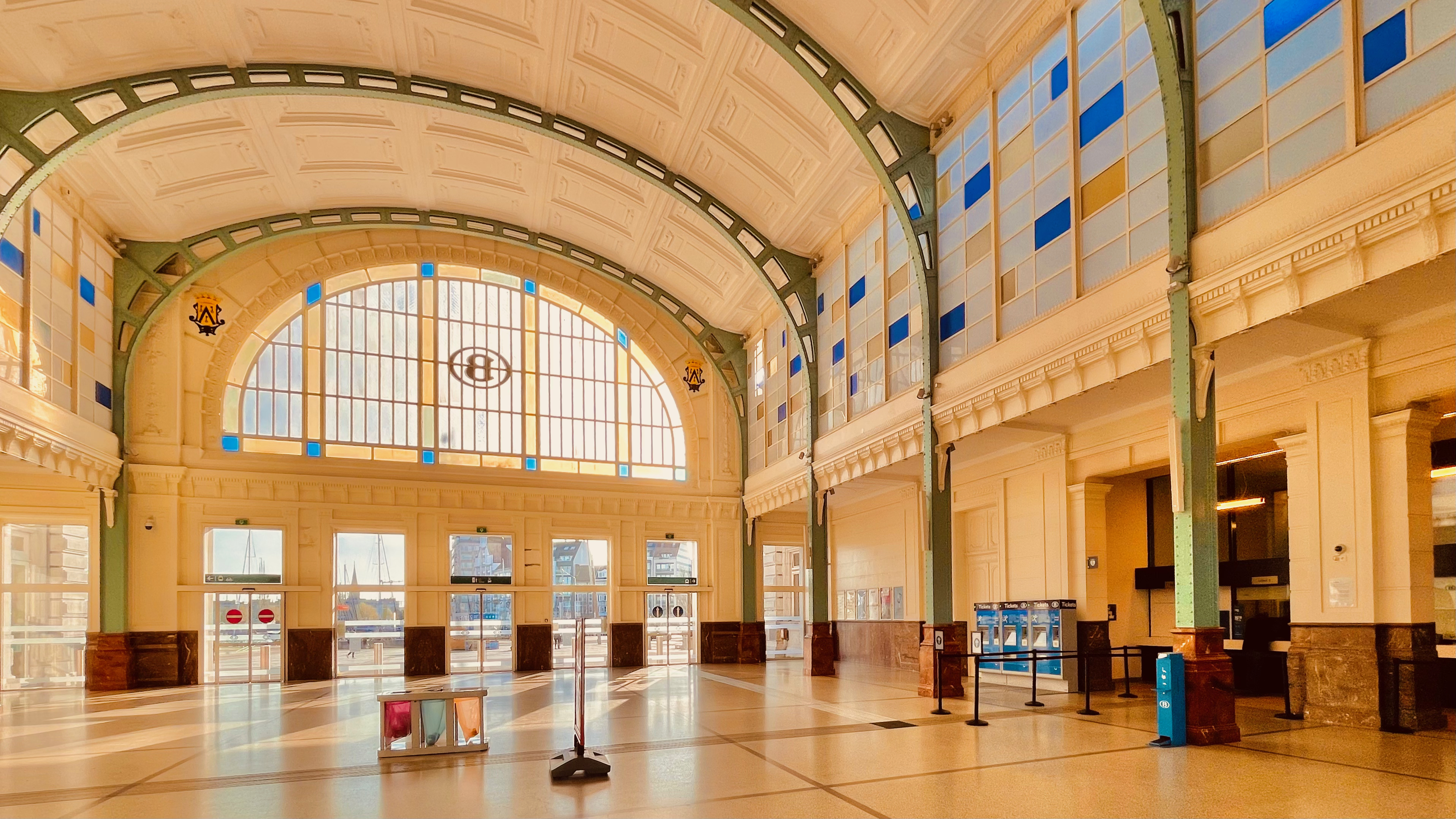
22 – Oostende

The figures include only passenger traffic on national rail services. Numbers for passengers on international trains like Eurostar and other high-speed rail services are excluded.

Rank	Station	Province	Passengers
1	Brussels-South	Brussels-Capital Region	61,941
2	Brussels-Central	Brussels-Capital Region	61,234
3	Brussels-North	Brussels-Capital Region	58,345
4	Gent-Sint-Pieters	East Flanders	54,169
5	Antwerpen-Centraal	Antwerp	34,265
6	Leuven	Flemish Brabant	32,247
7	Namur	Namur	18,704
8	Mechelen	Antwerp	18,593
9	Brugge	West Flanders	18,122
10	Ottignies	Walloon Brabant	17,753
11	Liège-Guillemins	Liège	17,467
12	Charleroi-Central	Hainaut	13,223
13	Antwerpen-Berchem	Antwerp	12,212
14	Kortrijk	West Flanders	10,061
15	Mons	Hainaut	9,434
16	Denderleeuw	East Flanders	8,748
17	Sint-Niklaas	East Flanders	7,259
18	Aalst	East Flanders	7,112
19	Tournai	Hainaut	7,001
20	Hasselt	Limburg	6,977
21	Brussels-Luxembourg	Brussels-Capital Region	6,942
22	Oostende	West Flanders	6,939
23	Gembloux	Namur	6,721
24	Louvain-La-Neuve	Walloon Brabant	6,518
25	Dendermonde	East Flanders	6,487
26	Brussels-Schuman	Brussels-Capital Region	6,441
27	Zottegem	East Flanders	5,990
28	Brussels Airport-Zaventem	Flemish Brabant	5,663
29	Vilvoorde	Flemish Brabant	5,460
30	Gent-Dampoort	East Flanders	5,231

== See also ==
- List of railway stations in Belgium
