= Berchem-Sainte-Agathe railway station =

Railway station in Brussels, Belgium

Coordinates: 50.8727°N 4.2898°E

Berchem-Sainte-Agathe Sint-Agatha-Berchem
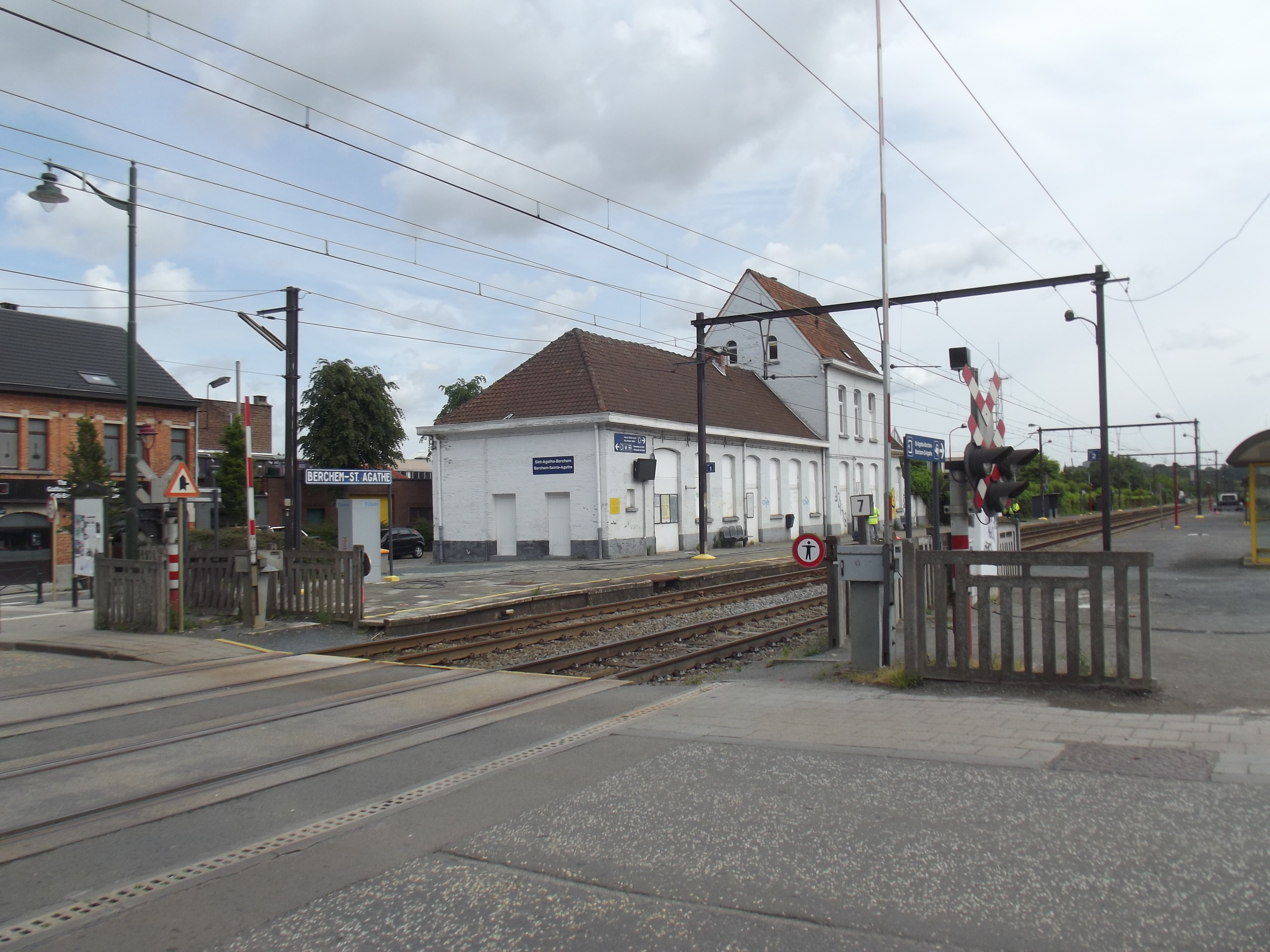
- Berchem-Sainte-Agathe/Sint-Agatha-Berchem railway station

General information
- Location: Berchem-Sainte-Agathe, Brussels-Capital Region; Belgium
- System: Railway Station
- Owner: SNCB/NMBS
- Operator: SNCB/NMBS
- Line: 50 (Brussels-Ghent)
- Platforms: 2
- Tracks: 2

Other information
- Station code: FBSG

History
- Opened: 7 August 1864; 162 years ago

Passengers
- 2014: 891
Location
- Location within Belgium Location within Europe

Berchem-Sainte-Agathe railway station (French: Gare de Berchem-Sainte-Agathe) or Sint-Agatha-Berchem railway station (Dutch: Station Sint-Agatha-Berchem) (Note: Officially Berchem-Sainte-Agathe/Sint-Agatha-Berchem (French: Berchem-Sainte-Agathe; Dutch: Sint-Agatha-Berchem)) is a railway station in the municipality of Berchem-Sainte-Agathe in Brussels, Belgium. The station, operated by the National Railway Company of Belgium (NMBS/SNCB), is located on line 50, between Jette and Groot-Bijgaarden railway stations. It can be accessed from the Place de la Gare/Stationplein next to the Chaussée de Gand/Gentsesteenweg.

The station connects with Brussels tram routes 82 and 83, as well as bus routes 84 and 87.

== Train services ==
The station is served by the following service(s):

- Brussels RER services (S4) Aalst - Denderleeuw - Brussels-Luxembourg (- Etterbeek - Merode - Vilvoorde) (weekdays)
- Brussels RER services (S10) Aalst - Denderleeuw - Brussels - Dendermonde

Preceding station	NMBS/SNCB	Following station
Groot-Bijgaarden towards Aalst	S 4 weekdays	Jette towards Mechelen
Groot-Bijgaarden towards Aalst	S 10	Jette towards Dendermonde

== See also ==
- List of railway stations in Belgium
- Rail transport in Belgium
- Transport in Brussels
- History of Brussels
