= Bockstael railway station =

Railway station in Brussels, Belgium

Coordinates: 50.8795°N 4.3484°E

Bockstael
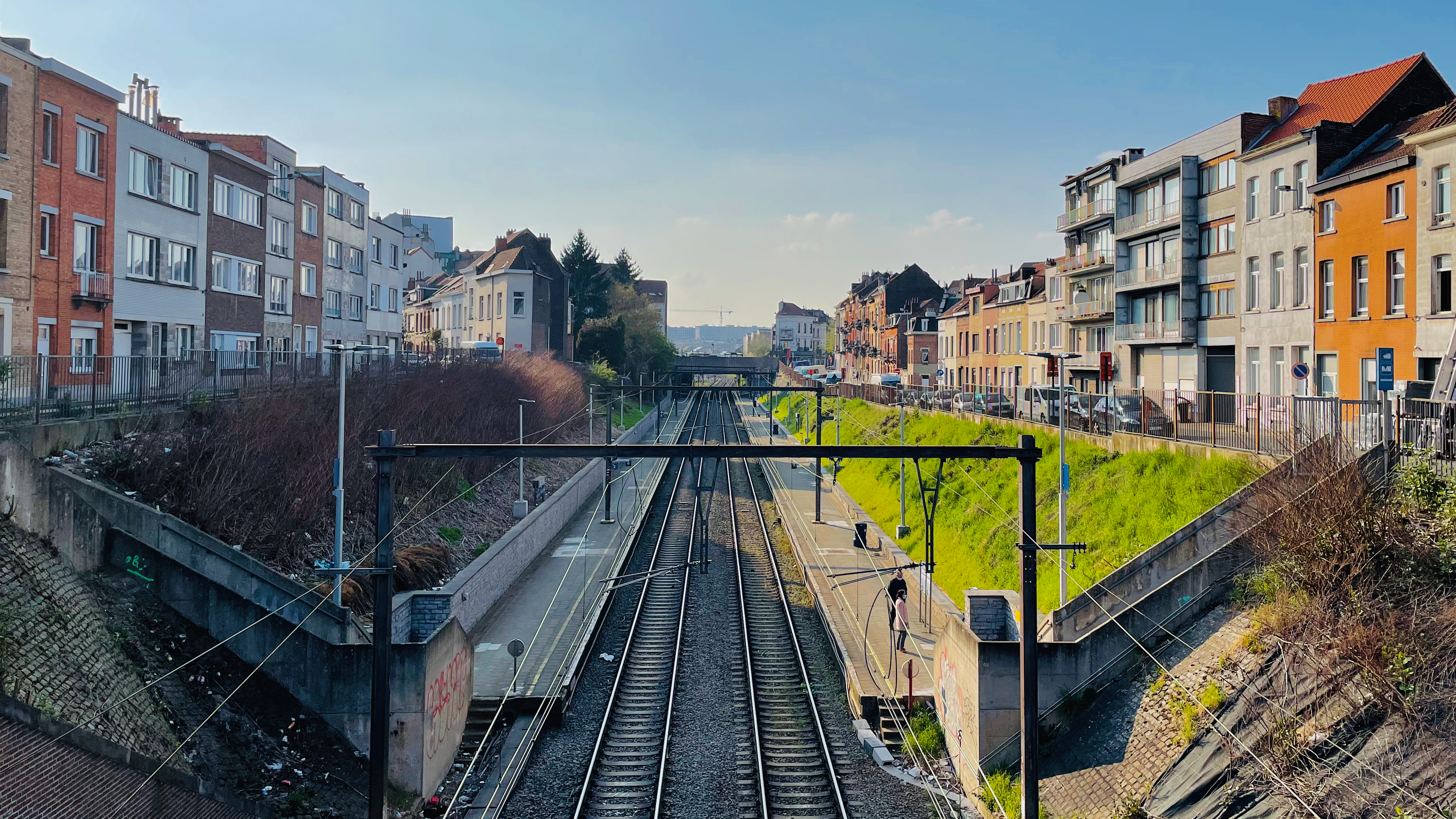
- Bockstael railway station

General information
- Location: City of Brussels, Brussels-Capital Region; Belgium
- System: Railway Station
- Owner: SNCB/NMBS
- Operator: SNCB/NMBS
- Line: 50 (Brussels-Ghent)
- Platforms: 2
- Tracks: 2

Other information
- Station code: FBL

History
- Opened: 6 October 1982; 43 years ago
Location
- Location within Belgium Location within Europe

Bockstael railway station (French: Gare de Bockstael; Dutch: Station Bockstael) (Note: Officially Bockstael) is a railway station in Brussels, Belgium, operated by the National Railway Company of Belgium (NMBS/SNCB). It opened in 1982 to replace Laeken railway station.

The station is located in the City of Brussels on line 50, between Brussels-North and Jette railway stations. It is named after the nearby Place Emile Bockstael/Emile Bockstaelplein.

== Train services ==
The station is served by the following service(s):

- Brussels RER services (S3) Dendermonde - Brussels - Denderleeuw - Zottegem - Oudenaarde (weekdays)
- Brussels RER services (S4) Aalst - Denderleeuw - Brussels-Luxembourg (- Etterbeek - Merode - Vilvoorde) (weekdays)
- Brussels RER services (S10) Dendermonde - Brussels - Denderleeuw - Aalst

Preceding station	NMBS/SNCB	Following station
Jette towards Dendermonde	S 3	Bruxelles-Nord / Brussel-Noord towards Oudenaarde
Jette towards Aalst	S 4 weekdays	Brussels-Schuman towards Mechelen
Jette towards Aalst	S 10	Bruxelles-Nord / Brussel-Noord towards Dendermonde

== Connections ==
The station offers a connection with Bockstael metro station on 6 of the Brussels Metro system, Brussels tram routes 62 and 93, as well as bus routes 49, 53, 88 and 89. Many buses of the Flemish transport company De Lijn also stop there.

== See also ==
- List of railway stations in Belgium
- Rail transport in Belgium
- Transport in Brussels
- History of Brussels
