= Tour et Taxis railway station =

Railway station in Brussels, Belgium

Tour et Taxis
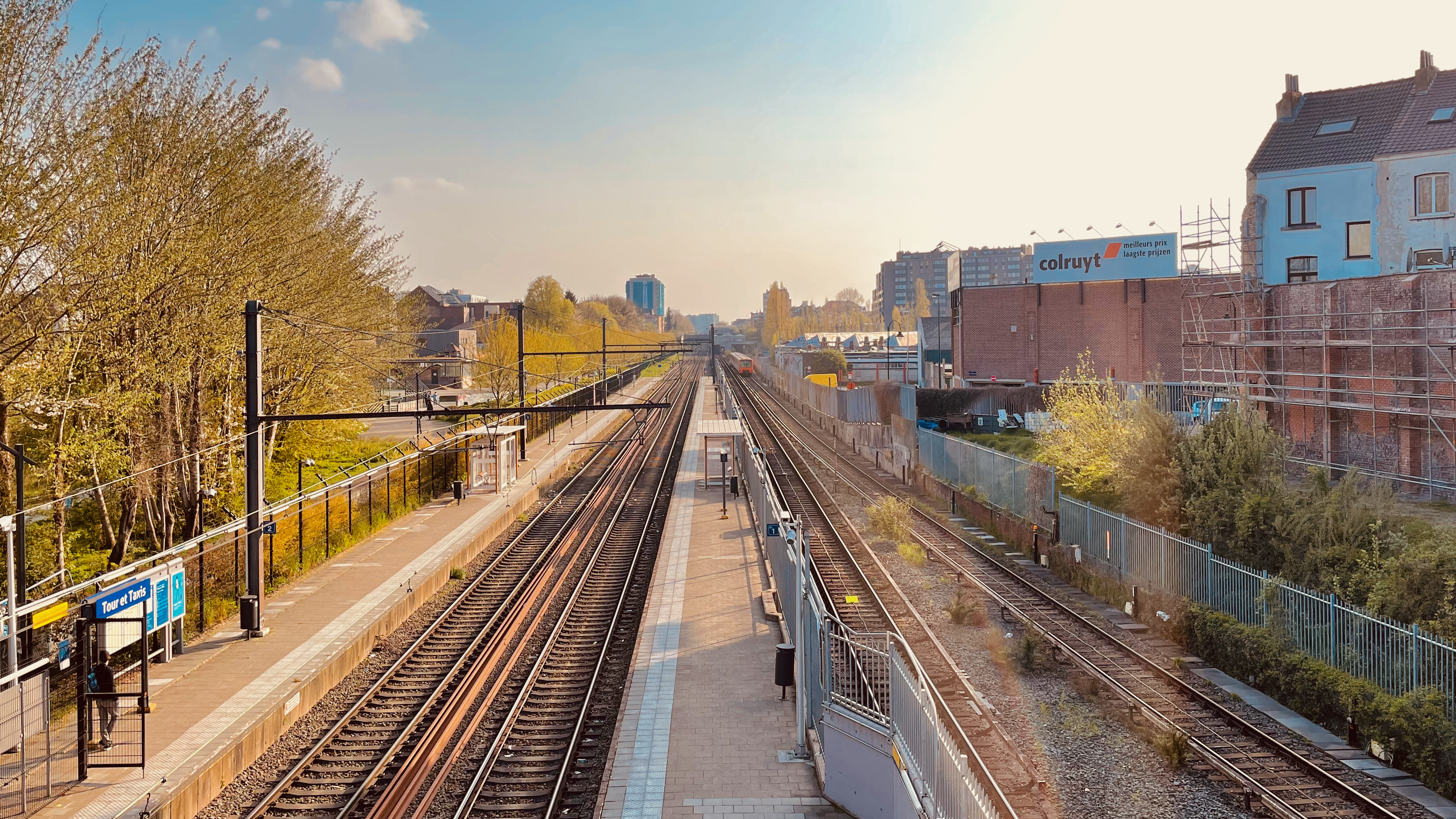
- Tour et Taxis/Thurn en Taxis railway station

General information
- Location: Laeken, Brussels-Capital Region; Belgium
- Coordinates: 50.8730°N 4.3425°E
- System: Railway Station
- Owner: SNCB/NMBS
- Operator: SNCB/NMBS

History
- Opened: 1883; 143 years ago
- Closed: 1984; 42 years ago
- Rebuilt: 2015; 11 years ago
Location
- Location within Belgium Location within Europe

Tour et Taxis railway station (French: Gare de Tour et Taxis) or Thurn en Taxis railway station (Dutch: Station Thurn en Taxis) (Note: Officially Tour et Taxis/Thurn en Taxis (French: Tour et Taxis; Dutch: Thurn en Taxis)) is a railway station in Laeken, in the north-west of the City of Brussels, Belgium, opened in 1883. The train station, located on the Rue Charles Demeer/Charles Demeerstraat, occupies the same site as Pannenhuis metro station on line 6 of the Brussels Metro. The train services are operated by the National Railway Company of Belgium (NMBS/SNCB).

== History ==
The station was opened on 1 May 1883 as Pannenhuis and later renamed to Brussels North-West. The station closed down on 3 June 1984, but reopened in 2015 as part of the Brussels Regional Express Network (RER/GEN) project under the name Tour et Taxis/Thurn en Taxis.

== Connections ==
- Metro: 6 - Pannenhuis Station

== Train services ==
- Brussels RER services (S10) Dendermonde - Brussels - Denderleeuw - Aalst

Preceding station	NMBS/SNCB	Following station
Jette toward Dendermonde	S10	Simonis toward Aalst

== See also ==
- List of railway stations in Belgium
- Rail transport in Belgium
- Transport in Brussels
- History of Brussels
- Tour & Taxis
