= Brussels-North railway station =

Railway and premetro station in Brussels, Belgium

Brussels-North
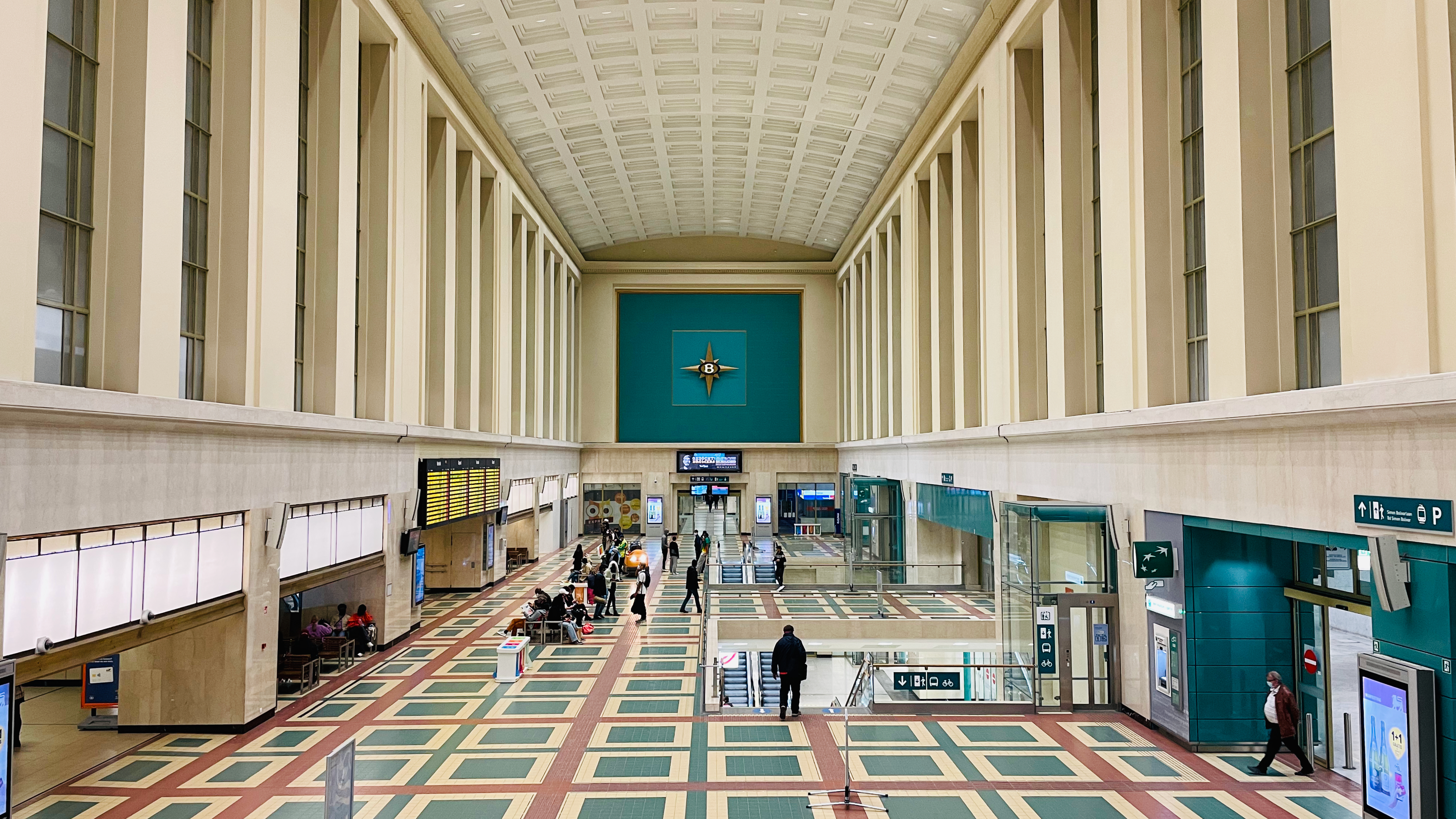
- Main hall of Brussels-North railway station

General information
- Location: Rue du Progrès / Vooruitgangstraat 76; 1030 Schaerbeek, Brussels-Capital Region; Belgium
- Coordinates: 50°51′36″N 4°21′42″E
- System: Railway Station
- Owner: SNCB/NMBS
- Operator: SNCB/NMBS
- Line: 0, 25, 27, 36, 50, 161
- Platforms: 12
- Connections: Brussels Metro: 4 10

Construction
- Architect: Jacques and Paul Saintenoy
- Architectural style: Modernism

Other information
- Station code: FBN

History
- Opened: 4 October 1952; 73 years ago
Location
- Location within Belgium Location within Europe

Brussels-North railway station (French: Gare de Bruxelles-Nord; Dutch: Station Brussel-Noord) (Note: Officially Brussels-North (French: Bruxelles-Nord; Dutch: Brussel-Noord)) is one of the three major railway stations in Brussels, Belgium; the other two are Brussels-Central and Brussels-South. Every regular domestic and international train (except Eurostar) passing there has a planned stop. The station has 200,000 passengers per week, mainly commuters, making it one of the busiest in Belgium. It is operated by the National Railway Company of Belgium (SNCB/NMBS).

Brussels-North is the end point of the premetro (underground tram) North–South Axis (on lines 4 and 10), and an important node of the Brussels Intercommunal Transport Company (STIB/MIVB), as well as of bus lines of the Flemish transport company De Lijn. More than 30 regional bus lines depart from there, as do international coach services.

The station is located in the Brussels municipality of Schaerbeek, in the middle of the Northern Quarter business district (also called Little Manhattan), with several corporation headquarters such as Proximus Towers, Rogier Tower and others, government offices, as well as Flemish ministries. Right next to the station is the Rue d'Aerschot/Aarschotstraat, an area of prostitution "behind windows".

== Naming ==
The Brussels-Capital Region is bilingual; hence, both the French and Dutch names of the station—Bruxelles-Nord and Brussel-Noord—are official. Outside Belgium, this often leads to the use of combined shorthands; for example in the Thomas Cook European Rail Timetable, Brussels-North is designated as Brussels Nord/Noord; NS (Dutch Railways) announce the station as Brussel Noord/Nord. The station's bilingual French–Dutch name is otherwise generally translated in English to Brussels-North.

== History ==
=== First and second stations (1835–1952) ===
The very first railway station in Brussels was Allée Verte/Groendreef railway station near the site of today's Yser/IJzer metro station, north of the City of Brussels. It was from there that, on 5 May 1835, the first passenger train on a public railway in continental Europe departed.

This first station was replaced in March 1846 by a new monumental station on the Place Charles Rogier/Karel Rogierplein, a short distance east from the original site, on the territory of the municipality of Saint-Josse-ten-Noode. Designed by the architect François Coppens in neoclassical style, this second "North Station" (French: Gare du Nord, Dutch: Noordstation) was a single-storey railway complex that stretched in width from the Rue d'Aerschot/Aarschotstraat to the Rue du Progrès/Vooruitgangsstraat, and in length, from the Place Rogier to the Avenue de la Reine/Koninginnelaan (nowadays a tunnel). To connect the neighbourhoods on both sides of the railway, there were only two pedestrian bridges: one at the Place Rogier and the other at the Rue Dupont/Dupontstraat. It consisted of 27 tracks.

The Belgian railway network grew rapidly during the second half of the 19th century, becoming the densest in continental Europe. By then, Brussels-North and Brussels-South had become the primary railway stations in Brussels. However, they were joined only by an inadequate single track running along what is today the Small Ring (Brussels' inner ring road). Many proposals were put forward to link the two stations more substantially. A law was finally passed in 1909 mandating a direct connection; however, the final project would not be completed until nearly half a century later.

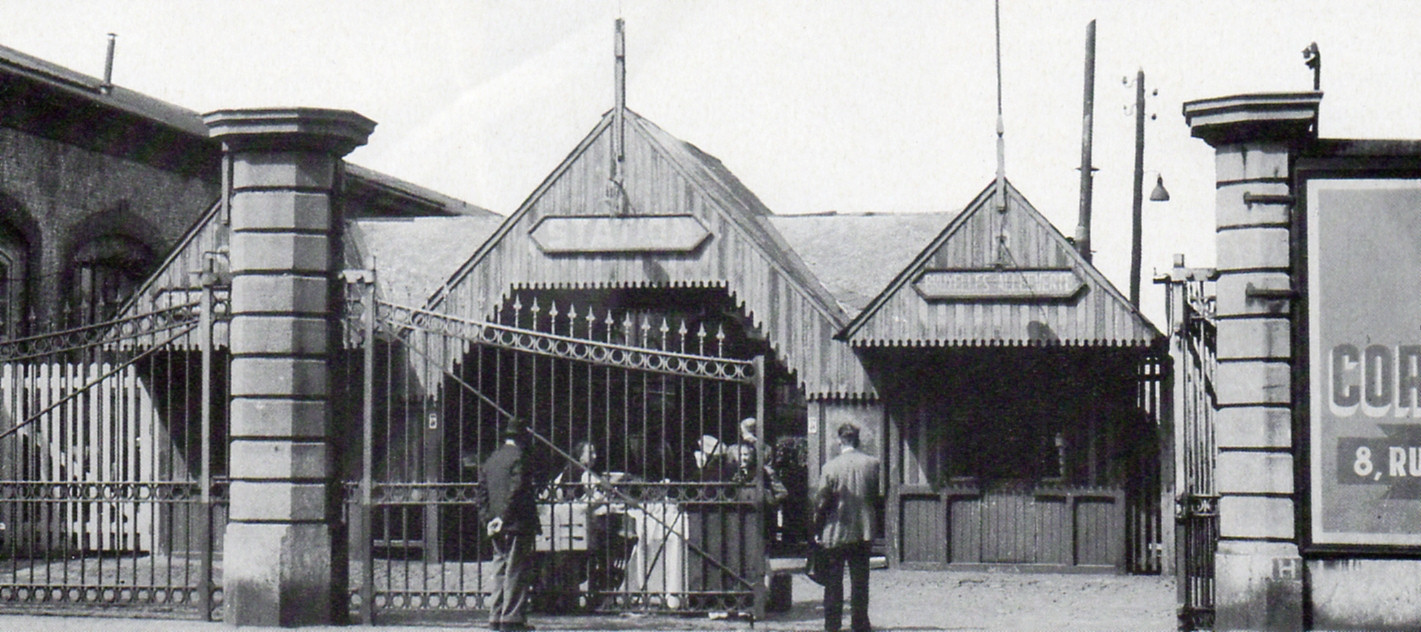
Allée Verte/Groendreef railway station (1835), pictured in the early 20th century

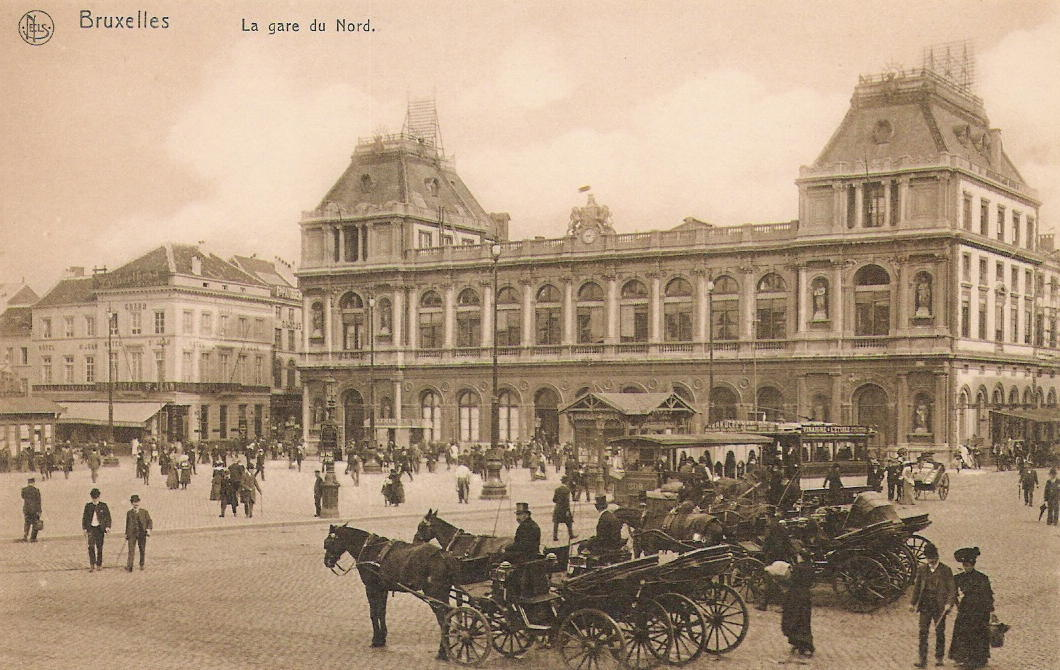
The second station on the Place Charles Rogier/Karel Rogierplein (1846), pictured c. 1910

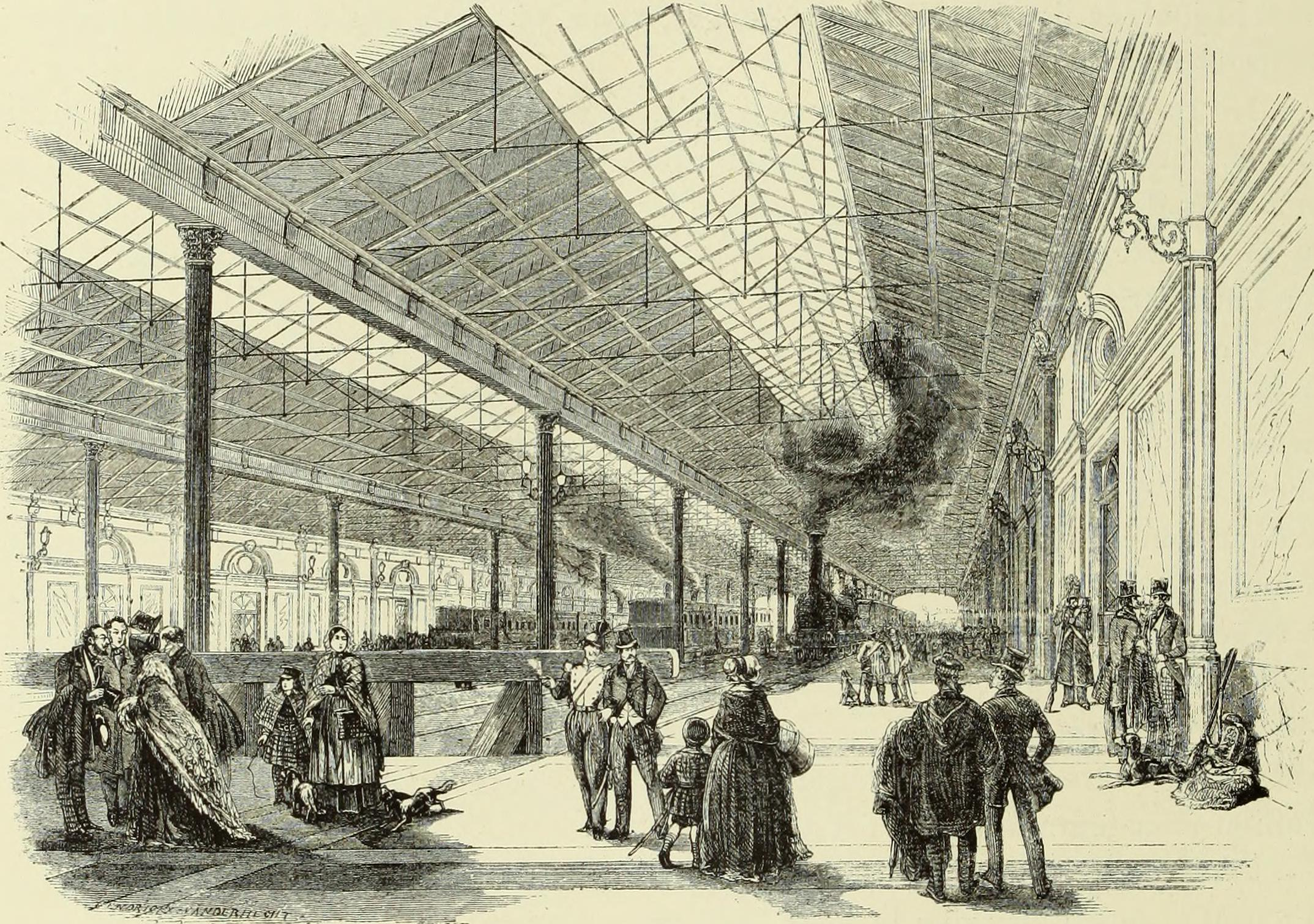
The second station's interior, c. 1884

=== Current station (1952–present) ===
A new transit station, located a few hundred metres further north, was built in 1952. It was designed in post-war modernist style by architects Jacques and Paul Saintenoy, assisted by Jean Hendrickx Vanden Bosch. The construction of the North–South connection between 1910 and 1953 ensured a train connection between the new station and the South Station. During the construction of the North–South connection, the tracks were raised and several underpasses were added. The old station on the Place Rogier was razed in 1955. A bus station was built on its former site, and then in 1960, the Rogier International Centre, also called the Martini Tower, which was formerly the tallest building in Belgium, and which housed the National Theatre of Belgium until 1999. The building was demolished in 2001, and was replaced by the 137-metre-tall (449 ft) Rogier Tower. A group of statues from the station's former façade were reconstructed at the Warandepark in Diest, Flemish Brabant, Belgium.

An extensive public transport complex, the North Communication Center (or CCN), was built on the western side of the North Station in the 1970s. As a result, the station building (on the side of the Boulevard Simon Bolivar/Simon Bolivarlaan) is now part of this larger complex. The CCN connects the bus stop of De Lijn and STIB/MIVB, as well as the premetro, with the railway station. In 1992, the Brussels-Capital Region decided to erect an Art Deco-inspired office building for its officials above the CCN. Due to the construction of this CCN and the large volume of the office building above it, the architectural appearance of the North Station with its iconic clock tower was diminished.

Renovation works started in May 2010. The ticket hall was the first to be renovated and completed in 2012. The renovation works have been systematically continued since then. The intention is, among other things, to install new escalators and lifts and for the Rue d'Aerschot to have a fully-fledged entrance. Unlike the South Station, which was largely remodelled for the arrival of international express trains, the North Station has kept most of its post-war materials and decorative elements, highlighted during this recent renovation. The station has also kept its original clock tower.

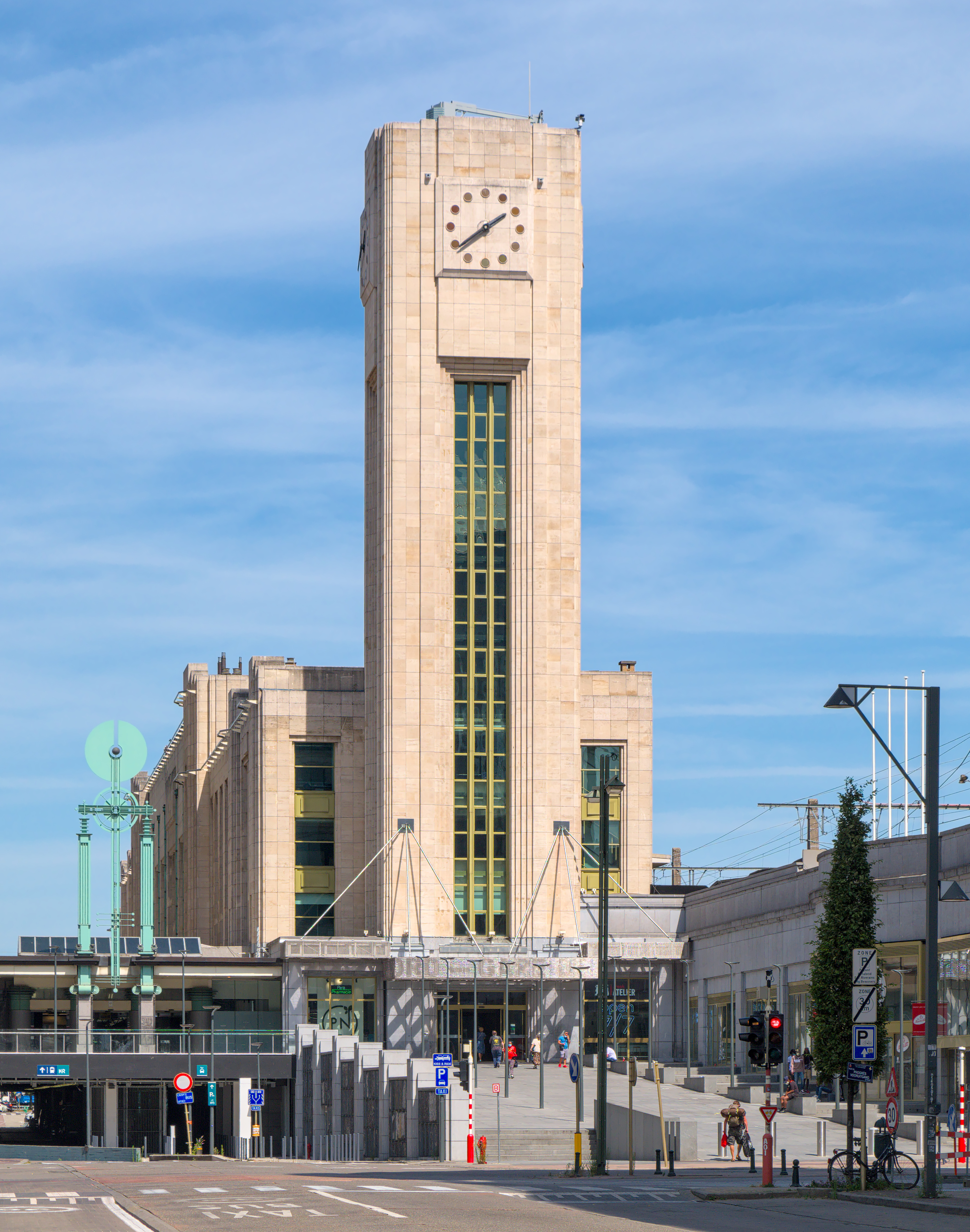
The third (current) Brussels-North station's entrance and clock tower by Paul Saintenoy (1952–1956)

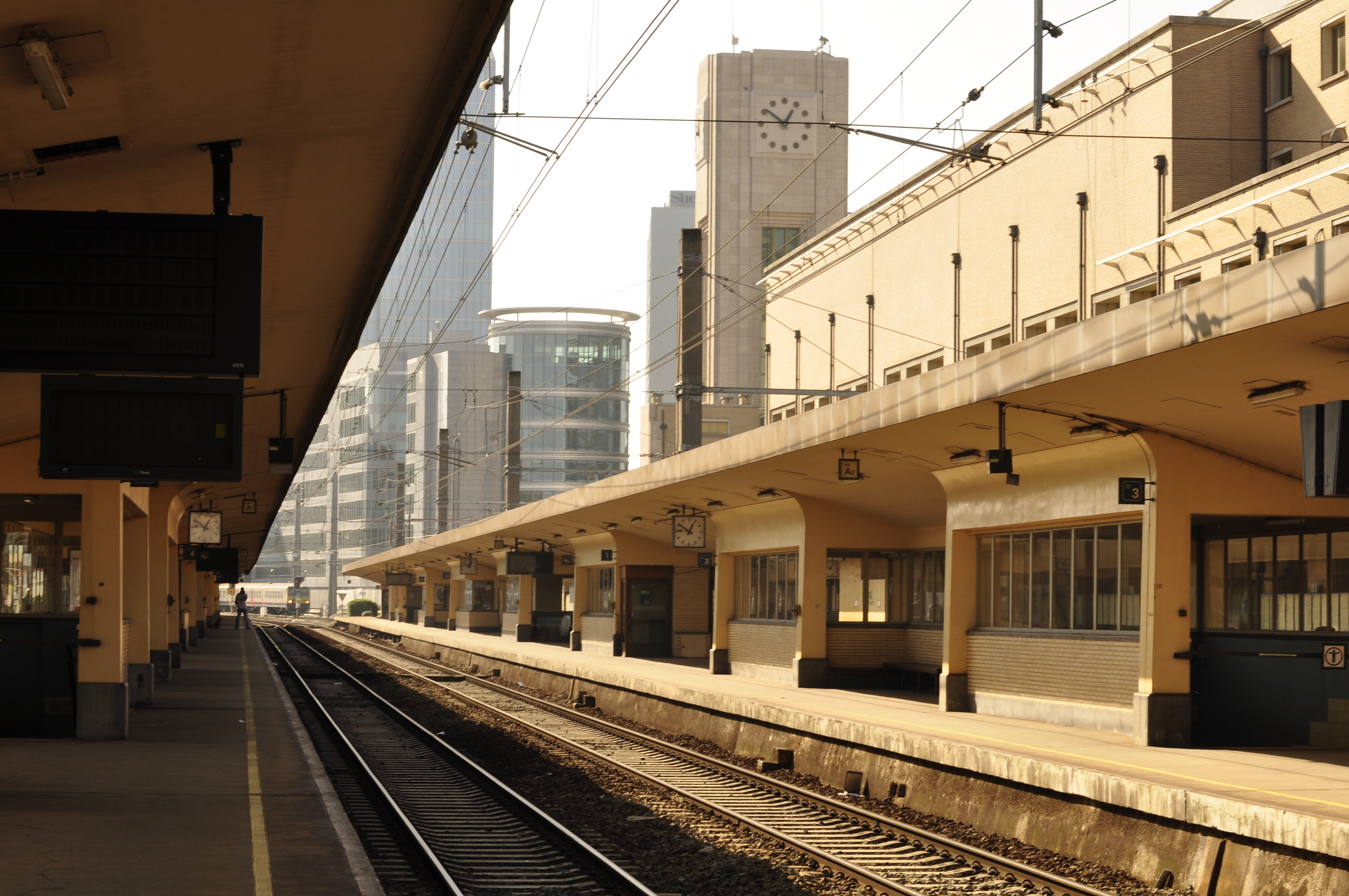
View of the North Station's tracks. The clocktower can be seen in the background.

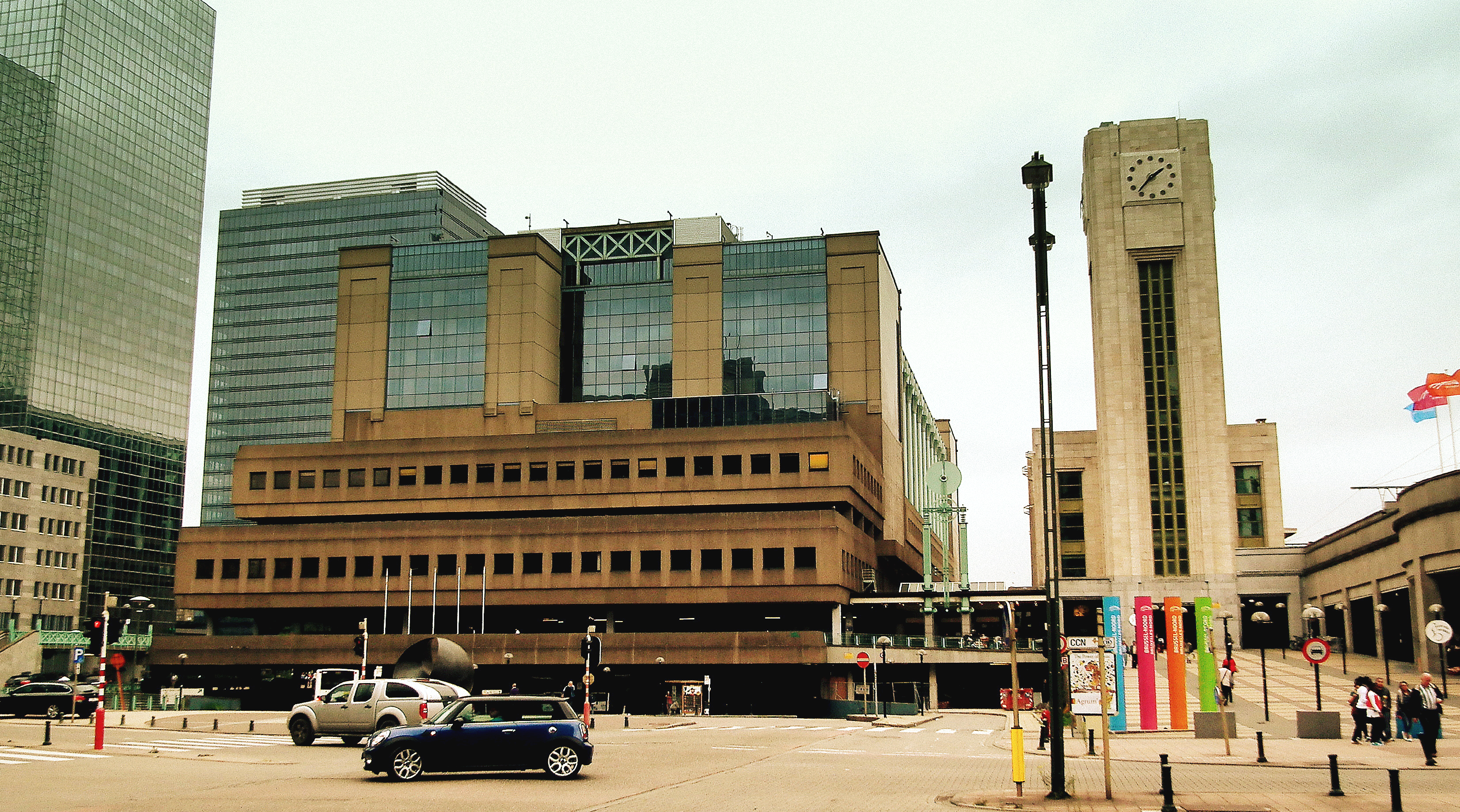
The CCN building (on the left) and entrance to the North Station

== Rail lines ==
Brussels-North has 12 platforms. These passenger lines join in the station:

- Line 0, the Brussels North-South connection
- Line 25 and 27 to Antwerp Central station
- Line 36 to Liège-Guillemins
- Line 50 to Gent-Sint-Pieters
- Line 161 to Namur

Few trains originate from Brussels-North. Instead, most trains through Brussels depart from Brussels-South, some from Schaarbeek.

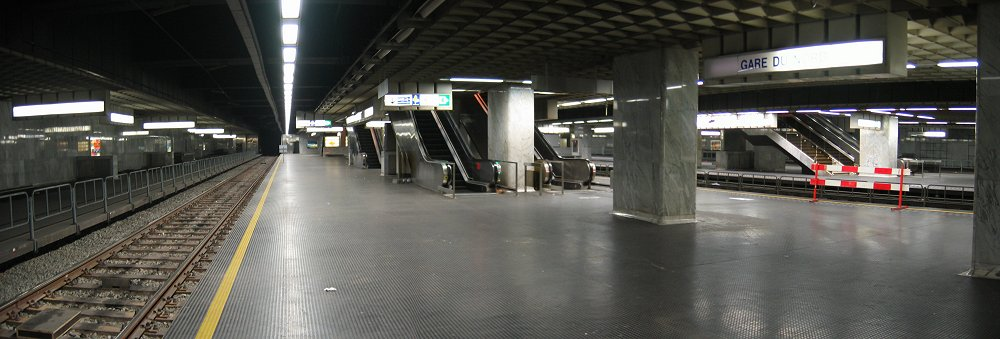
A panorama of Gare du Nord/Noordstation premetro station, the platform for northbound trains to the left, southbound on the far right

== Train services ==
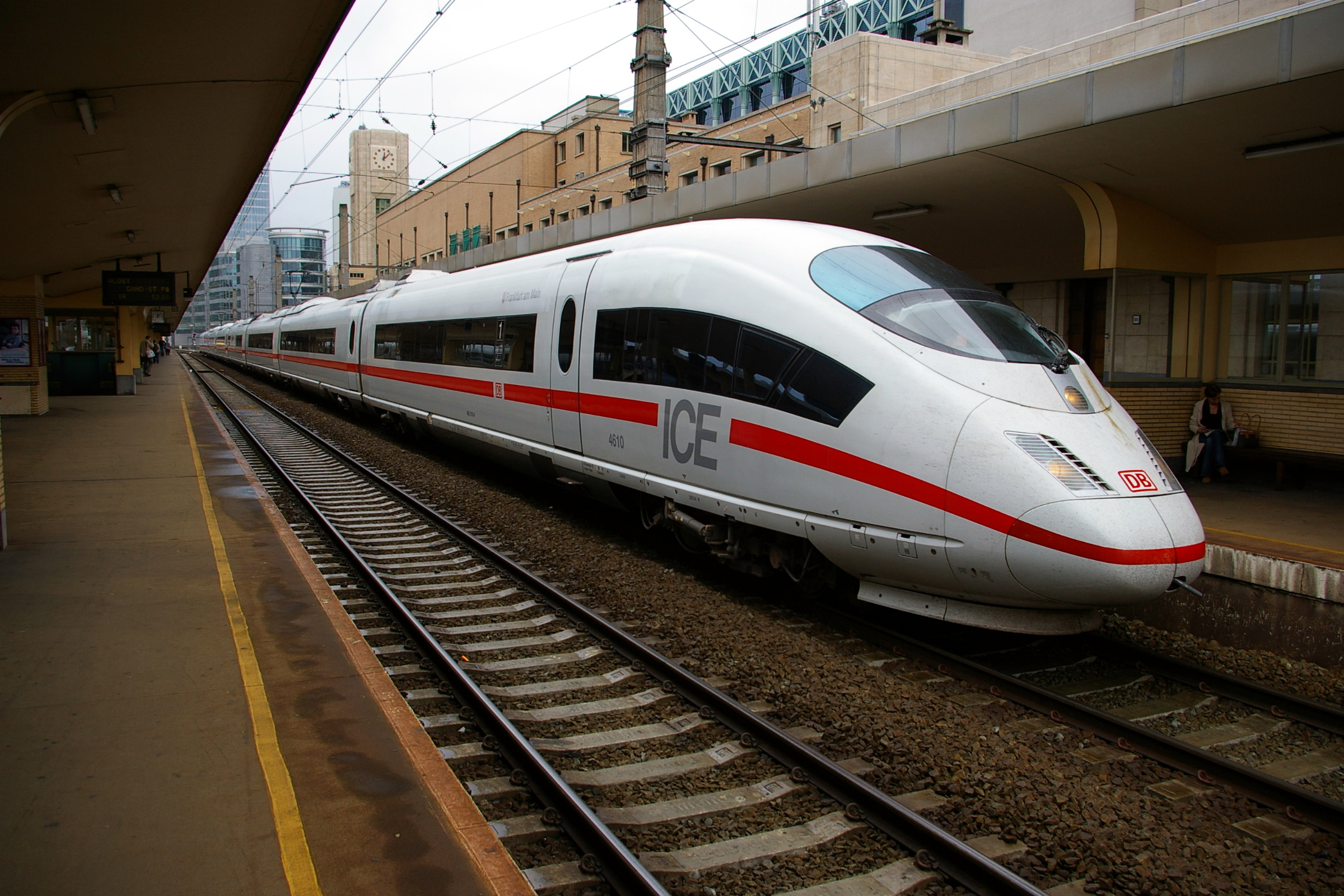
ICE train at Brussels-North railway station

The station is served by the following services:

- High speed services (ICE) Brussels - Liege - Cologne - Frankfurt
- Intercity services (IC-35) Amsterdam - The Hague - Rotterdam - Roosendaal - Antwerp - Brussels Airport - Brussels
- Intercity services (IC-16) Brussels - Namur - Arlon - Luxembourg
- Intercity services (IC-01) Ostend - Bruges - Gent - Brussels - Leuven - Liege - Welkenraedt - Eupen
- Intercity services (IC-03) Knokke/Blankenberge - Bruges - Gent - Brussels - Leuven - Hasselt - Genk
- Intercity services (IC-05) Antwerp - Mechelen - Brussels - Nivelles - Charleroi (weekdays)
- Intercity services (IC-06) Tournai - Ath - Halle - Brussels - Brussels Airport
- Intercity services (IC-06A) Mons - Braine-le-Comte - Brussels - Brussels Airport
- Intercity services (IC-11) Binche - Braine-le-Comte - Halle - Brussels - Mechelen - Turnhout (weekdays)
- Intercity services (IC-12) Kortrijk - Gent - Brussels - Leuven - Liege - Welkenraedt (weekdays)
- Intercity services (IC-14) Quiévrain - Mons - Braine-le-Comte - Brussels - Leuven - Liege (weekdays)
- Intercity services (IC-17) Brussels - Namur - Dinant (weekends)
- Intercity services (IC-18) Brussels - Namur - Liege (weekdays)
- Intercity services (IC-20) Gent - Aalst - Brussels - Hasselt - Tongeren (weekdays)
- Intercity services (IC-20) Gent - Aalst - Brussels - Dendermonde - Lokeren (weekends)
- Intercity services (IC-22) Essen - Antwerp - Mechelen - Brussels (weekdays)
- Intercity services (IC-22) Antwerp - Mechelen - Brussels - Halle - Braine-le-Comte - Binche (weekends)
- Intercity services (IC-23) Ostend - Bruges - Kortrijk - Zottegem - Brussels - Brussels Airport
- Intercity services (IC-23A) Bruges - Gent - Brussels - Brussels Airport (weekdays)
- Intercity services (IC-23A) Gent - Brussels - Brussels Airport (weekends)
- Intercity services (IC-26) Kortrijk - Tournai - Halle - Brussels - Dendermonde - Lokeren - Sint Niklaas (weekdays)
- Intercity services (IC-29) De Panne - Gent - Aalst - Brussels - Brussels Airport - Leuven - Landen
- Intercity services (IC-31) Antwerp - Mechelen - Brussels (weekdays)
- Intercity services (IC-31) Antwerp - Mechelen - Brussels - Nivelles - Charleroi (weekends)
- Brussels RER services (S1) Antwerp - Mechelen - Brussels - Waterloo - Nivelles (weekdays)
- Brussels RER services (S1) Antwerp - Mechelen - Brussels (weekends)
- Brussels RER services (S1) Brussels - Waterloo - Nivelles (weekends)
- Brussels RER services (S2) Leuven - Brussels - Halle - Braine-le-Comte
- Brussels RER services (S3) Dendermonde - Brussels - Denderleeuw - Zottegem - Oudenaarde (weekdays)
- Brussels RER services (S6) Aalst - Denderleeuw - Geraardsbergen - Halle - Brussels - Schaarbeek
- Brussels RER services (S8) Brussels - Etterbeek - Ottignies - Louvain-le-Neuve
- Brussels RER services (S10) Dendermonde - Brussels - Denderleeuw - Aalst

Preceding station	NS International	Following station
Brussels National Airport towards Amsterdam Centraal	Eurocity 9200	Brussels-Central towards Brussels-South
Preceding station	DB Fernverkehr	Following station
Brussels-South Terminus	ICE 79	Liège-Guillemins towards Frankfurt (Main) Hbf
Preceding station	NMBS/SNCB	Following station
Brussels-Central towards Oostende	IC 01	Leuven towards Eupen
Brussels-Central towards Blankenberge or Knokke	IC 03	Leuven towards Genk
Mechelen towards Antwerpen-Centraal	IC 05 weekdays	Brussels-Central towards Charleroi-Sud
Brussels-Central towards Tournai	IC 06	Diegem towards Brussels National Airport
Brussels-Central towards Mons	IC 06A	Brussels National Airport Terminus
Brussels-Central towards Binche	IC 11 weekdays	Vilvoorde towards Turnhout
Brussels-Central towards Kortrijk	IC 12 weekdays	Leuven towards Welkenraedt
Brussels-Central towards Quiévrain	IC 14 weekdays	Leuven towards Liège-Guillemins
Brussels-Central towards Bruxelles-Midi / Brussel-Zuid	IC 16	Brussels-Schuman towards Luxembourg
Brussels-Central towards Bruxelles-Midi / Brussel-Zuid	IC 17 weekends	Brussels-Schuman towards Dinant
Brussels-Central towards Bruxelles-Midi / Brussel-Zuid	IC 18 weekdays	Brussels-Schuman towards Liège-Saint-Lambert
Brussels-Central towards Gent-Sint-Pieters	IC 20 weekdays, except holidays	Aarschot towards Tongeren
Brussels-Central towards Gent-Sint-Pieters	IC 20 weekends	Jette towards Lokeren
Vilvoorde towards Essen	IC 22 weekdays, except holidays	Brussels-Central towards Bruxelles-Midi / Brussel-Zuid
Vilvoorde towards Antwerpen-Centraal	IC 22 weekends	Brussels-Central towards Binche
Brussels-Central towards Oostende	IC 23	Brussels National Airport Terminus
Brussels-Central towards Brugge	IC 23A	Brussels National Airport Terminus
Brussels-Central towards Kortrijk	IC 26 weekdays	Jette towards Sint-Niklaas
Brussels-Central towards De Panne	IC 29	Brussels National Airport towards Landen
Vilvoorde towards Antwerpen-Centraal	IC 31 weekdays, except holidays	Brussels-Central towards Bruxelles-Midi / Brussel-Zuid
Vilvoorde towards Antwerpen-Centraal	IC 31 weekends	Brussels-Central towards Charleroi-Sud
Schaarbeek towards Antwerpen-Centraal	S 1 weekdays	Brussels-Congress towards Nivelles
Terminus	S 1 weekends	Brussels-Congress towards Nivelles
Schaarbeek towards Antwerpen-Centraal	S 1 weekends	Brussels-Central towards Bruxelles-Midi / Brussel-Zuid
Schaarbeek towards Leuven	S 2	Brussels-Central towards Braine-le-Comte
Bockstael towards Dendermonde	S 3 weekdays	Brussels-Central towards Oudenaarde
Schaarbeek Terminus	S 6	Brussels-Central towards Aalst
Brussels-Schuman towards Louvain-la-Neuve	S 8	Brussels-Central towards Bruxelles-Midi / Brussel-Zuid
Bockstael towards Aalst	S 10	Brussels-Central towards Dendermonde

== See also ==
- List of railway stations in Belgium
- Rail transport in Belgium
- Transport in Brussels
- Art Deco in Brussels
- History of Brussels
