= Jette railway station =

Railway station in Brussels, Belgium

Jette
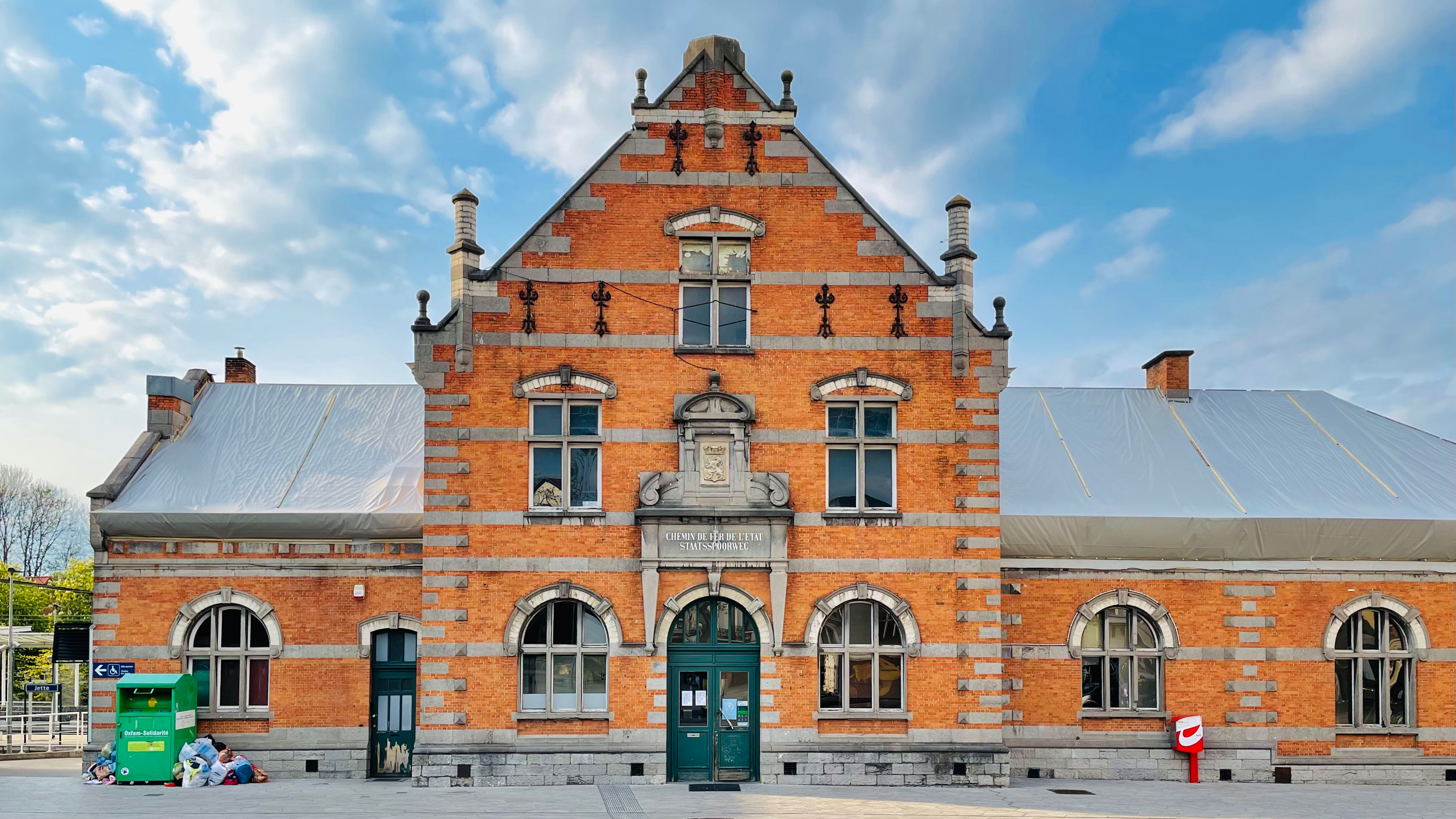
- Jette railway station

General information
- Location: Jette, Brussels-Capital Region; Belgium
- Coordinates: 50.8808°N 4.3286°E
- System: Railway Station
- Owner: SNCB/NMBS
- Operator: SNCB/NMBS
- Line: 50 (Brussels-Ghent)
- Connections: Tram 19; Bus 53; Bus 88

History
- Opened: 17 September 1858
Location
- Location within Belgium Location within Europe

Jette railway station (French: Gare de Jette; Dutch: Station Jette) (Note: Officially Jette) is a railway station in the municipality of Jette in Brussels, Belgium, opened in 1892. The station, operated by the National Railway Company of Belgium (NMBS/SNCB), is located south of King Baudouin Park on the Place Cardinal Mercier/Kardinaal Mercierplein. It lies on line 50, between Bockstael and Berchem-Sainte-Agathe railway stations.

Nearby is the Gare de Jette/Jette Station stop of the Brussels Intercommunal Transport Company (STIB/MIVB), which offers a connection with Brussels tram route 19, as well as bus routes 53 and 88.

== History ==
The station opened on 17 September 1858. The current building, whose facade is protected, dates from 1892.

== Train services ==
The station is served by the following service(s):

- Intercity services (IC-20) Lokeren - Dendermonde - Brussels - Aalst - Ghent (weekends)
- Intercity services (IC-26) Sint-Niklaas - Lokeren - Dendermonde - Brussels - Halle - Tournai - Kortrijk (weekdays)
- Brussels RER services (S3) Dendermonde - Brussels - Denderleeuw - Zottegem - Oudenaarde (weekdays)
- Brussels RER services (S4) Aalst - Denderleeuw - Brussels-Luxembourg (- Etterbeek - Merode - Vilvoorde) (weekdays)
- Brussels RER services (S10) Dendermonde - Brussels - Denderleeuw - Aalst

Preceding station	NMBS/SNCB	Following station
Dendermonde towards Lokeren	IC 20 weekends	Bruxelles-Nord / Brussel-Noord towards Gent-Sint-Pieters
Dendermonde towards Sint-Niklaas	IC 26 weekdays	Bruxelles-Nord / Brussel-Noord towards Kortrijk
Zellik towards Dendermonde	S 3	Bockstael towards Oudenaarde
Berchem-Sainte-Agathe towards Aalst	S 4 weekdays	Bockstael towards Mechelen
Zellik towards Dendermonde	S 10	Thurn en Taxis towards Aalst
Berchem-Sainte-Agathe towards Aalst	S 10	Bockstael towards Dendermonde

== See also ==
- List of railway stations in Belgium
- Rail transport in Belgium
- Transport in Brussels
- History of Brussels
