= Schaerbeek railway station =

Railway station in Brussels, Belgium

Schaerbeek Schaarbeek
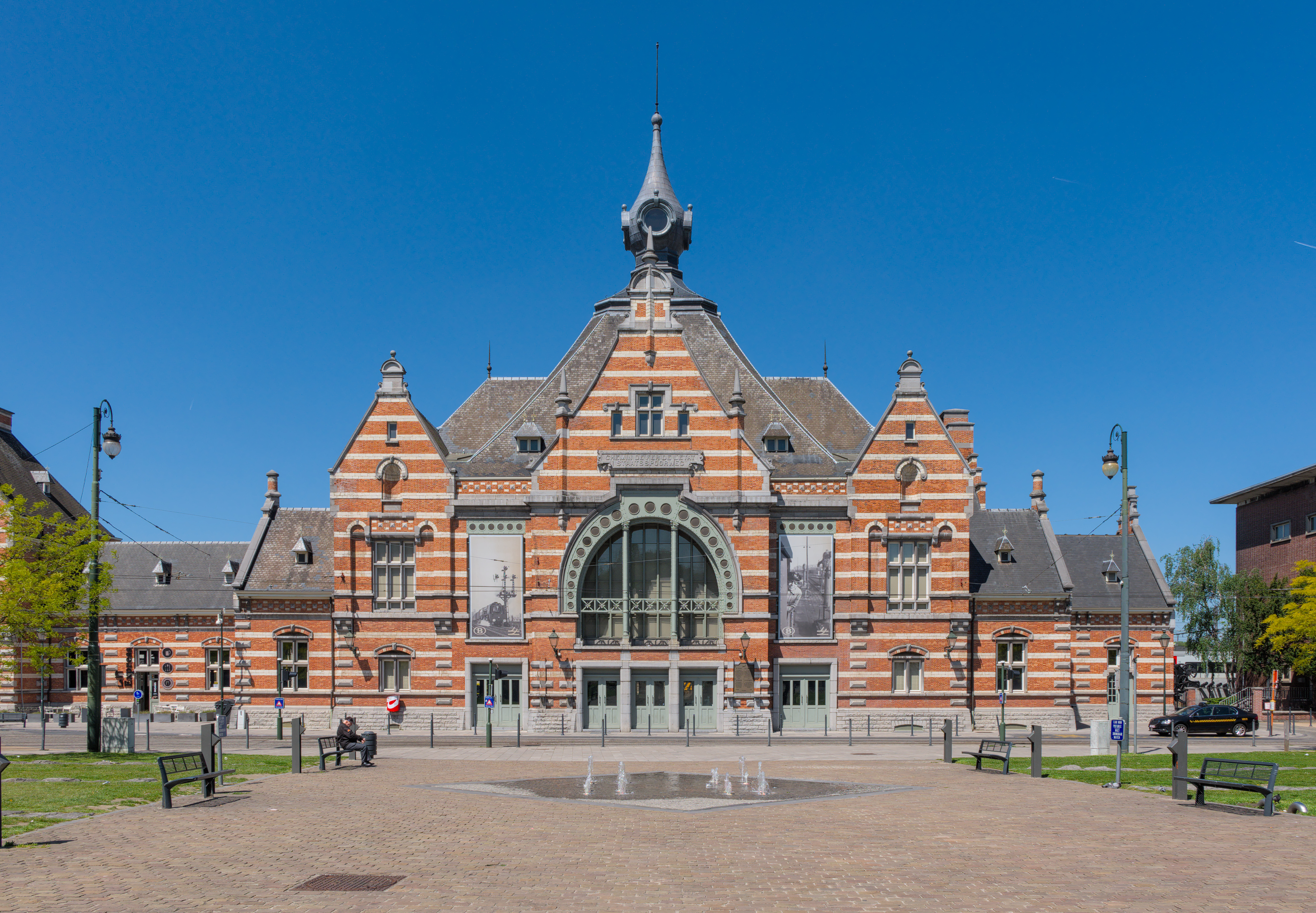
- Schaerbeek/Schaarbeek railway station

General information
- Location: Place Princesse Elisabeth / Prinses Elisabethplein; 1030 Schaerbeek, Brussels-Capital Region; Belgium
- Coordinates: 50°52′41″N 4°22′46″E
- System: Railway Station
- Owner: SNCB/NMBS
- Operator: SNCB/NMBS
- Lines: 25, 27, 28, 36, 161
- Platforms: 13

Other information
- Station code: SCHA

History
- Opened: 1887; 139 years ago
Location
- Location within Belgium Location within Europe

Schaerbeek railway station (French: Gare de Schaerbeek) or Schaarbeek railway station (Dutch: Station Schaarbeek) (Note: Officially Schaerbeek/Schaarbeek (French: Schaerbeek; Dutch: Schaarbeek)) is a railway station in the municipality of Schaerbeek in Brussels, Belgium, opened in 1887. The train services are operated by the National Railway Company of Belgium (NMBS/SNCB).

Located to the north-east of Brussels, the station mainly serves trains travelling between central Brussels and Leuven, Antwerp or Brussels Airport-Zaventem. On these routes, it is the first station trains pass through after the North–South connection (Brussels-North, Brussels-Central and Brussels-South stations). Although only local trains stop at Schaerbeek, the station also serves as a terminus for a number of interregional and peak-hour services. As it connects both to the North–South connection and to line 28 through Brussels-West station, it is the point at which trains can be rerouted to reverse direction.

The square in front of the station serves as terminus for Brussels tram route 92, as well as bus route 69. Bus routes 58 and 59 also stop there.

== History and building ==
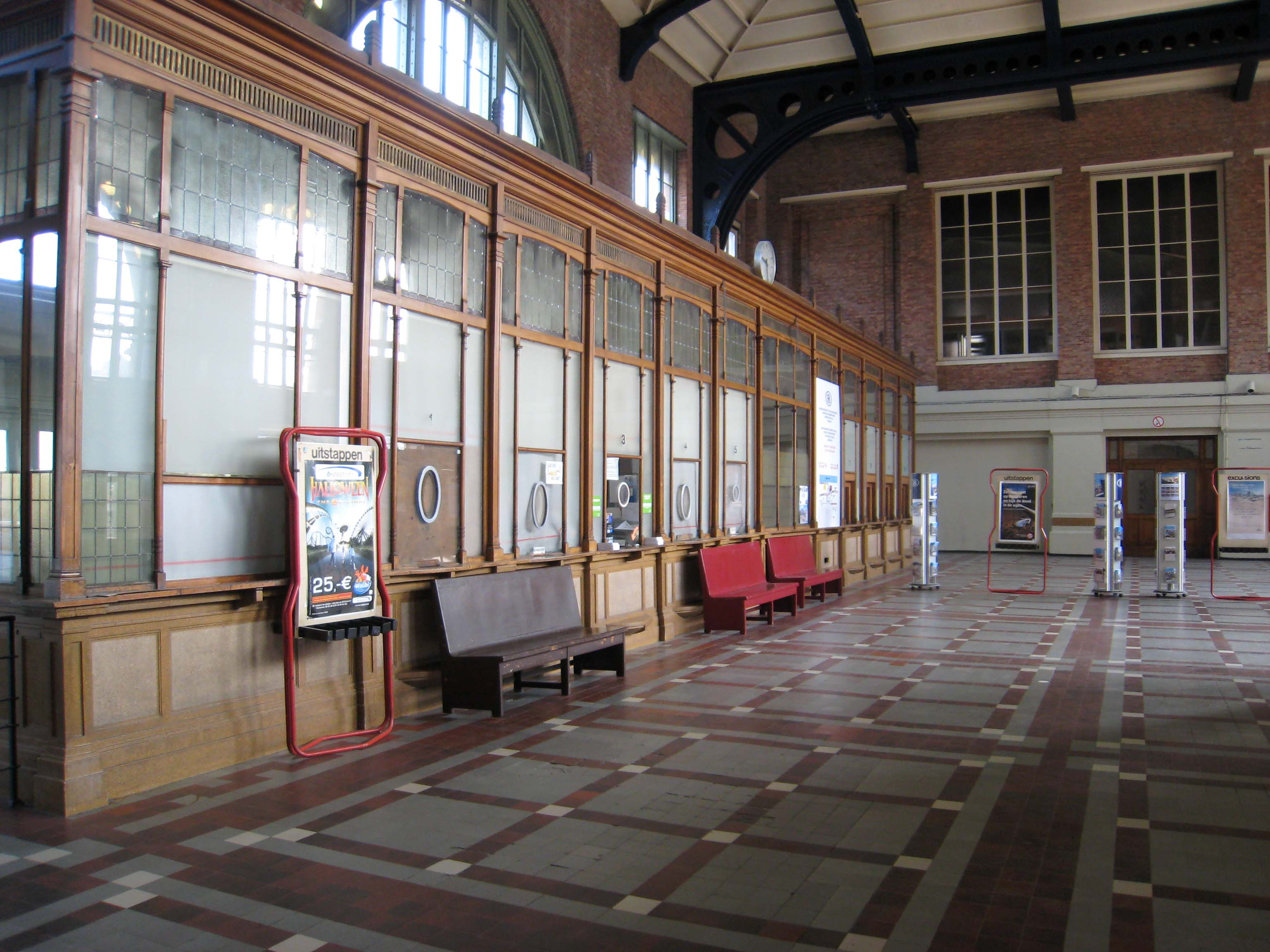
Ticket offices inside the station building in 2009 prior to its incorporation into Train World

The station building, in neo-Flemish Renaissance style, was designed by the architect Franz Seulen and built in two phases: the left wing around 1890 and the main (right) wing in 1913. The building was listed as a monument by the Brussels-Capital Region in 1994 and the facades have been restored. Before its closure in 2013, the building was largely disused though ticket counters were open for a limited time every weekday and concessions had been closed since the demise of the motorail services. Nowadays, the station is unstaffed with ticket machines at the entrance.

The station is relatively large, with 13 platforms, numbered from 3 to 15. Tracks 1 and 2 were used in the past for motorail services carrying passenger cars to destinations mainly in Southern France. These were transferred to Denderleeuw railway station in 2000, and eventually discontinued in 2003. Schaerbeek station lies to the south-west of extensive railway grounds including a goods station and a traction workshop.

== Train services ==
The station is served by the following service(s):

- Brussels RER services (S1) Antwerp - Mechelen - Brussels - Waterloo - Nivelles (weekdays)
- Brussels RER services (S1) Antwerp - Mechelen - Brussels (weekends)
- Brussels RER services (S2) Leuven - Brussels - Halle - Braine-le-Comte
- Brussels RER services (S6) Schaarbeek - Brussels - Halle - Geraardsbergen - Denderleeuw - Aalst
- Brussels RER services (S81) Schaarbeek - Brussels-Luxembourg - Etterbeek - Ottignies (weekdays, peak hours only)

Preceding station	NMBS/SNCB	Following station
Buda towards Antwerpen-Centraal	S 1 weekdays	Bruxelles-Nord / Brussel-Noord towards Nivelles
Vilvoorde towards Antwerpen-Centraal	S 1 weekends	Bruxelles-Nord / Brussel-Noord towards Bruxelles-Midi / Brussel-Zuid
Haren-South towards Leuven	S 2	Bruxelles-Nord / Brussel-Noord towards Braine-le-Comte
Terminus	S 6	Bruxelles-Nord / Brussel-Noord towards Aalst
Terminus	S 81 weekdays	Brussels-Schuman towards Ottignies

== Train World ==
Train World, the national railway museum of Belgium, is located at Schaarbeek railway station, incorporating the station building, and was open to the public for the first time on 25 September 2015, having been formally opened the previous day by King Philippe. Until then, €20.5 million had been invested into the project, which planned to attract 100,000 visitors per year from its third year of operations onwards.

== See also ==
- List of railway stations in Belgium
- Rail transport in Belgium
- Transport in Brussels
- History of Brussels
