= Belgian railway line 50 =

Railway line between Brussels and Ghent, Belgium

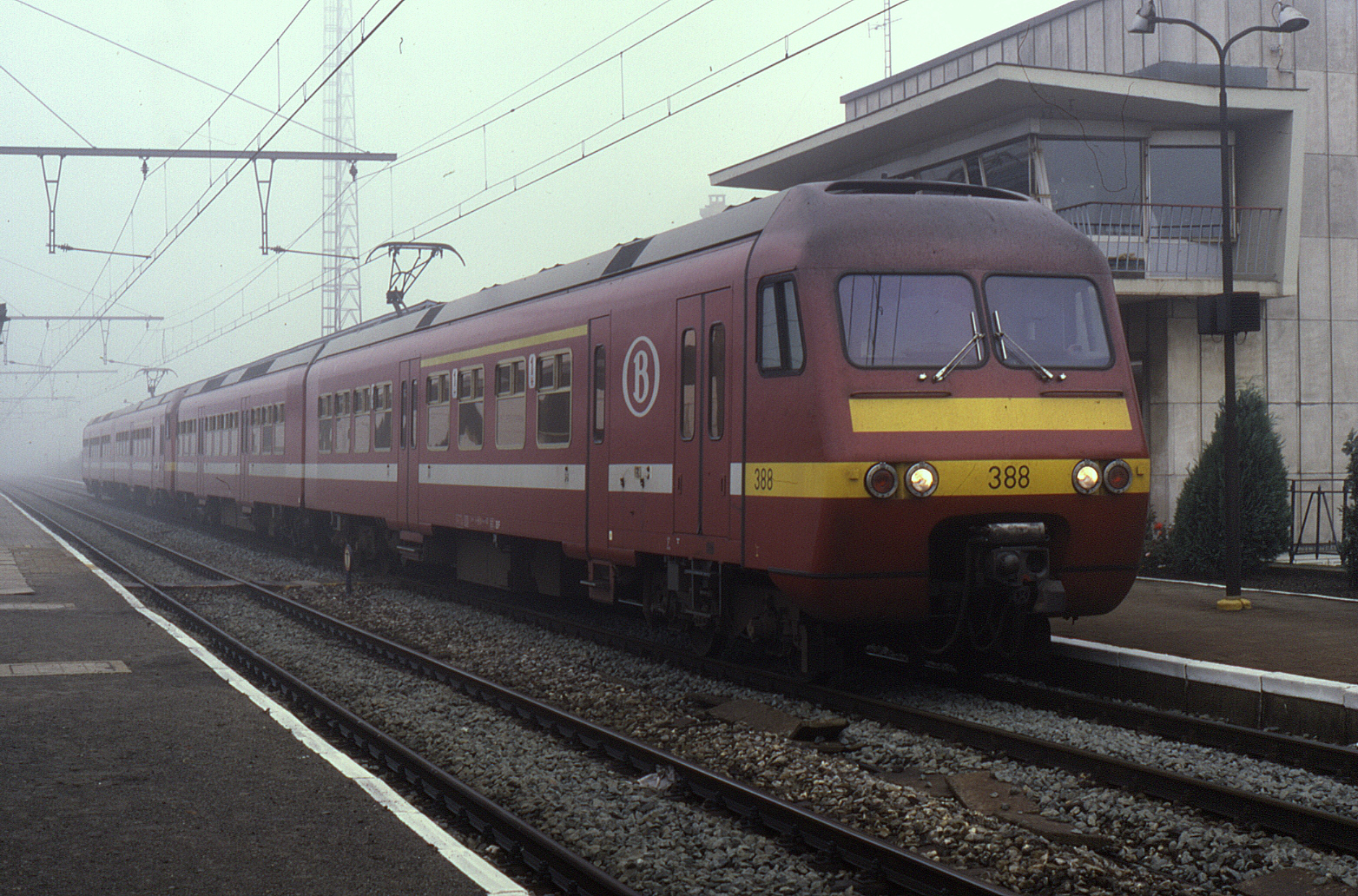
- A train at Denderleeuw station in 1987

Overview
- Status: Operational
- Locale: Belgium
- Termini: Brussels-North railway station; Gent-Sint-Pieters railway station

Service
Services
- Operator: National Railway Company of Belgium

History
- Opened: 1837-1856

Technical
- Line length: 56 km (35 mi)
- Num of tracks: double track
- Track gauge: 1,435 mm (4 ft 8 1/2 in) standard gauge
- Electrification: 3 kV DC
Route map
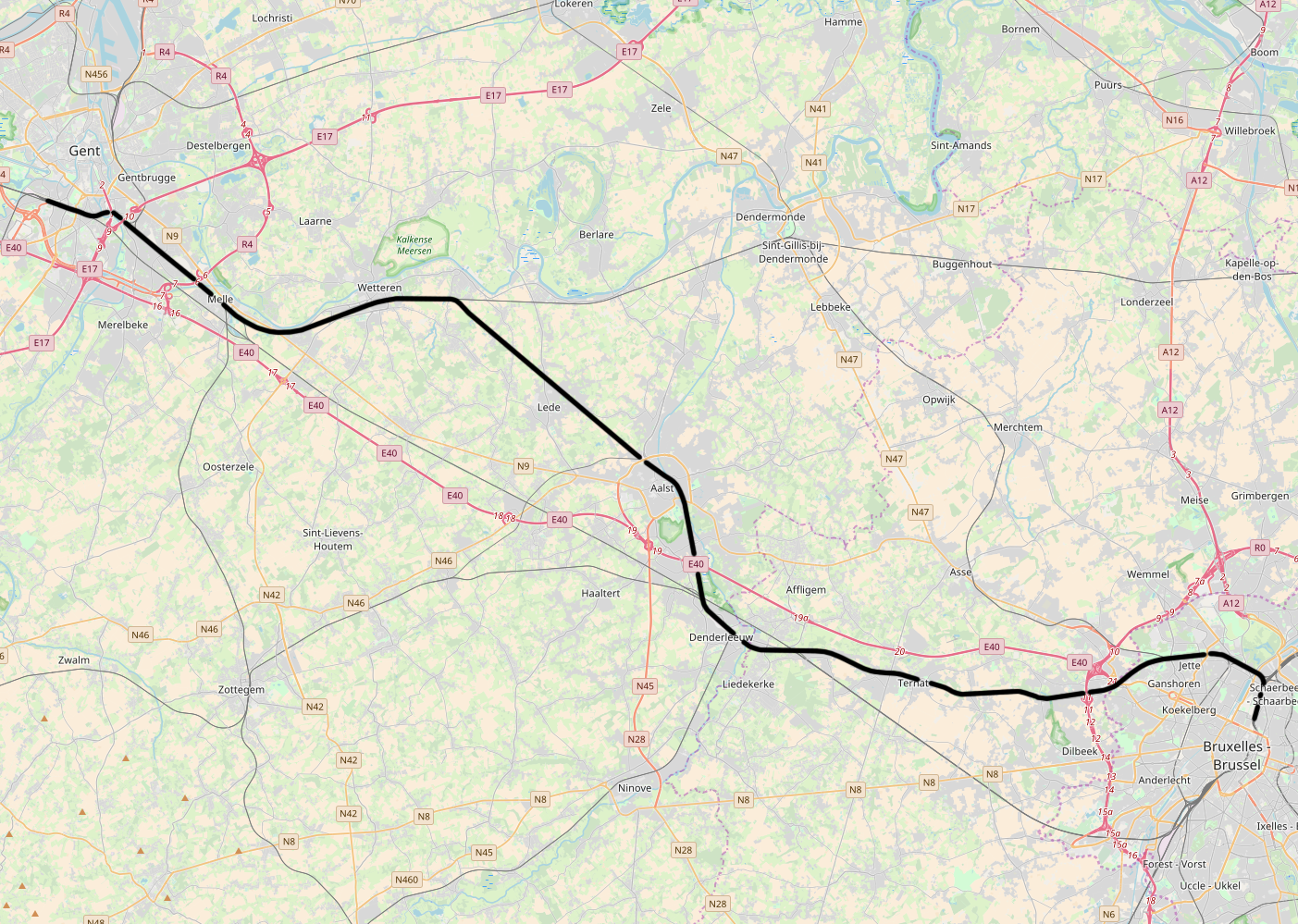

The Belgian railway line 50 is a railway line in Belgium connecting Brussels to Ghent. The first section between Ghent and Schellebelle was finished in 1837, offering a connection to Brussels through Dendermonde and Mechelen. The section between Schellebelle and Brussels was completed on 1 May 1856.

A section between Ghent and Ostend was completed in 1838 and is named line 50A. Between 1923 and 1933, line 50A was extended to Brussels, which provides a fast connection between Brussels and Ghent. Where the original line 50 enters Brussels from the north, after passing through Aalst, the latter 50A enters Brussels from the south; this allows through trains from the west of the country to the east or vice versa without having to reverse. In 2016, line 50A was widened with two extra tracks, labelled 50C, between Denderleeuw and Brussels; the main reason was the increase in traffic from the GEN/RER commuter trains.

The following stations are located on the original line 50:

- Brussels-North
- Bockstael
- Jette
- Berchem-Sainte-Agathe/Sint-Agatha-Berchem
- Groot-Bijgaarden
- Dilbeek
- Sint-Martens-Bodegem
- Ternat
- Essene Lombeek
- Liedekerke
- Denderleeuw
- Erembodegem
- Aalst
- Lede
- Serskamp
- Schellebelle
- Wetteren
- Kwatrecht
- Melle
- Merelbeke
- Gent-Sint-Pieters

A new CERIA/COOVI station was built in Anderlecht, near the CERIA/COOVI campus; it entered service with the updated schedules on 14 December 2020, with an hourly service by the S3 line of the Brussels Regional Express Network.
