= Denderleeuw railway station =

Railway station in East Flanders, Belgium

Denderleeuw
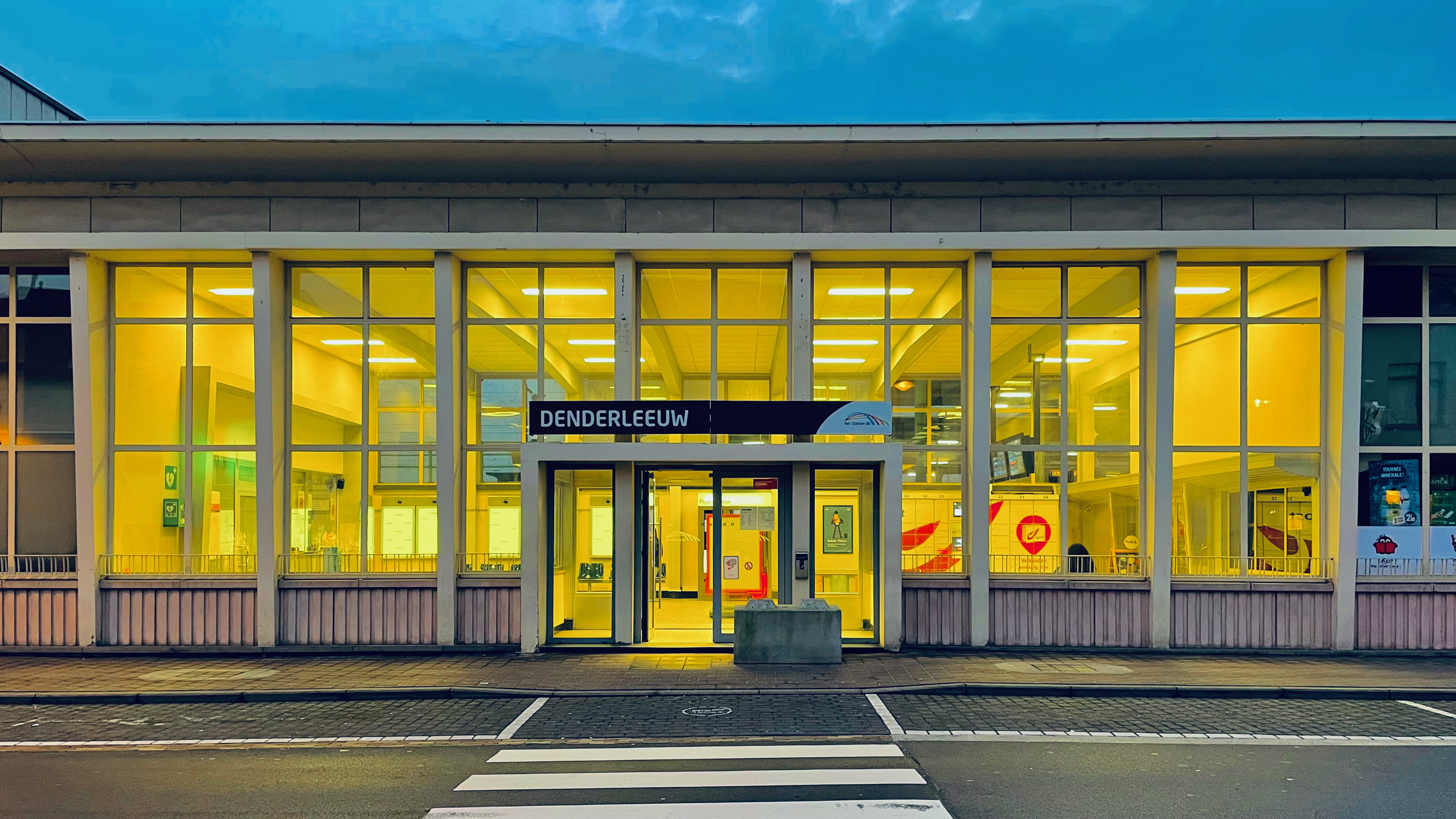
- Denderleeuw railway station

General information
- Location: Denderleeuw, East Flanders; Belgium
- Coordinates: 50°53′30″N 4°04′19″E
- System: Railway Station
- Owner: NMBS/SNCB
- Operator: NMBS/SNCB
- Lines: 50 (Brussels-Ghent); 89 (Denderleeuw-Kortrijk); 90 (Denderleeuw-Saint-Ghislain)
- Platforms: 9

Other information
- Station code: FDD
- Website: Official website

History
- Opened: 7 April 1855; 171 years ago

Passengers
- 2014: 8,748 per day
Location
- Location within Belgium Location within Europe

Denderleeuw railway station (Dutch: Station Denderleeuw; French: Gare de Denderleeuw) (Note: Officially Denderleeuw) is a railway station in Denderleeuw, East Flanders, Belgium. The station opened on 7 April 1855 and is located on railway lines 50, 89 and 90. The train services are operated by the National Railway Company of Belgium (NMBS/SNCB).

== Train services ==
The station is served by the following services:

- Intercity services (IC-13) Kortrijk - Denderleeuw - Brussels - Schaarbeek (weekdays)
- Intercity services (IC-20) Ghent - Aalst - Brussels - Hasselt - Tongeren (weekdays)
- Intercity services (IC-20) Ghent - Aalst - Brussels - Dendermonde - Lokeren (weekends)
- Intercity services (IC-23) Ostend - Bruges - Kortrijk - Zottegem - Brussels - Brussels Airport
- Intercity services (IC-29) Ghent - Aalst - Brussels - Brussels Airport - Leuven - Landen (weekdays)
- Intercity services (IC-29) De Panne - Ghent - Aalst - Brussels - Brussels Airport - Leuven - Landen (weekends)
- Brussels RER services (S3) Zottegem - Denderleeuw - Brussels - Dendermonde (weekdays)
- Brussels RER services (S3) Zottegem - Denderleeuw - Brussels - Schaarbeek (weekends)
- Brussels RER services (S4) Aalst - Denderleeuw - Brussels-Luxembourg - Etterbeek - Vilvoorde - Mechelen (weekdays)
- Brussels RER services (S6) Aalst - Denderleeuw - Geraardsbergen - Halle - Brussels - Schaarbeek (weekdays)
- Brussels RER services (S6) Denderleeuw - Geraardsbergen - Halle - Brussels - Schaarbeek (weekends)
- Brussels RER services (S10) Aalst - Denderleeuw - Brussels - Dendermonde

Preceding station	NMBS/SNCB	Following station
Aalst towards Gent-Sint-Pieters	IC 20 weekdays, except holidays	Liedekerke towards Tongeren
Aalst towards Gent-Sint-Pieters	IC 20 weekends	Liedekerke towards Lokeren
Haaltert towards Oostende	IC 23	Bruxelles-Midi / Brussel-Zuid towards Brussels National Airport
Erembodegem towards De Panne	IC 29	Liedekerke towards Landen
Welle towards Oudenaarde	S 3 weekdays	Bruxelles-Midi / Brussel-Zuid towards Dendermonde
Erembodegem towards Aalst	S 4 weekdays	Liedekerke towards Mechelen
Terminus	S 6 weekends	Iddergem towards Schaarbeek
Aalst Terminus	S 6	Iddergem towards Schaarbeek
Erembodegem towards Aalst	S 10	Liedekerke towards Dendermonde

== Gallery ==
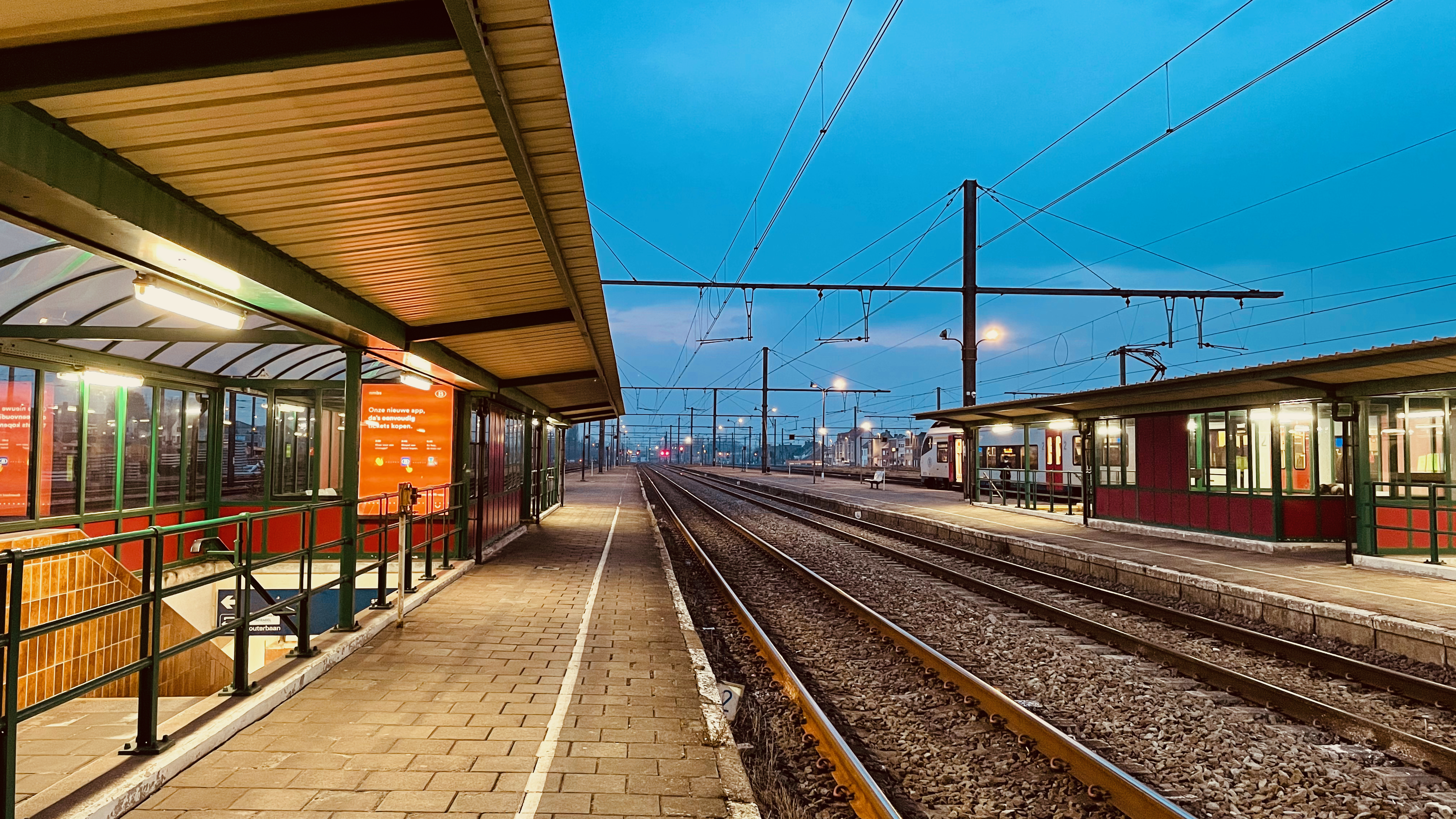
View of the platforms and tracks

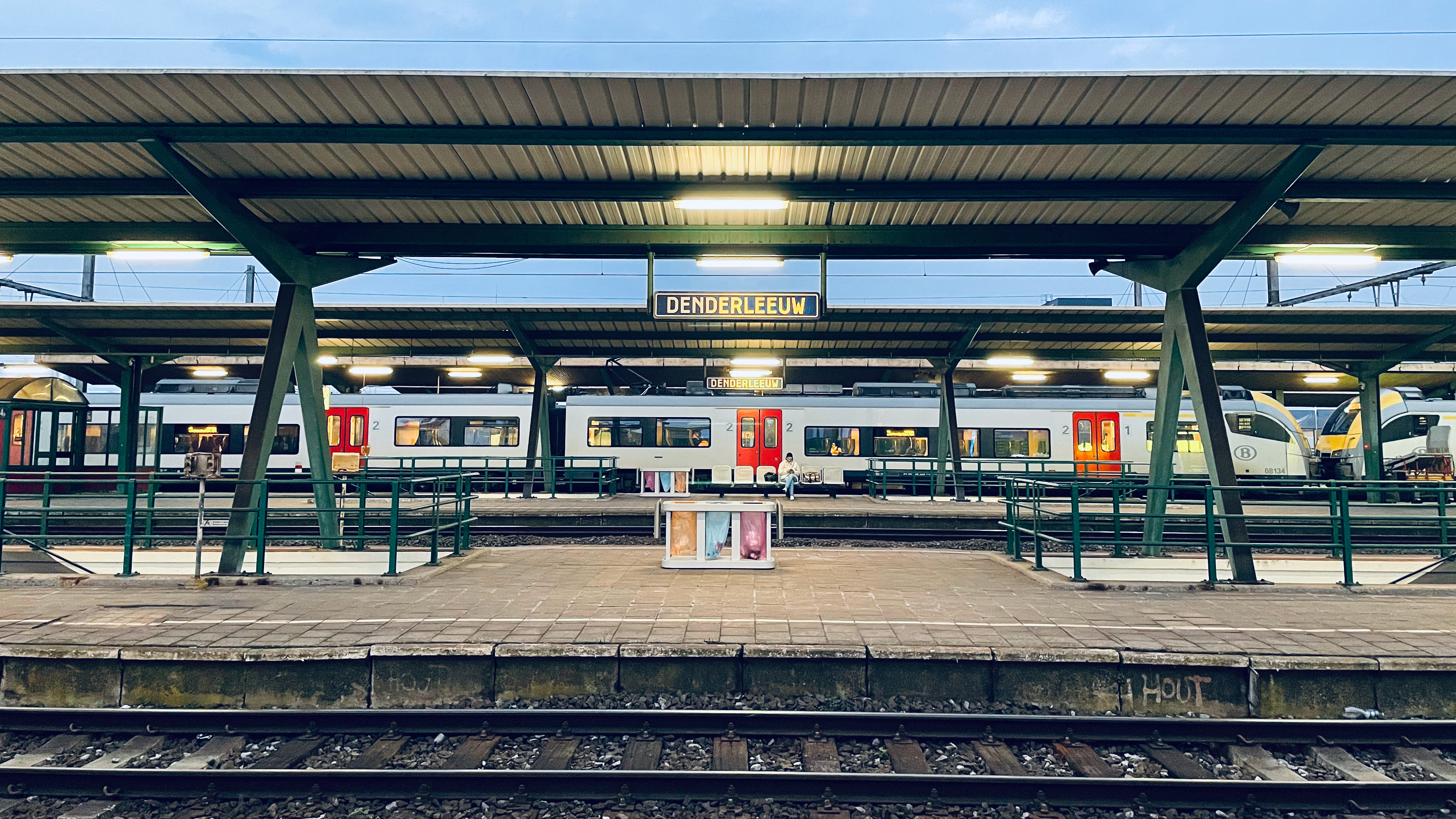
Place name sign on a platform

== See also ==
- List of railway stations in Belgium
- Rail transport in Belgium
