= Aalst railway station =

Railway station in East Flanders, Belgium

Aalst
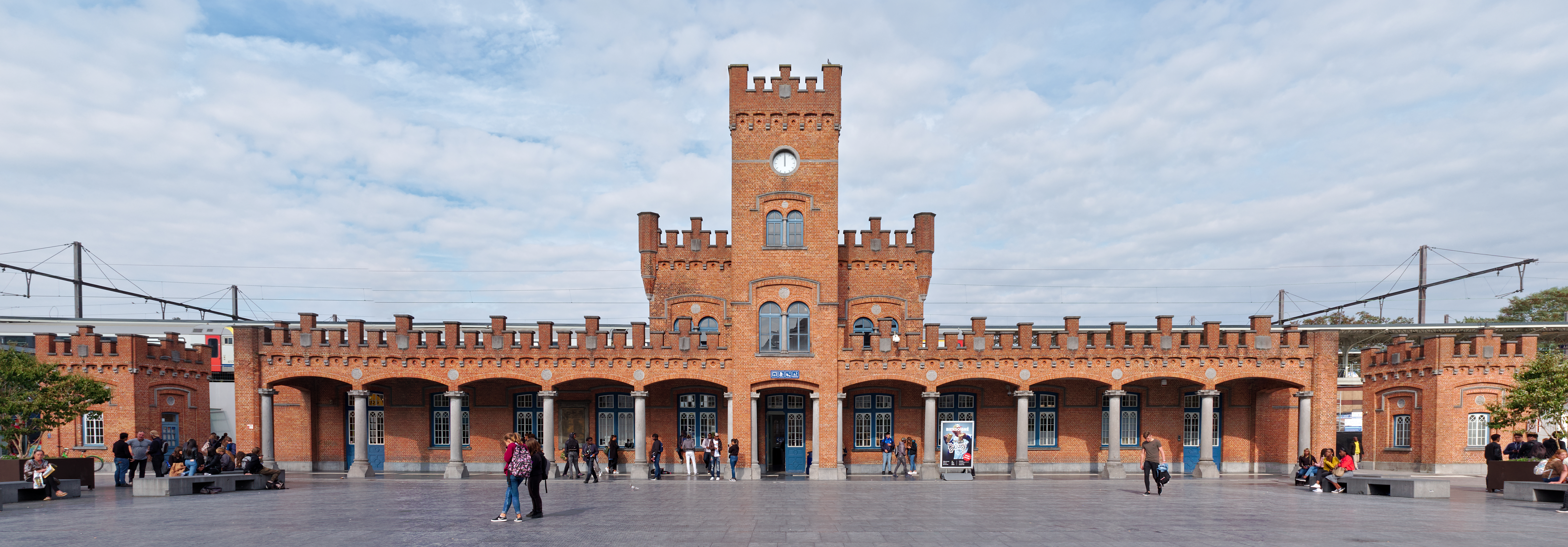
- Aalst railway station

General information
- Location: Aalst, East Flanders; Belgium
- Coordinates: 50°56′45″N 4°02′21″E
- System: Railway Station
- Owner: NMBS/SNCB
- Operator: NMBS/SNCB
- Lines: 50 (Brussels-Ghent); 82 (Aalst-Ronse)
- Platforms: 4
- Tracks: 7

Other information
- Station code: FLS
- Website: Official website

History
- Opened: 9 June 1853; 173 years ago

Passengers
- 2014: 7,112 per day
Location
- Location within Belgium Location within Europe

Aalst railway station (Dutch: Station Aalst; French: Gare d'Alost) (Note: Officially Aalst (Dutch: Aalst; French: Alost)) is a railway station in Aalst, East Flanders, Belgium. The station opened on 9 June 1853 and is located on railway lines 50 and 82. The train services are operated by the National Railway Company of Belgium (NMBS/SNCB).

== History ==
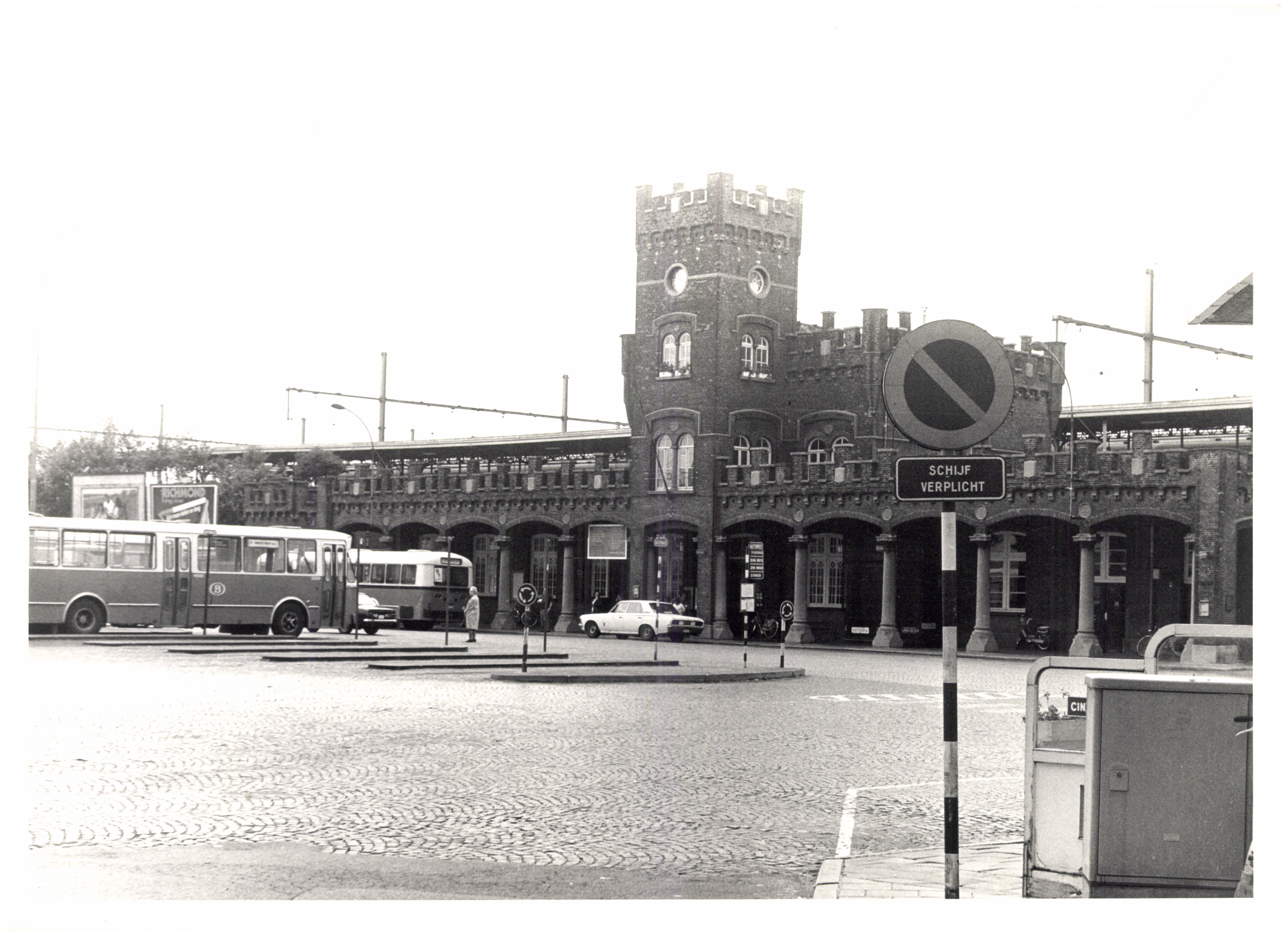
Aalst railway station in the 1970s

The station originally opened on line 57 (Aalst–Dendermonde–Lokeren) with line 50 opening on 7 April 1855. On 1 June 1876, the station was connected with Zottegem on line 82 and on 12 October 1879, the line 61 to Antwerp opened. Aalst was disconnected from line 61 on 2 June 1957. The connection between Aalst and Dendermonde was closed on 31 May 1964.

Since 2006, the station area has been undergoing heavy redevelopment. This resulted in a new subway with lifts, new platforms, a new bus station, a new car park, two new covered bicycle parking lots, a newsagent, a bicycle recovery point, a renovated station square and renovated neighbouring streets and project development.

== Architecture ==
The station building was designed by the architect Jean-Pierre Cluysenaar in 1852 and was officially inaugurated on 6 July 1856 by Crown Prince Leopold, later King Leopold II. The architectural style of the building is a mixture of a medieval castle and a Gothic town hall. The building was erected in Boomse baksteen and bluestone, which is reminiscent of the Tudorgotiek. The two side pavilions and the canopy (which is no longer present) on the platform side were added in 1890. It is the only city station by Jean-Pierre Cluysenaar that still exists.

== Facilities ==
The station has a buffet restaurant, baggage lockers and free cycle storage. There is a car park for paid parking. There are facilities for people of reduced mobility. There is a De Lijn bus station on the Dokter André Sierensstraat.

== Station layout ==
The station consists of 2 levels:

- Level 0: main building with ticketing facilities and commercial space, 2 subways
- Level 1: 4 platforms with a total of 7 tracks

== Train services ==
The station is served by the following services:

- Intercity services (IC-20) Ghent - Aalst - Brussels - Hasselt - Tongeren (weekdays)
- Intercity services (IC-20) Ghent - Aalst - Brussels - Dendermonde - Lokeren (weekends)
- Intercity services (IC-29) Ghent - Aalst - Brussels - Brussels Airport - Leuven - Landen (weekdays)
- Intercity services (IC-29) De Panne - Ghent - Aalst - Brussels - Brussels Airport - Leuven - Landen (weekends)
- Brussels RER services (S4) Aalst - Denderleeuw - Brussels-Luxembourg Etterbeek - Vilvoorde - Mechelen (weekdays)
- Brussels RER services (S6) Aalst - Denderleeuw - Geraardsbergen - Halle - Brussels - Schaarbeek (weekdays)
- Brussels RER services (S10) Aalst - Denderleeuw - Brussels - Dendermonde

Preceding station	NMBS/SNCB	Following station
Lede towards Gent-Sint-Pieters	IC 20 weekdays, except holidays	Denderleeuw towards Tongeren
Lede towards Gent-Sint-Pieters	IC 20 weekends	Denderleeuw towards Lokeren
Lede towards De Panne	IC 29	Erembodegem towards Landen
Terminus	S 4 weekdays	Erembodegem towards Mechelen
Terminus	S 6 weekdays	Denderleeuw towards Schaarbeek
Terminus	S 10	Erembodegem towards Dendermonde

== Gallery ==
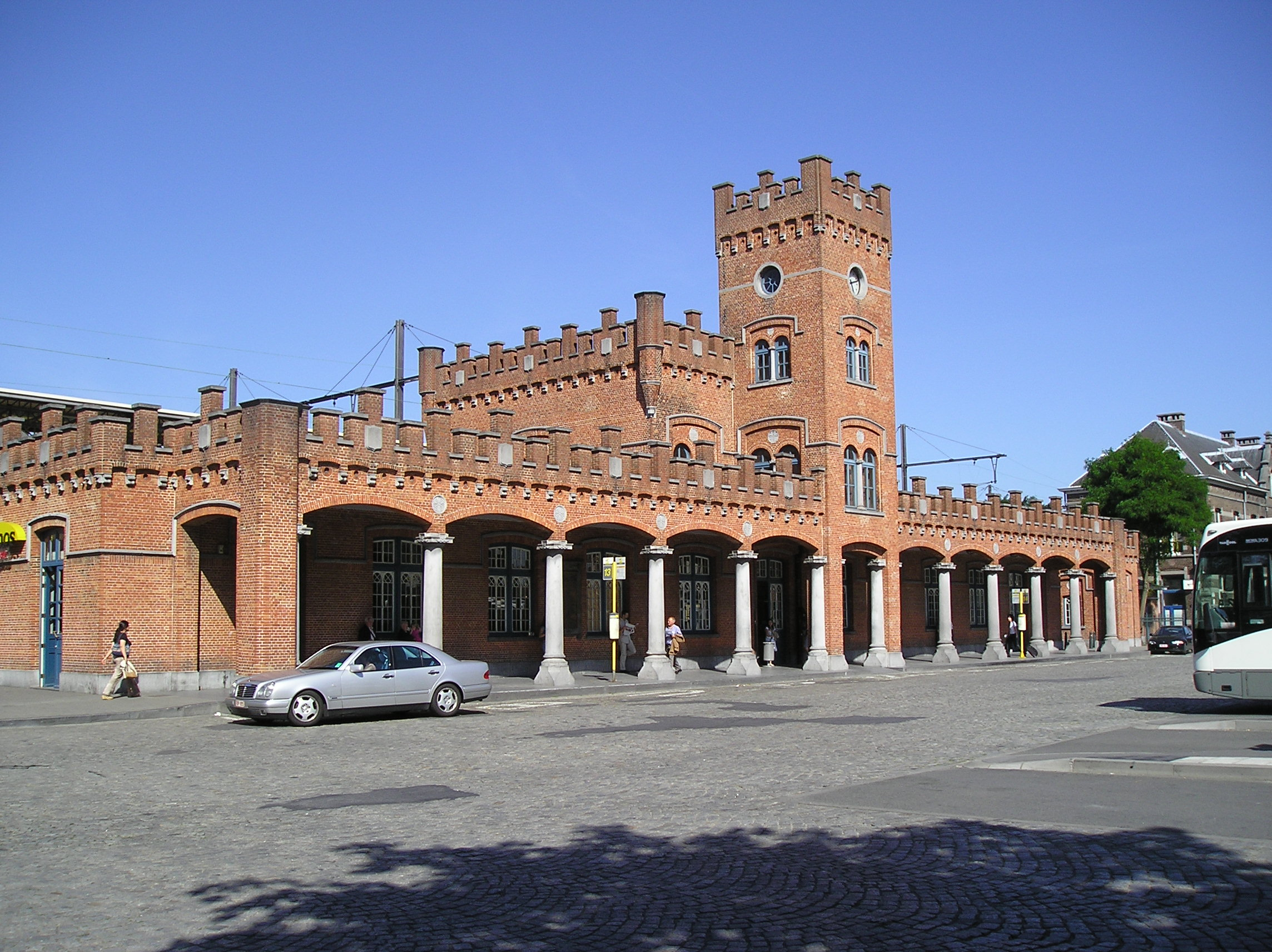
Frontal view

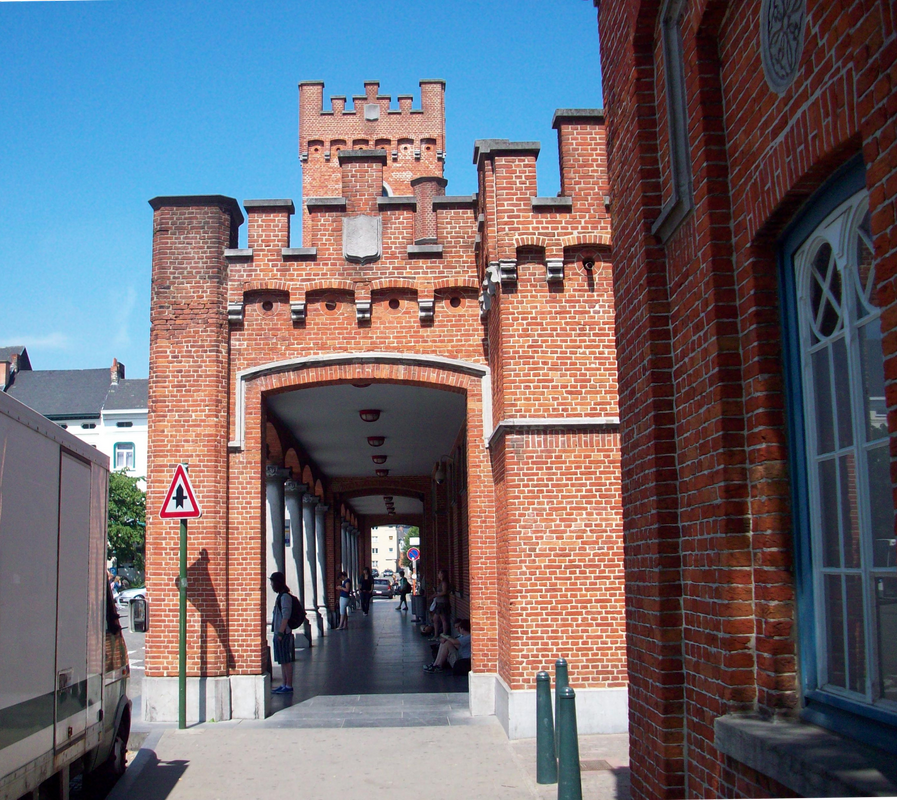
Lateral view

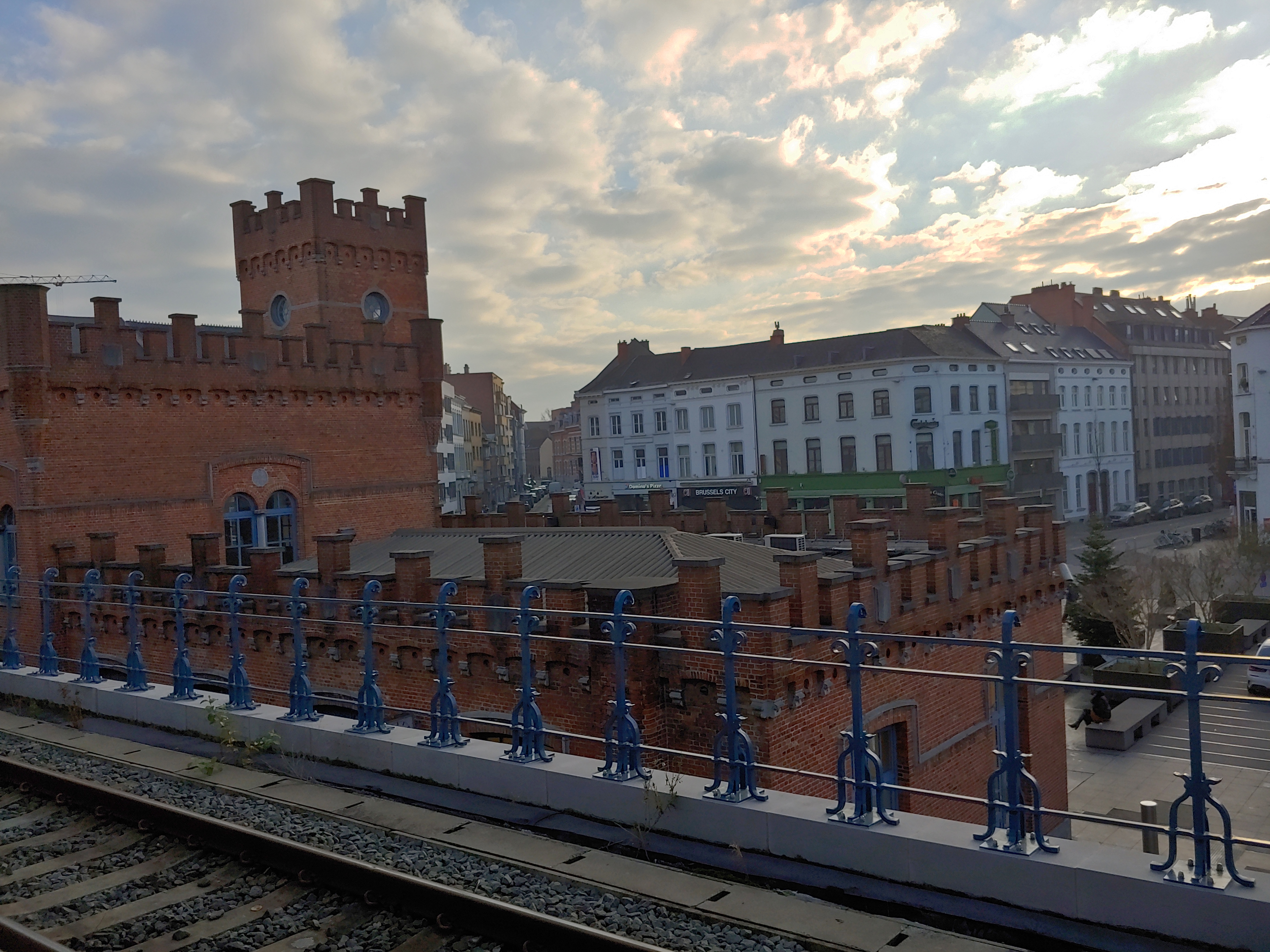
View from inside the station

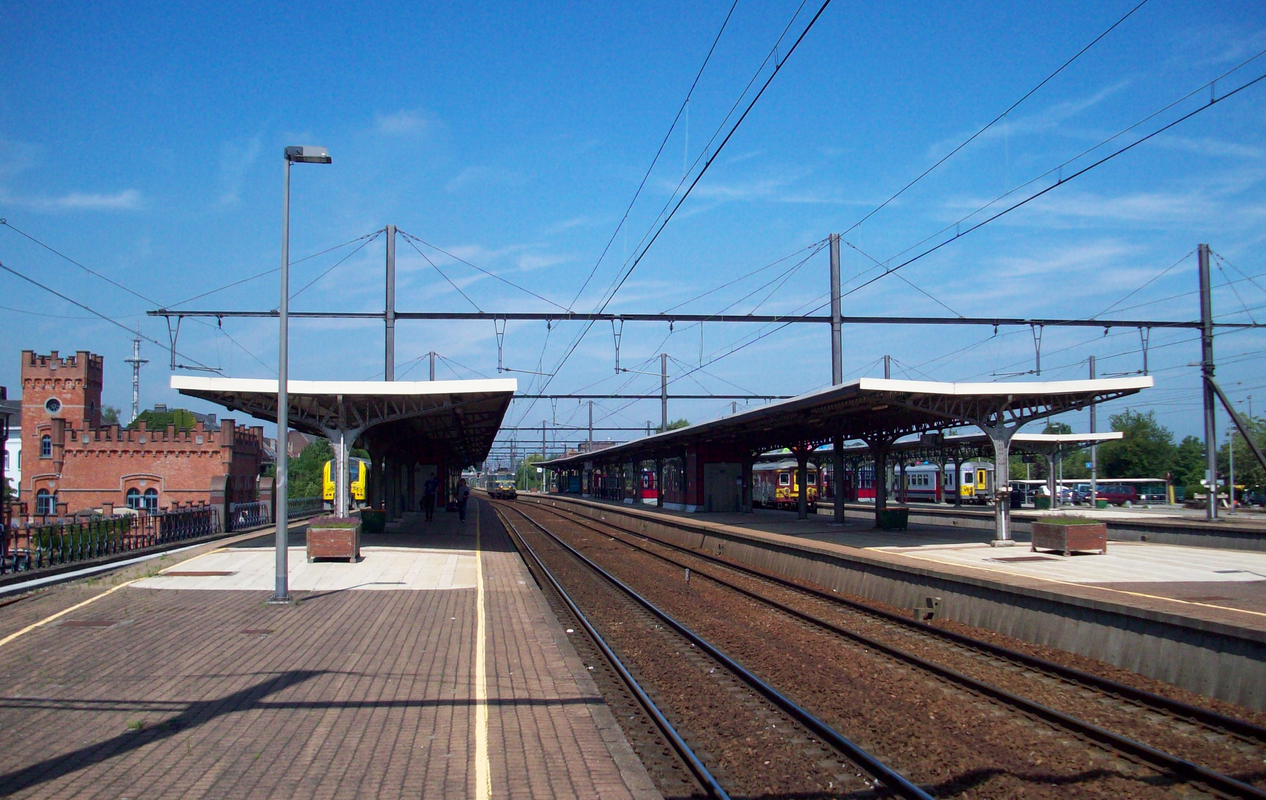
View of the platforms and tracks (before renovations)

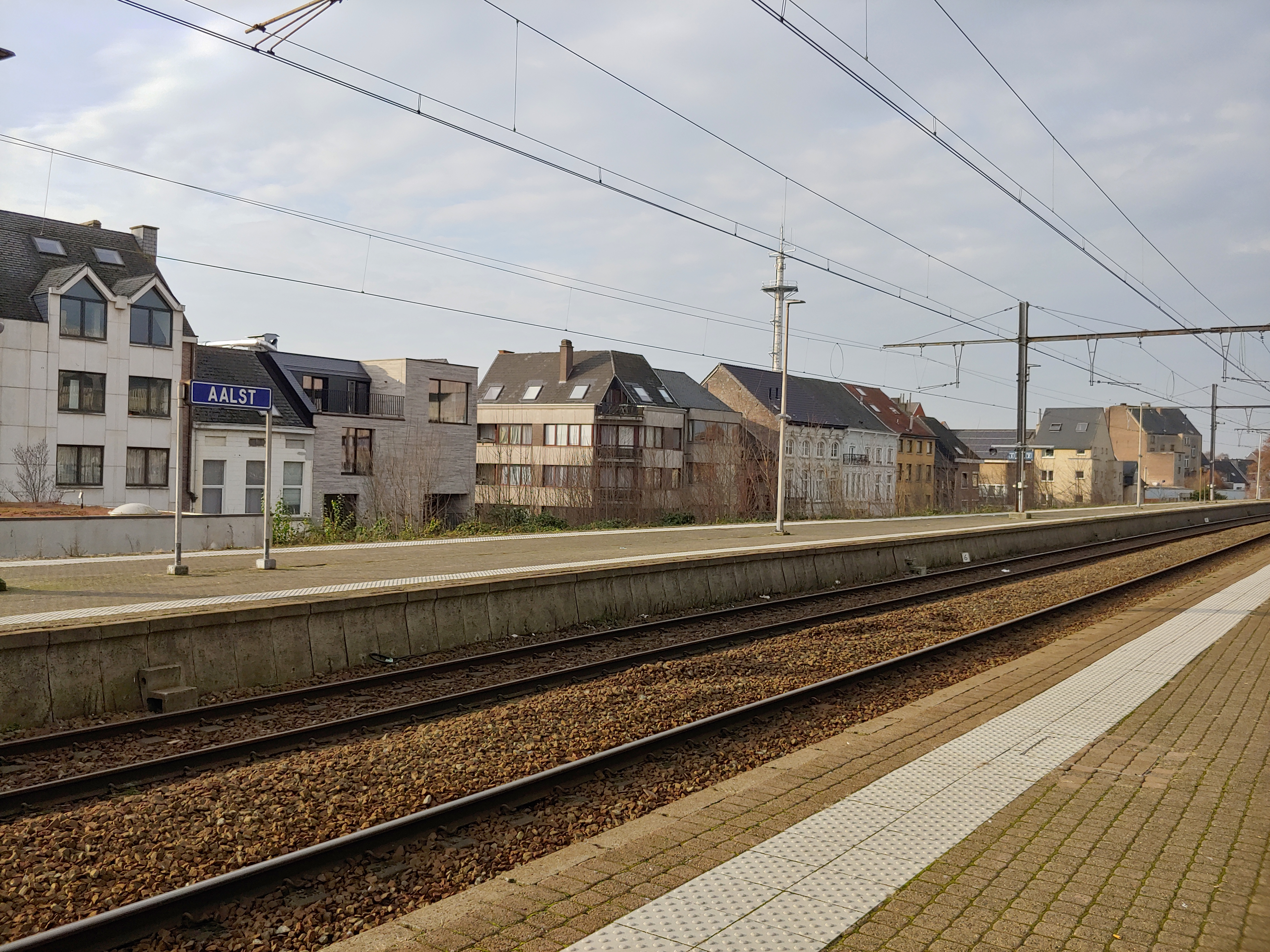
View of the tracks

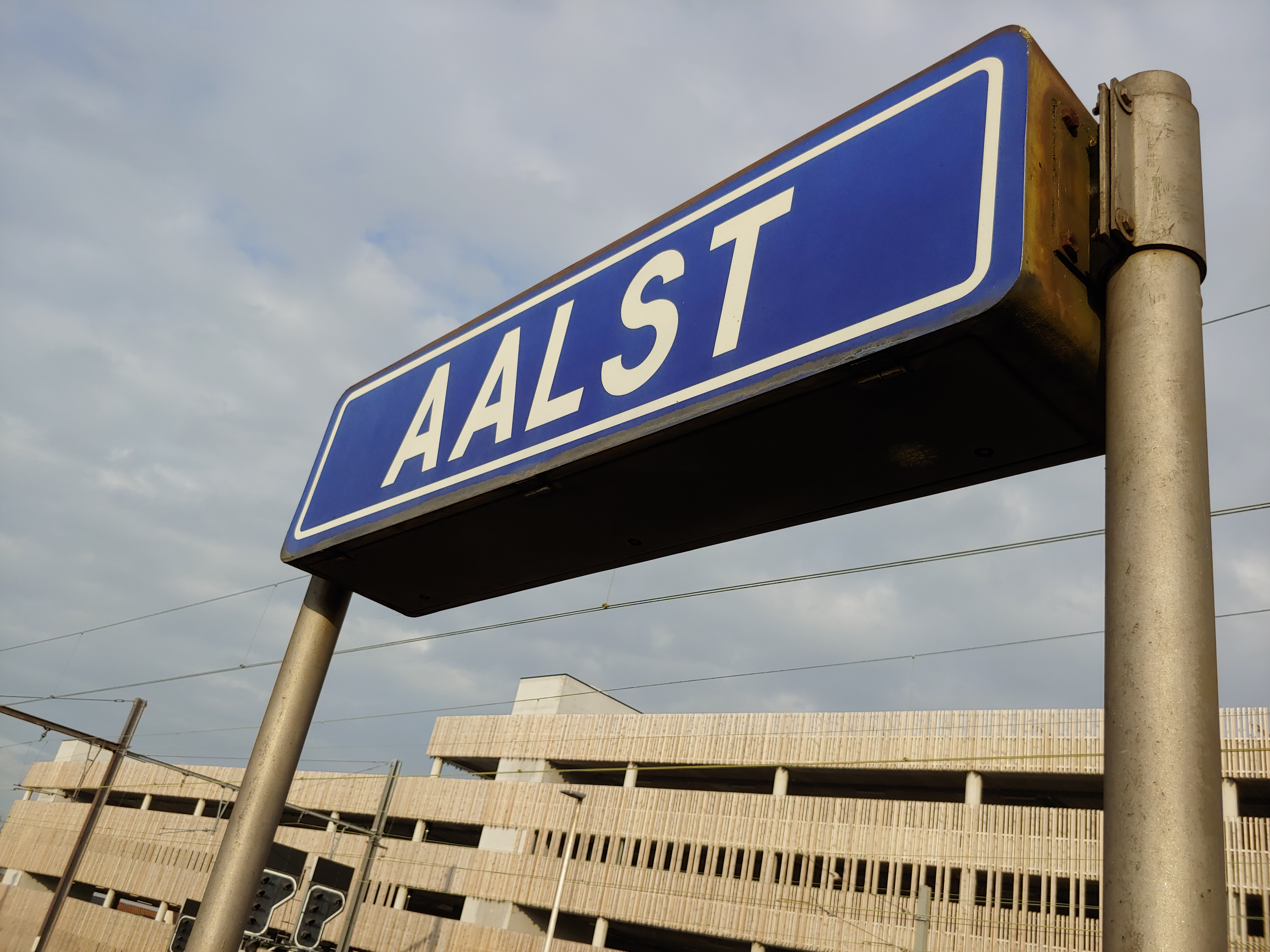
Place name sign

== See also ==
- List of railway stations in Belgium
- Rail transport in Belgium
