= Andrieux =

Andrieux is a French surname. People with the name include:

- Anne Andrieux (born 1979), French volleyball player
- Clément-Auguste Andrieux (1829–1880), French artist
- François Andrieux (1759–1833), French playwright
- Henri Andrieux (1931–2008), French cyclist
- Jacques Andrieux (1917–2005), French military aviator
- Louis Andrieux, French politician and father of Louis Aragon
- Luc Andrieux (1917–1977), French actor
- Mailyne Andrieux (born 1987), French tennis player
- Maurice Andrieux (1925–2008), French politician
- Michel Andrieux (born 1967), French rower
- Renatus Andrieux (1742–1792), French Jesuit killed during the French Revolution
- Robert Andrieux (fl. 1920), Belgian sports shooter
- Sylvie Andrieux (born 1961), French politician
- Virginie Andrieux (born 1980), French weightlifter

== See also ==
- Andrieu, a surname
