= Andrieu =

Andrieu is a name. People with the name include:

== Given name ==
- Andrieu Contredit d'Arras (c. 1200 – 1248), French poet-composer

== Surname ==
- Bernard Andrieu (born 1959), French philosopher and historian
- Bertrand Andrieu (1761–1822), French engraver
- Émile Andrieu (1881–1955), Belgian footballer
- Éric Andrieu (born 1960), French politician
- F. Andrieu (fl. late 14th century), French composer
- Julie Andrieu (born 1974), French television presenter
- Louis Andrieu (fl. 1920), Belgian sports shooter
- Marc Andrieu (born 1959), French rugby player
- Marie Andrieu (1851–1911), French anarchist
- Mathuren Arthur Andrieu (1822–1896), French painter
- Nicole Courcel (1931–2016), French actress, born Nicole Andrieu
- Pierre Andrieu (1849–1935), French Cardinal of the Roman Catholic Church
- Pierre Andrieu (artist) (1821–1892), French painter
- René Andrieu (1920–1998), French journalist and politician

== See also ==
- Andrieux, a surname
