= Waterloo, Belgium =

Municipality in Walloon Brabant province, Wallonia, Belgium

Waterloo: Waterlô (Walloon)
- Municipality
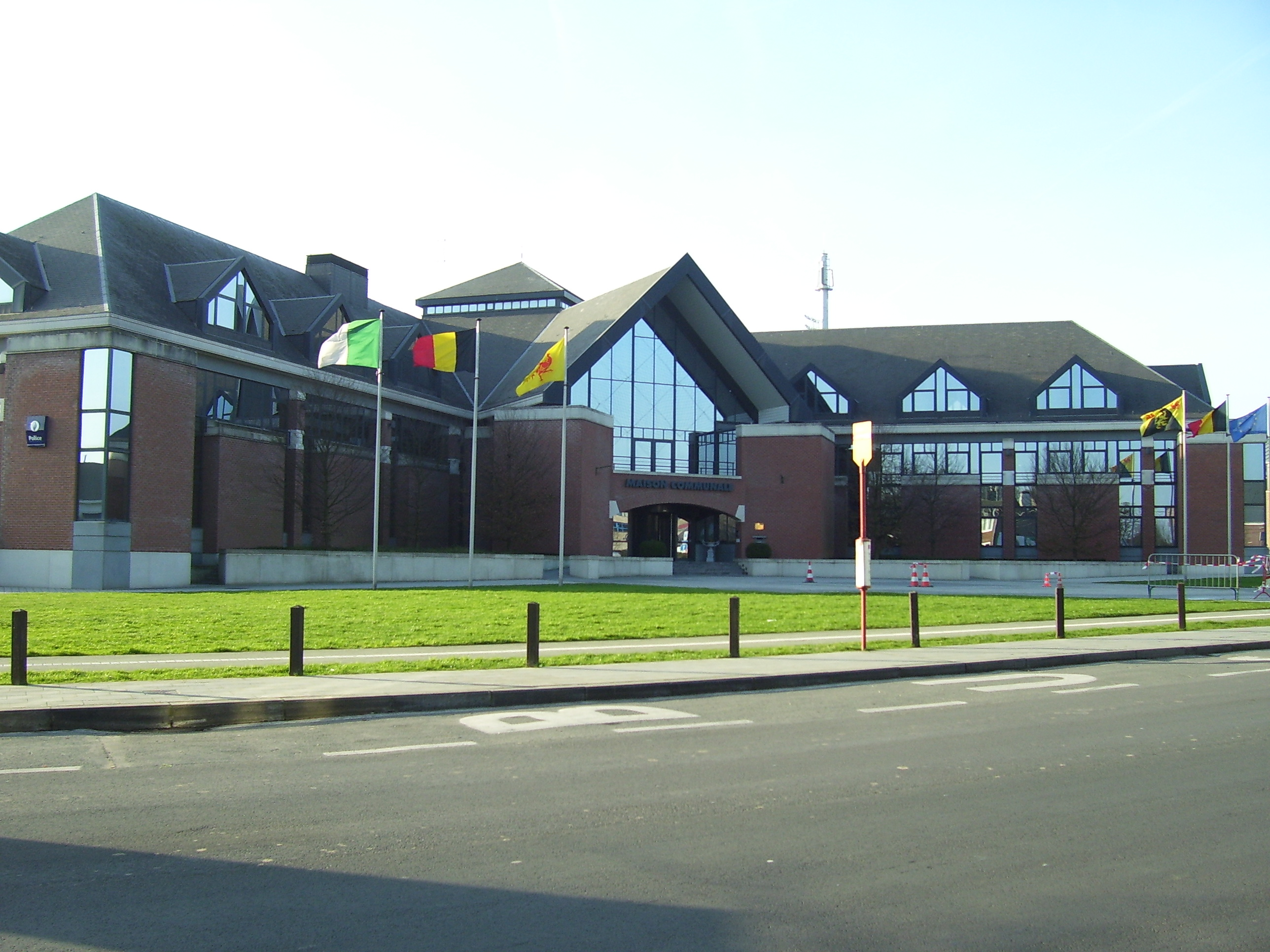
- Maison communale (city hall) of Waterloo

- Flag Coat of arms

- The municipality of Waterloo in Walloon Brabant
- Interactive map of Waterloo
- Location in Belgium
- Coordinates: 50°43′2.89″N 04°23′52.48″E
- Country: Belgium
- Community: French Community
- Region: Wallonia
- Province: Walloon Brabant
- Arrondissement: Nivelles

Government
  - Mayor: Florence Reuter (MR)
  - Governing party: MR

Area
  - Total: 21.32 km^{2} (8.23 sq mi)

Population (2018-01-01)
  - Total: 30,174
  - Density: 1,415/km^{2} (3,666/sq mi)
- Postal codes: 1410
- NIS code: 25110
- Area codes: 02
- Website: waterloo.be

Waterloo (French pronunciation: [watɛʁlo]; Dutch pronunciation: [ˈʋaːtərloː]; Walloon: Waterlô) is a municipality in Wallonia, located in the province of Walloon Brabant, Belgium, which in 2011 had a population of 29,706 and an area of 21.03 km^{2} (8.12 sq mi).

Waterloo lies a short distance south of Brussels and immediately south of the official language border between Flanders and Wallonia. Waterloo is most famous for being the site of the Battle of Waterloo in 1815, where Napoleon was defeated in the War of the Seventh Coalition.

== History ==
The name of Waterloo was mentioned for the first time in 1102 designating a small hamlet at the limit of what is today known as the Sonian Forest, along a major road linking Brussels, Genappe and a coal mine to the south. Waterloo was located at the intersection of the main road and a path leading to a small farming settlement in what is now Cense. The crossing can still be found today as the intersection of the Chaussée de Bruxelles with Boulevard de la Cense. Waterloo was a place where travellers and merchants, particularly those carrying coal from the mine to the south, could find rest and protection from bandits.

Waterloo was located in the Duchy of Brabant created in 1183 with Leuven as the capital city. The Duchy of Brabant extended from Luttre to 's-Hertogenbosch in 1477. Brussels became the capital city of the Duchy of Brabant in 1267 and the capital city of the Burgundian Netherlands in 1430.

Waterloo started to develop during the 17th century. A royal chapel was built in 1687 in Petit-Waterloo, and was extended in 1826, becoming the Church of Saint Joseph of Waterloo.

During the late 18th century, whilst the region was under the rule of the Holy Roman Empire, a period of unrest marked the wake of the 1789 French Revolution. Reforms designed to quell those agitating to bring enlightenment ideas to the region were unsuccessful. In 1794, the French invaded, bringing an end to the region's Ancien Régime, encompassing the monasteries, their official record-keeping, and the privileges of the nobility.

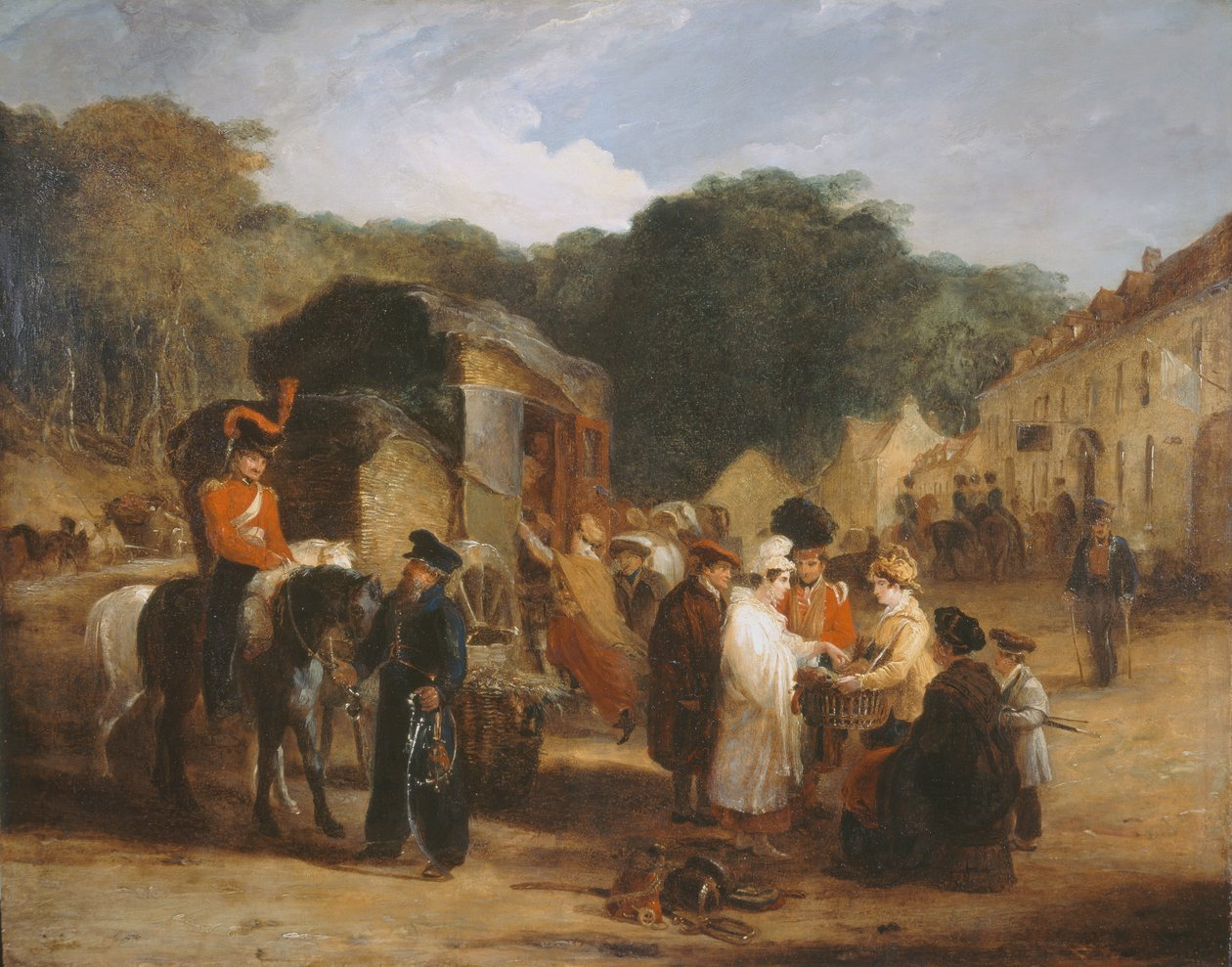
The Village of Waterloo by George Jones, 1821

Up until 1796, Waterloo was divided into two parts, Grand-Waterloo and Petit-Waterloo, depending, respectively, of the parishes of Braine-l'Alleud (Bishopric of Namur) and of Sint-Genesius-Rode (Bishopric of Mechelen). A new system based on municipalities was established under French rule. The municipality of Waterloo was created from Petit-Waterloo detached from Sint-Genesius-Rode and three former hamlets (Grand-Waterloo, Joli-Bois, Mont-Saint-Jean) detached from Braine-l’Alleud.

In 1813, half of the hamlet of Chenois was detached from Braine-l’Alleud and became part of Waterloo. In 1824, Waterloo grew again as the areas Roussart and Sainte-Gertrude from the Sonian Forest became part of the municipality. Waterloo had 1,571 inhabitants in 1801 and 3,202 in 1846.

In 1795, the invaded territories were divided into nine departments. Some municipalities, including Waterloo, became part of the Dyle department, which became the province of Brabant Méridional in 1815 under Dutch rule, following the defeat of Napoleon. Upon Belgian independence in 1830, it became part of the province of Brabant.

On 4 September 1944, Waterloo was liberated from German occupation by Allied forces.

In 1977, the second half of the hamlet of Chenois was detached from Braine-l’Alleud and became part of Waterloo together with a part of the hamlet next to the Lion.

In 1995, the province of Brabant was divided to match the limits of the administrative regions of Wallonia, Brussels and Flanders created in 1980. The part in which Waterloo is situated became the province of Walloon Brabant.

=== Battle of Waterloo ===
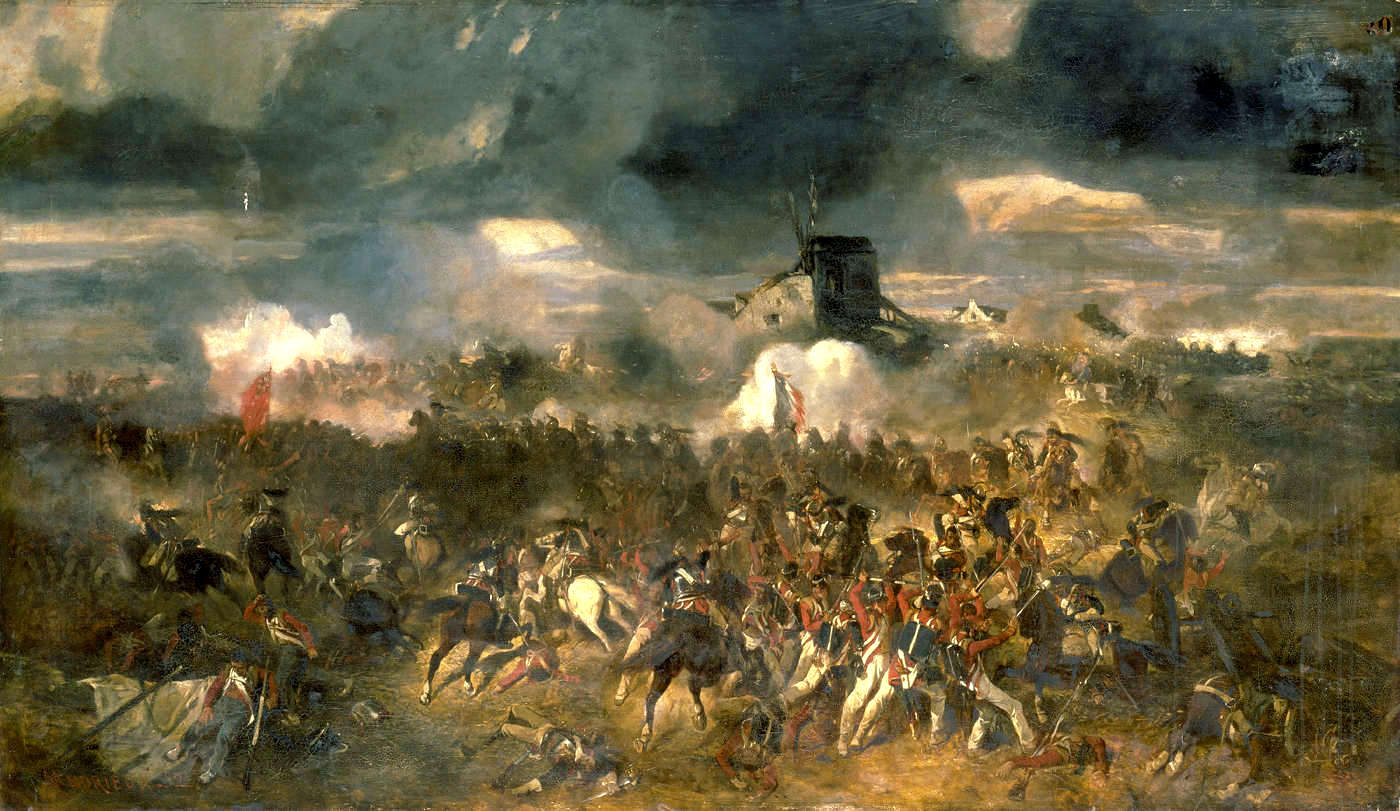
Clément-Auguste Andrieux's 1852 The Battle of Waterloo

The Battle of Waterloo took place near Waterloo on 18 June 1815 between the First French Empire of Napoleon Bonaparte and the Seventh Coalition (troops from Prussia, the United Kingdom, the Netherlands, Hanover, Brunswick and Nassau), under the main allied commanders, the Duke of Wellington and Field Marshal von Blücher. This battle is considered to be the decisive victory for the allied forces in deposing Napoleon forever. Napoleon had beaten both the Prussians, and the British (Technically a draw but a tactical victory for French troops) already at Lingy and, Quatre Bras and decided it was now or never to finish off the British army. Unfortunately, he couldn’t keep Blücher and Wellington away from each other long enough (mostly due to Marshall Ney not pursuing the British after Quatre Bras and Napoleons 30,000 men under Marshall Grouchy not pursuing the Prussians fast enough. All was officially lost for Napoleon that day and a few days later, he surrendered to the British after attempting to flee to America. It marked the end of 20 years of continuous death in Europe and brought an end to what is known as the Napoleonic Wars.

== Districts ==
Waterloo is divided into six districts: Faubourg Ouest (north-west of Chaussée de Bruxelles), Faubourg Est (north-east of Chaussée de Bruxelles), Chenois (west of the railway), Centre, Joli-Bois (south of centre) and Mont-St-Jean (north of the Waterloo battle field).

== Economy ==
Waterloo is home to the European headquarters of Mastercard. There is a Carrefour hypermarket in Mont-Saint-Jean, a Delhaize store, an Ibis Hotel, several BNP Paribas Fortis branches, office parks to the east of the town.

A row of shops, called Petit Paris is situated on the Chaussée de Bruxelles (which becomes Chaussée de Waterloo, or Waterloosesteenweg when leaving Waterloo in the north and nearing Brussels).

== Notable landmarks ==
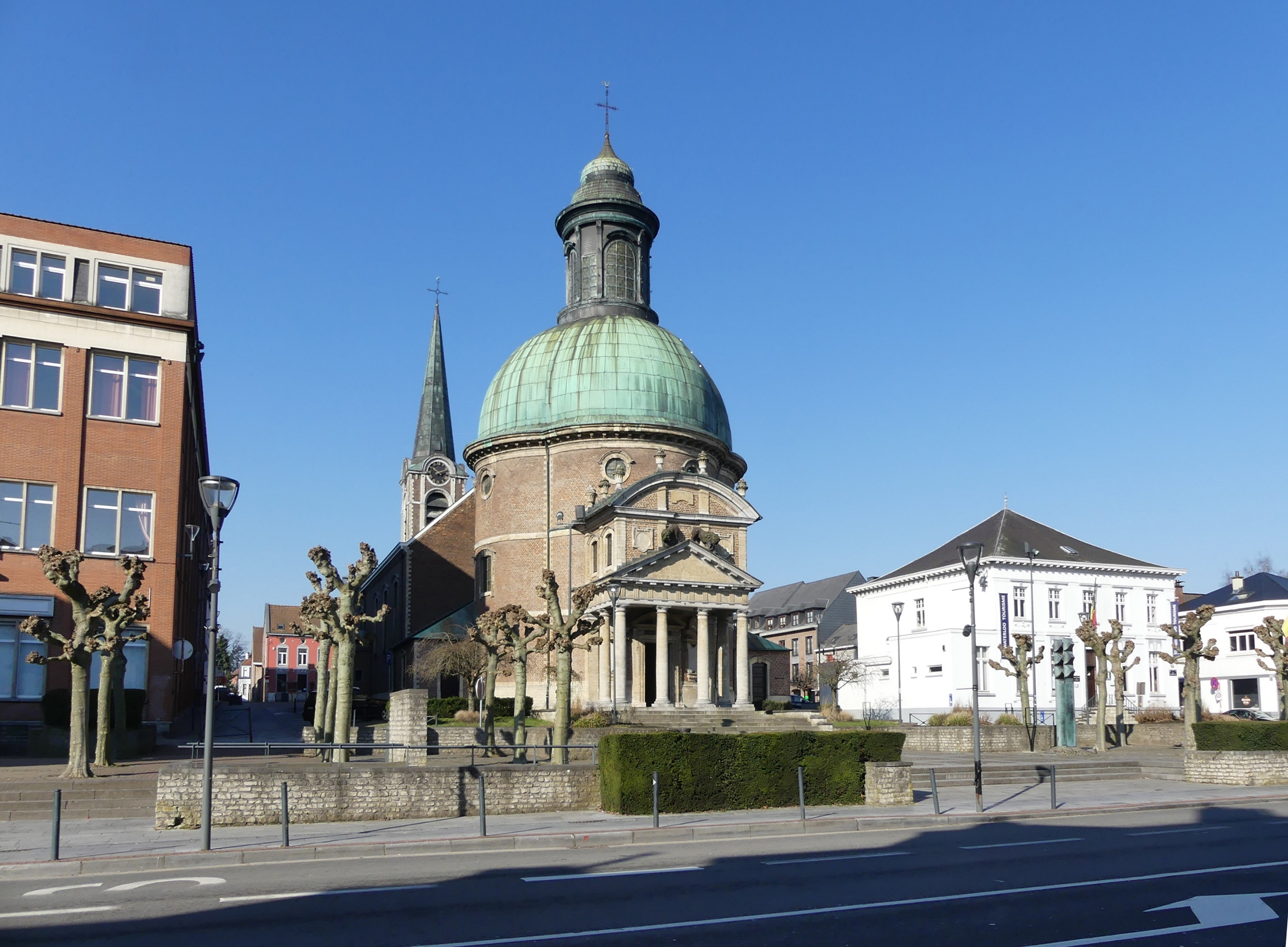
Church of Saint Joseph of Waterloo

=== Lion's Mound ===
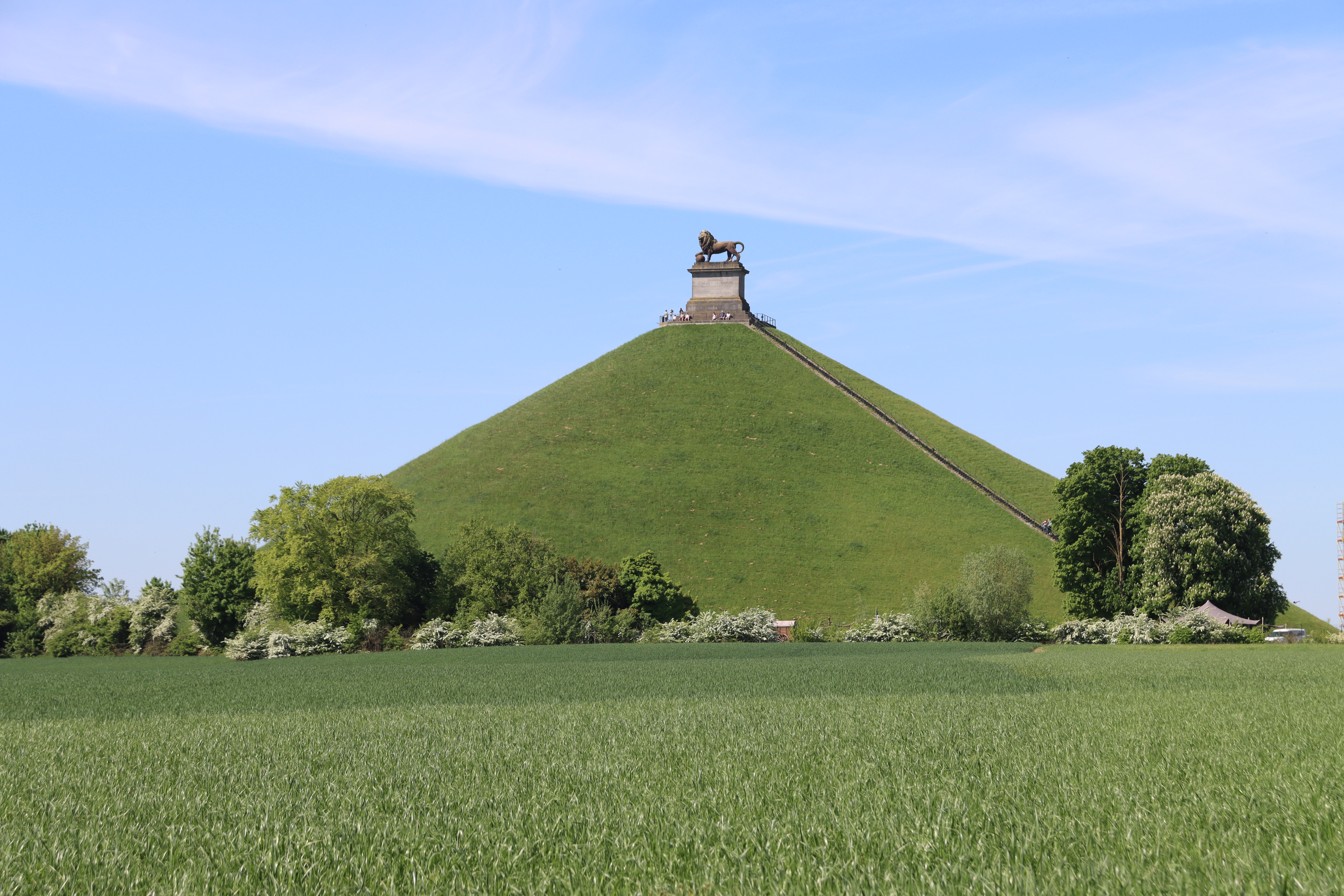
The immense Butte du Lion ("Lion's Mound") overlooking the battlefield of Waterloo

The Lion's Mound is a monument to the casualties of the 1815 Battle of Waterloo, located on the spot where a musket ball hit the shoulder of William II of the Netherlands (the Prince of Orange) and knocked him from his horse during the battle. A statue of a lion, looking towards France, standing upon a stone-block pedestal surmounts the hill. Visitors can climb the 226 steps to the top of the hill for a panoramic vista of the battlefield.

Other attractions nearby related to the battle are the Battle Panorama Mural, Wellington Museum, and the Roman Catholic Church of St. Joseph, where Wellington is said to have prayed before going into battle and where British and Dutch plaques commemorating the fallen are now to be seen.

=== Argenteuil estate ===
In 1831, approximately 250 hectares of land in the Sonian Forest was acquired by Ferdinand De Meeus, a member of the Belgian nobility, who bestowed the name "Argenteuil" to the estate. The first "Château d'Argenteuil", built in 1835 was destroyed by a fire in 1847, and rebuilt between 1856 and 1858 using a design by Belgian architect, Jean-Pierre Cluysenaar, and extensive landscaping of the surrounding lands by Édouard Keilig. In the 1920s the De Meeûs family incorporated the estate into the "Domaine d'Argenteuil SA", and in 1929 sold 145 hectares of the land to American businessman, William Hallam Tuck. Tuck and his wife, Belgian heiress, Hilda Bunge, commissioned New York architect, William Delano, to design the second major residence on the Argenteuil estate, the "Château Bellevue". Whilst the couple occupied the property, it became known commonly as the "Château Tuck".

==== Château d'Argenteuil ====
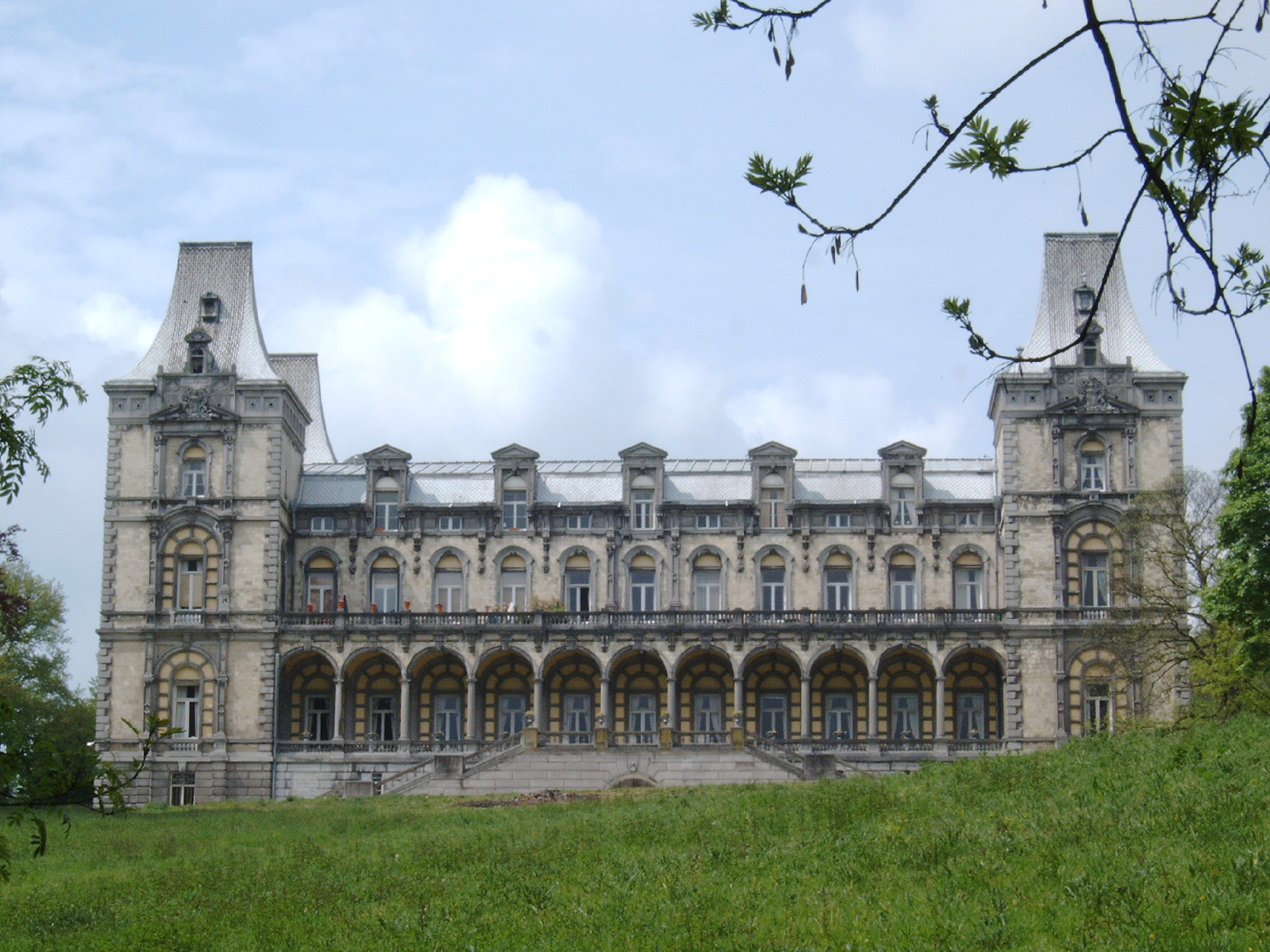
Château d'Argenteuil

In 1940, the Château d'Argenteuil, 20 hectares of its surrounding lands and a farm were sold to a community of Carmelite Sisters in exchange for their properties in Uccle, Brussels. However, the château was not suited to their needs, and they moved out in 1947. The Belgian government acquired the Château d'Argenteuil in 1949. In 1950, as part of preparations for the 1958 Brussels World's Fair, the Belgian government used the chateau to relocate the French-speaking section of the École normale ménagère et agricole de l'État, an all-female normal school, from Laeken, the site of the exhibition. The château's bedrooms were refitted for boarders. The Belgian government later used the site for various Belgian state school establishments, building dedicated buildings for classrooms on the grounds of the château. In 1990, the Scandinavian School of Brussels, Queen Astrid School, purchased the Château d'Argenteuil and its grounds, and relocated there in 1992. From September 2016, the European School of Bruxelles-Argenteuil began operating on the same site.

==== Château Bellevue ====
In 1949, the Belgian government acquired the Château Bellevue, originally for use by the Belgian national rail company, the SNCB. In 1958 it was used as residence for distinguished visitors to the 1958 World's Fair in Brussels. From 1961 it was the official residence of the Belgian royal family, King Leopold III and his wife Princess Lilian, up until her death in 2003. During discussions on the Treaty establishing a Constitution for Europe there were proposals to turn the château into a residence for the mooted position of the President of the European Union. However, the Belgian government sold the Chateau Bellevue in September 2004.

==== Dames de Berlaymont ====
In 1960, Count Ludovic de Meeûs d'Argenteuil sold thirty hectares of the Argenteuil estate to the Dames de Berlaymont, who had to vacate their properties in Brussels following their acquisition by the Belgian state for the purpose of building a headquarters for the European Commission. The nuns established a new convent and boarding school on the site.

== Public transport ==
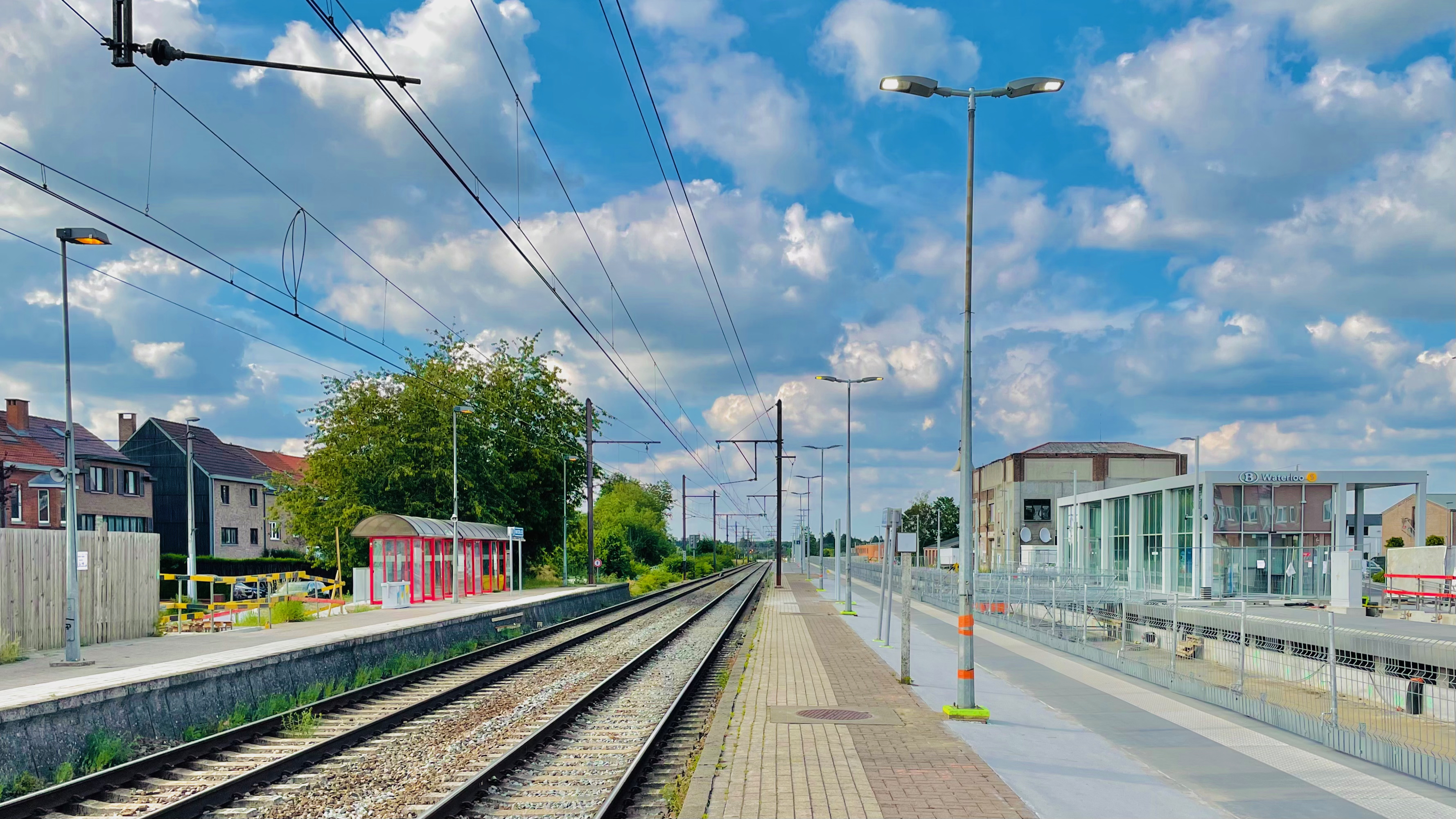
Waterloo railway station

Waterloo railway station was opened on 1 February 1874.

== Sport ==
ASUB Waterloo is a Rugby Union team.

== Notable residents ==
In September 1959 the convent of the Missionary Dominican Sisters of Our Lady of Fichermont in Waterloo, became the home of Jeanne-Paule Marie Deckers, who was later known as "The Singing Nun".

On 2 February 2018, the Belgian commune of Waterloo said that former Catalonia president Carles Puigdemont had rented a villa and planned to establish his official residence there.

== Twin towns – sister cities ==
Waterloo is twinned with:

- Nagakute, Aichi, Japan
- Sekigahara, Gifu, Japan
- Rambouillet, France
- Waterloo, Québec, Canada
- Differdange, Luxembourg
