= Church of Saint Joseph, Waterloo =

Church in Waterloo, Belgium

Coordinates: 50.7175°N 4.3970°E

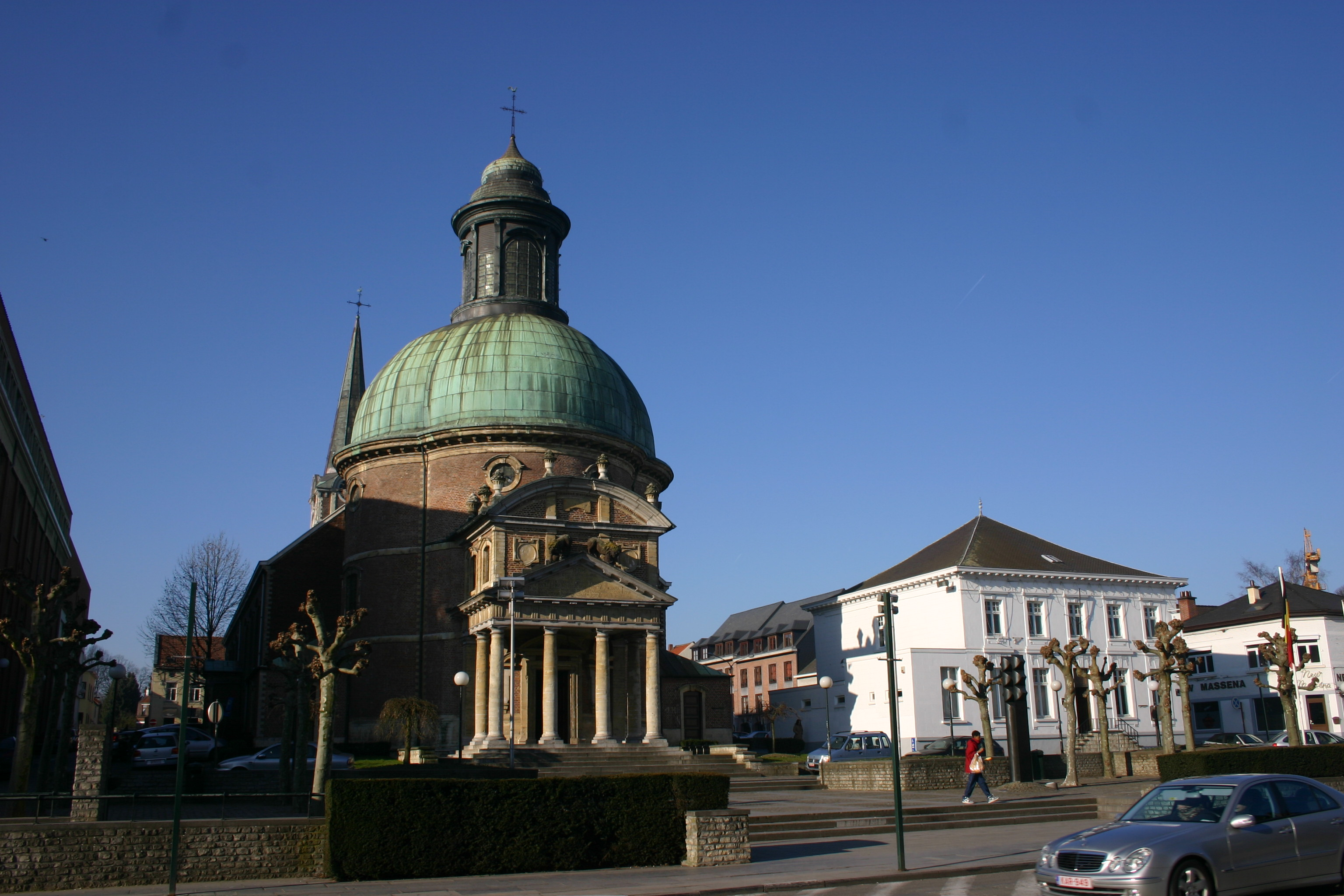
The church and the former presbytery

The Church of St. Joseph (French: Église Saint-Joseph) is an 18th-century church in Waterloo, Belgium, dedicated to Saint Joseph.

== History ==
=== Origins ===
A forest chapel dedicated to Saint Anne was burned down shortly before this church's construction. The inhabitants of Waterloo wished to rebuild it but were prevented from doing so by financial difficulties. The wood-producers in the area paid a tax - every hundredth denier - on their sales to raise money, but even after 20 years the total sum raised was not enough.

The new governor-general of the Spanish Netherlands, Don Francisco Antonio de Agurto, marquis de Gastañaga, then intervened. The marquis decided that building a new chapel on the site dedicated to Saint Joseph (a spiritual model to Agurto's sovereign Charles II) would be a good way of remedying the sickly Charles's continuing and desperate sterility (despite his two marriages he had produced no heir). The ceremony of laying the first stone took place on 26 June 1687, in the presence of the Archbishop of Mechelen. Like all buildings of this era, the edifice's architecture (attributed to the Walloon architect Philippe Delsaux) borrows from the language of French Baroque classicism - a rotonda, a dome and above all a colonnaded portico refer to classical antiquity and give the edifice a wholly royal solemnity. This is reinforced by the presence of two lions on the portico's pediment. It is an imposing monument, in contrast to the modest size of the hamlets which it serves. Inaugurated with great ceremony on 19 February 1690, the marquis's pious intentions had no effect on Charles' sterility or on his own career - he was recalled to Madrid for not defending Mons well enough to prevent its capture by the French.

=== Heyday ===
The hazards of administrative divisions complicated the life of the new royal chapel. Built on the edge of the Sonian Forest, at the place called "petit Waterloo", it depended on the parish of Sint-Genesius-Rode and partly on the Diocese of Mechelen. Most of the hamlet, "grand Waterloo", was within the parish of Braine-l'Alleud, in the Diocese of Namur. To avoid split loyalties, the priest at Braine wanted to merge the chapel into his parish and, despite opposition, he temporarily managed to save the old priest at St. Genesius Rode the long and dangerous trip across the forest. The death of Rode's priest brought the question up again, with the Habsburg government Brussels keeping a firm hand on the nomination of the chapel's rector, since it was a royal foundation paid for by the Spanish government. Despite fierce proposals, the priest at Braine was separated in favour of Guillaume-Albert Le Roy, who had been chaplain for 3 years.

=== French Revolution ===
Shortly after the French Revolution and France's annexation of the southern Netherlands, the royal chapel was sold as state property of the French Republic. An unscrupulous Parisian businessman Thomas Gillet bought it at a knock-down price, having already acquired the neighbouring abbeys of Aywiers and Wauthier-Braine. From then on mass was celebrated secretly in a barn at the farm of Philippe Pastur's widow by the brave abbot Bierlaire, an opponent of the French occupied like most of his Brabançon fellow-priests. To cash in on his investments, the speculator dismantled the buildings and sold the materials, stripping the lead off the royal chapel's roof to sell to army suppliers to make rifle bullets, but local opposition was so strong that he hesitated to continue. In the meantime Napoleon signed the Concordat of 1801 with the pope and Waterloo became an autonomous parish. The town called upon the generosity of its fellow countrymen to buy back the chapel and put it back in religious use. Its first Mass would be held on 10 June 1806.

The building contains several memorial plaques to officers falling at the Battle of Waterloo. In particular, several refer to Restalrig barracks in Edinburgh, home of the Scots Greys who made a famous cavalry charge during the battle.

The baroque building proved too small to accommodate the congregations of up to 1,500 coming to mass here (a first expansion project had already been designed by Louis Montoyer in 1789 shortly before the Revolution). Having for a moment thought of demolishing the chapel anew and rebuilding a church at Mont-Saint-Jean, the idea of expansion resurfaced and was felt to be an easier option, since the town had access to sufficient land to do so. After some time raising gifts and subsidies, the works were completed in 1823 and 1824. A brick hall with a slate roof extended the dome towards the back. Closed off towards the street, it then joined the choir. The masterpieces of church furniture - the pulpit and the massive sculpted-oak communion benches - were recovered from the abbey of the Blanches Dames at Aywier.

Thirty years later, between 1855 and 1858, the structure was again restored and extended, giving it three neo-classical naves, a dome on the west side, and a square brick tower with (from 1899) a 22m high copper spire. The interior was rebuilt in white stone and stucco, with Ionic pilasters supporting a heavy entablature on which were supported the crossed arches of the roof and the calotte of the cupola, lit up by a lantern and six bull's-eyes. The British participated financially in the project. The architects Émile Coulon and Joseph Dumont, major specialists in religious architecture, were brought in. A renowned organ maker called Pierre-Hubert Anneessens added such a good organ that it was sold a century later, in troubled circumstances, by a less scrupulous restorer (it is now in a small church in the southern Netherlands).

=== 20th century ===
Despite the rotonda and portico being named as historic monuments in 1956, the church was in a poor state due to the two World Wars, storms and the first effects of car air-pollution. An urgent intervention project was launched on the 150th anniversary of the nearby Battle of Waterloo in 1965, with British help and led by the descendants of soldiers who fought there. The architect Albert Degand was put in charge of removing the 19th century additions which spoiled the structure, such as the rood screen, commemorative plaques, and the coatings covering the stone. The renovation was completed in 1972 and consecrated the division between the royal chapel and the body of the church. The entry arch towards the church was walled in, leaving only the a glass door evoking the dimensions and frame of the portico.

== The presbytery ==
To the right of the church, the former presbytery (built during the first expansion) shows a beautiful neo-classical façade. The entrepreneur was inspired by Louis Montoyer's plans, archived on the Revolution, to build this hôtel on a square plan, with a set of steps up to it formerly surmounted by a pedimented porch. Falling out of use in 1968 due to its poor state, it housed various associations, community services and even the mayoral office until it was renovated in 1995 to house the tourist federation of the new province of Brabant Wallon. Later when the tourist federation was dismantled, the tourist office for Waterloo and the neighbouring municipalities was established in the building. There is also a museum about the history of the commune of Waterloo on the first floor.

== See also ==
Vander Cruysen, Yves, Waterloo. 70000 ans d'histoires, mai 2017, 24-30.
