= Wellington Museum, Waterloo =

Coordinates: 50°43′03.6″N 04°23′53.5″E

Wellington Museum
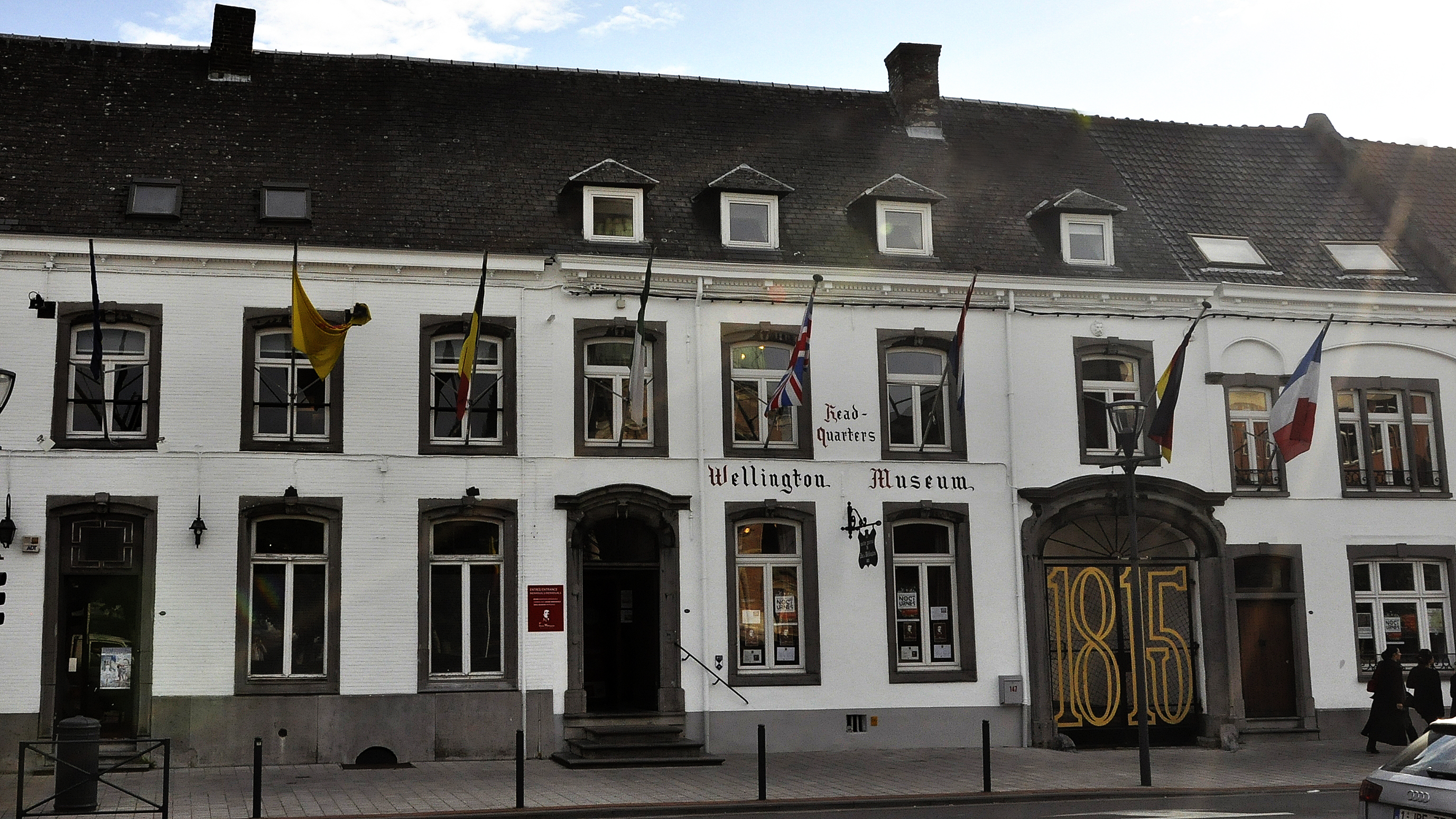
- The Wellington Museum in 2015
- Established: 1954
- Location: Waterloo, Belgium
- Type: War museum
- Website: museewellington.be

The Wellington Museum in Waterloo, Belgium, is located in the house where the Duke of Wellington, spent the night before and after the Battle of Waterloo (18 June 1815).

The museum contains information about the Duke of Wellington, the Waterloo Campaign, the main phases of the Battle of Waterloo a Gallery and contemporary military artifacts from the armies that fought in the battle.

== Gallery ==
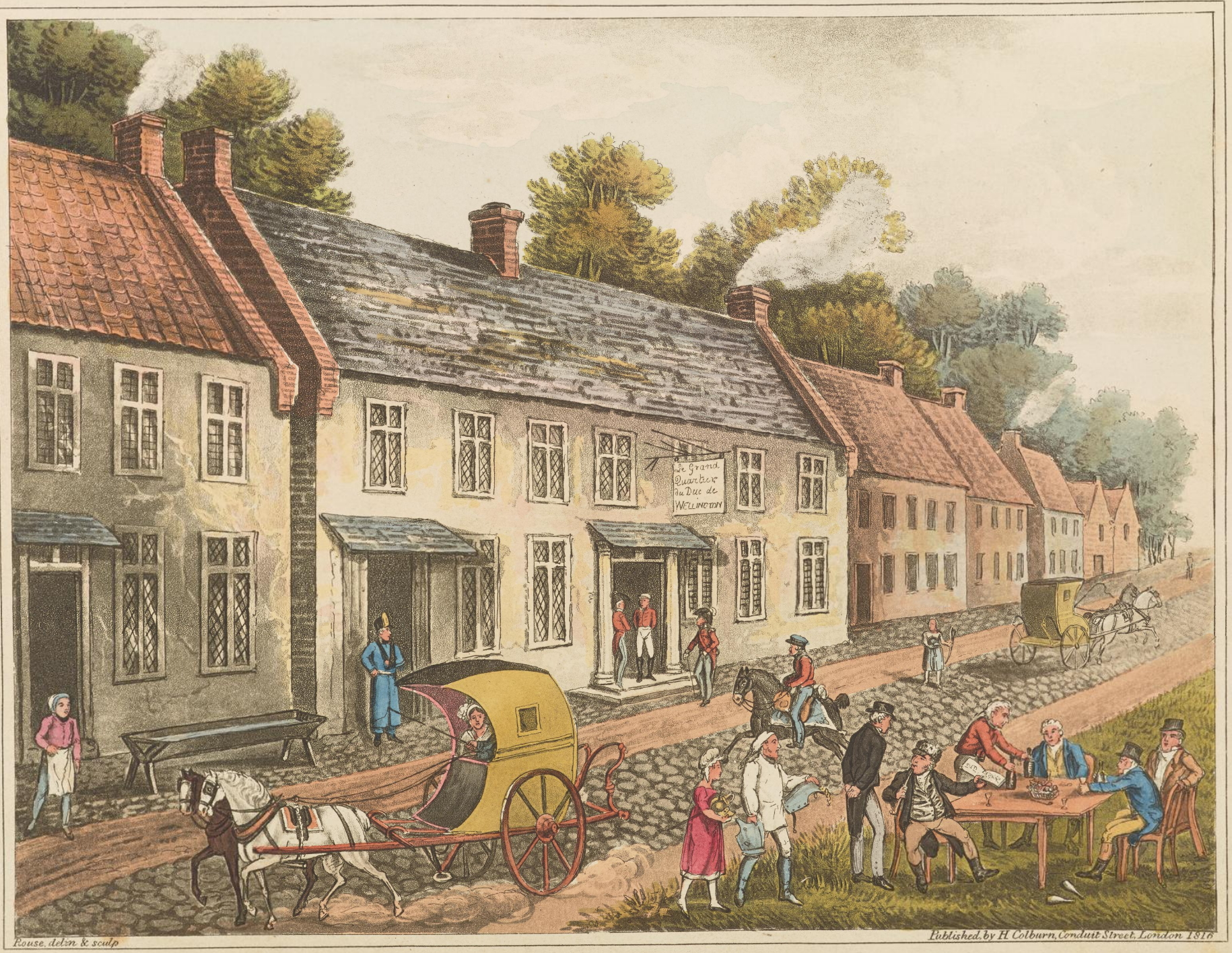
Headquarters of the Duke of Wellington, by C. C. Hamilton (1817)

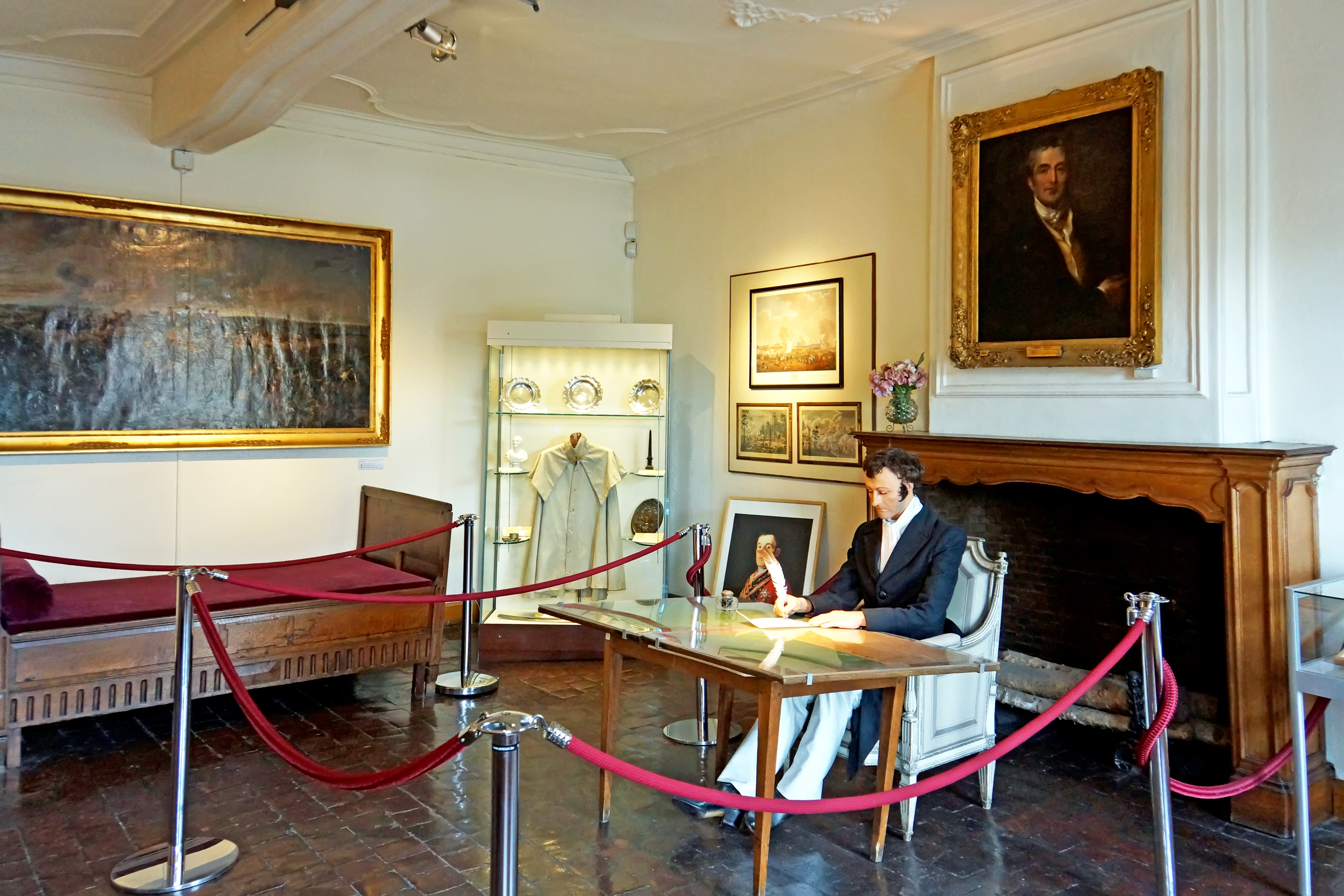
Wellington's Bedroom, where he slept the night before the battle, and wrote his Waterloo dispatch to Lord Bathurst, British Secretary of War, early in the morning after the battle.

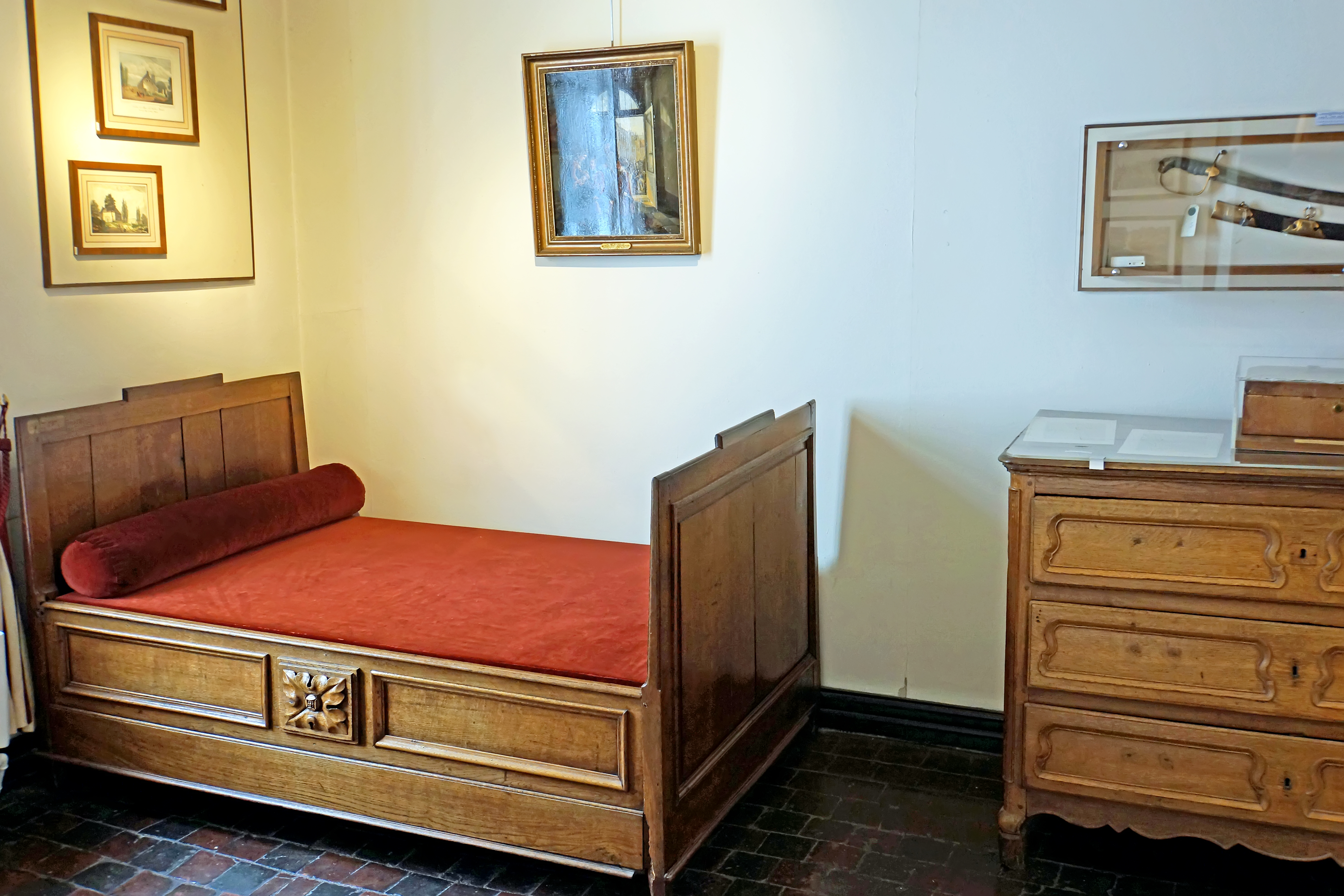
The bed in which the mortally wounded Sir Alexander Gordon died in the evening after the battle.

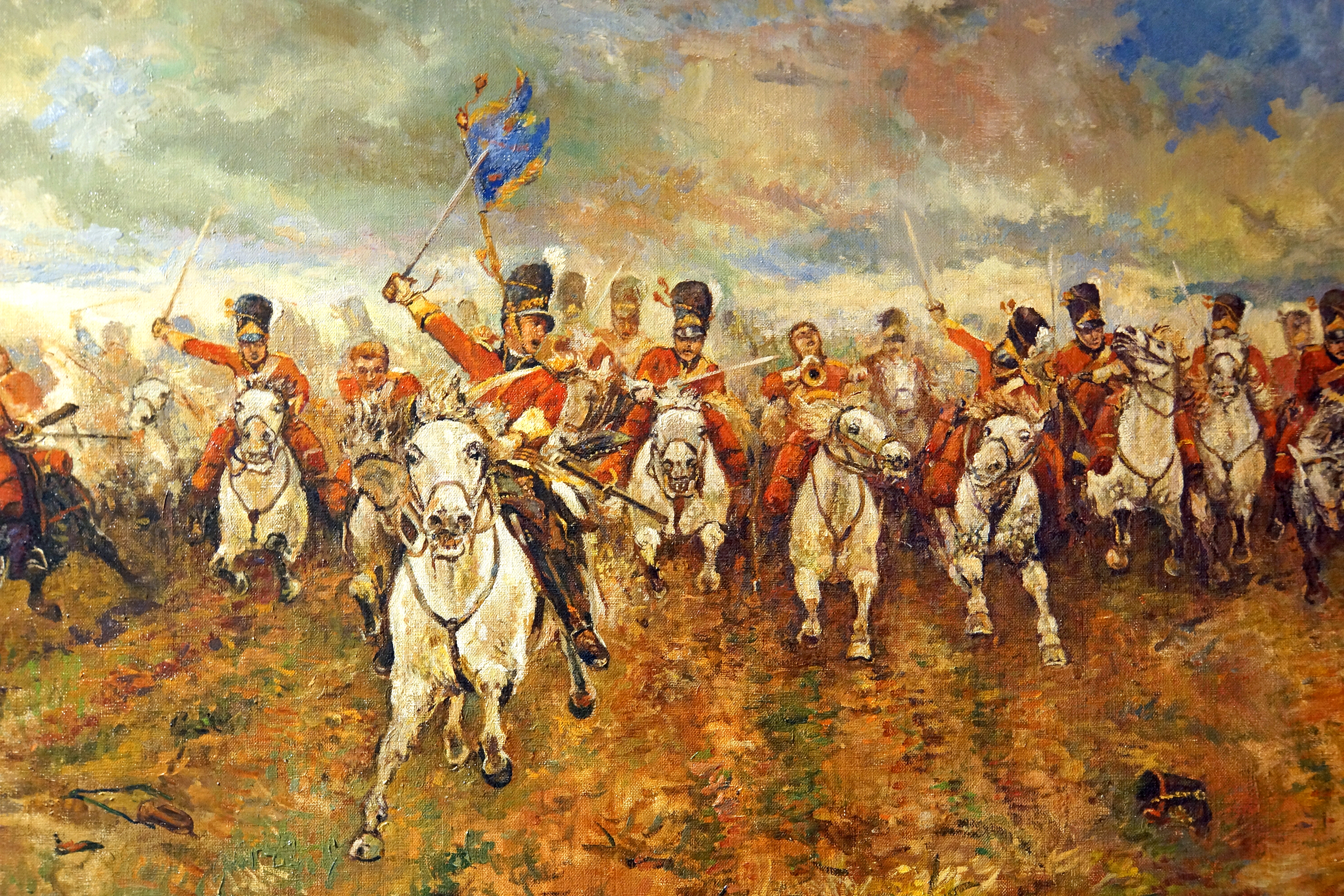
Scotland Forever! by Lady Butler (the original is in Leeds Art Gallery

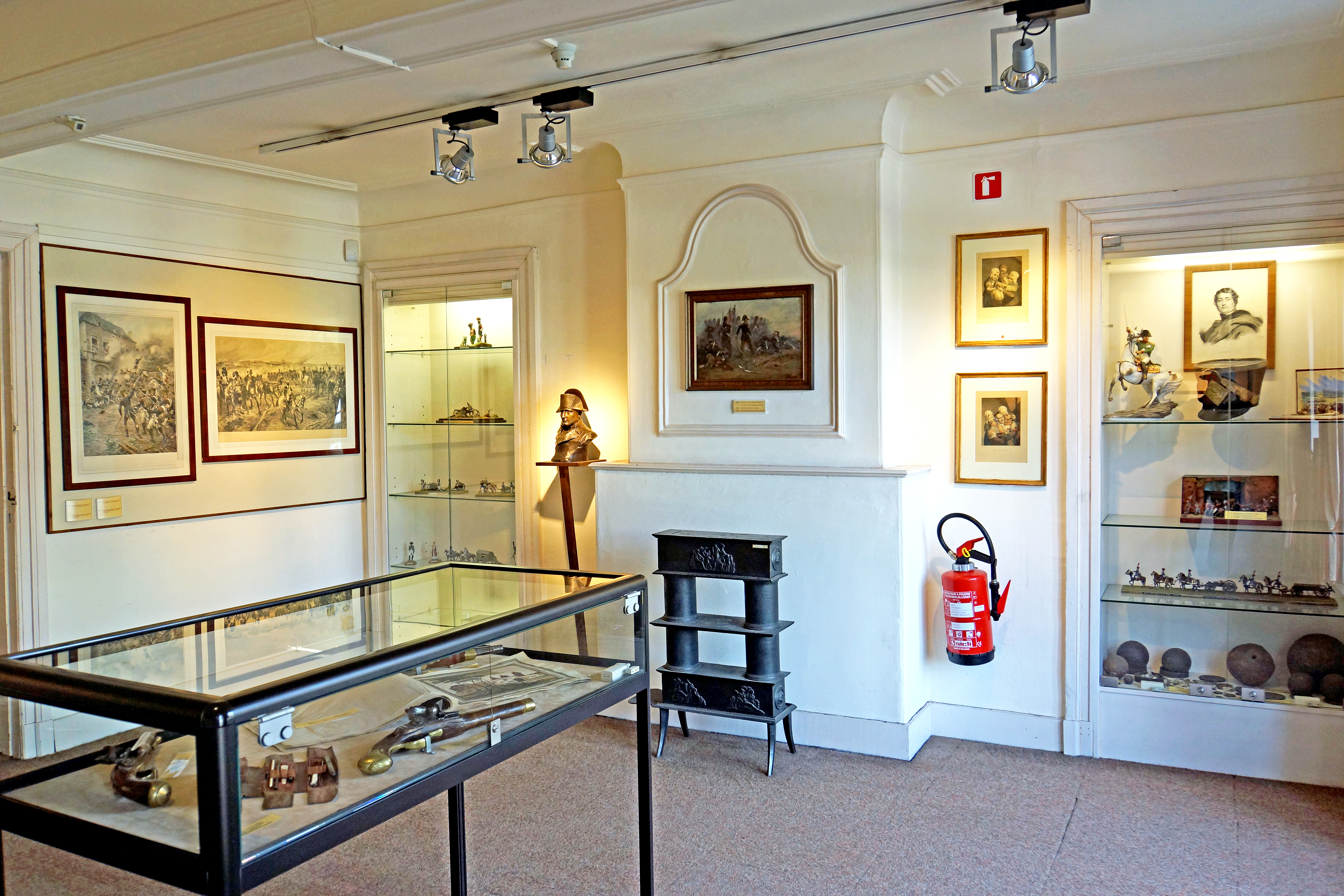
The French room

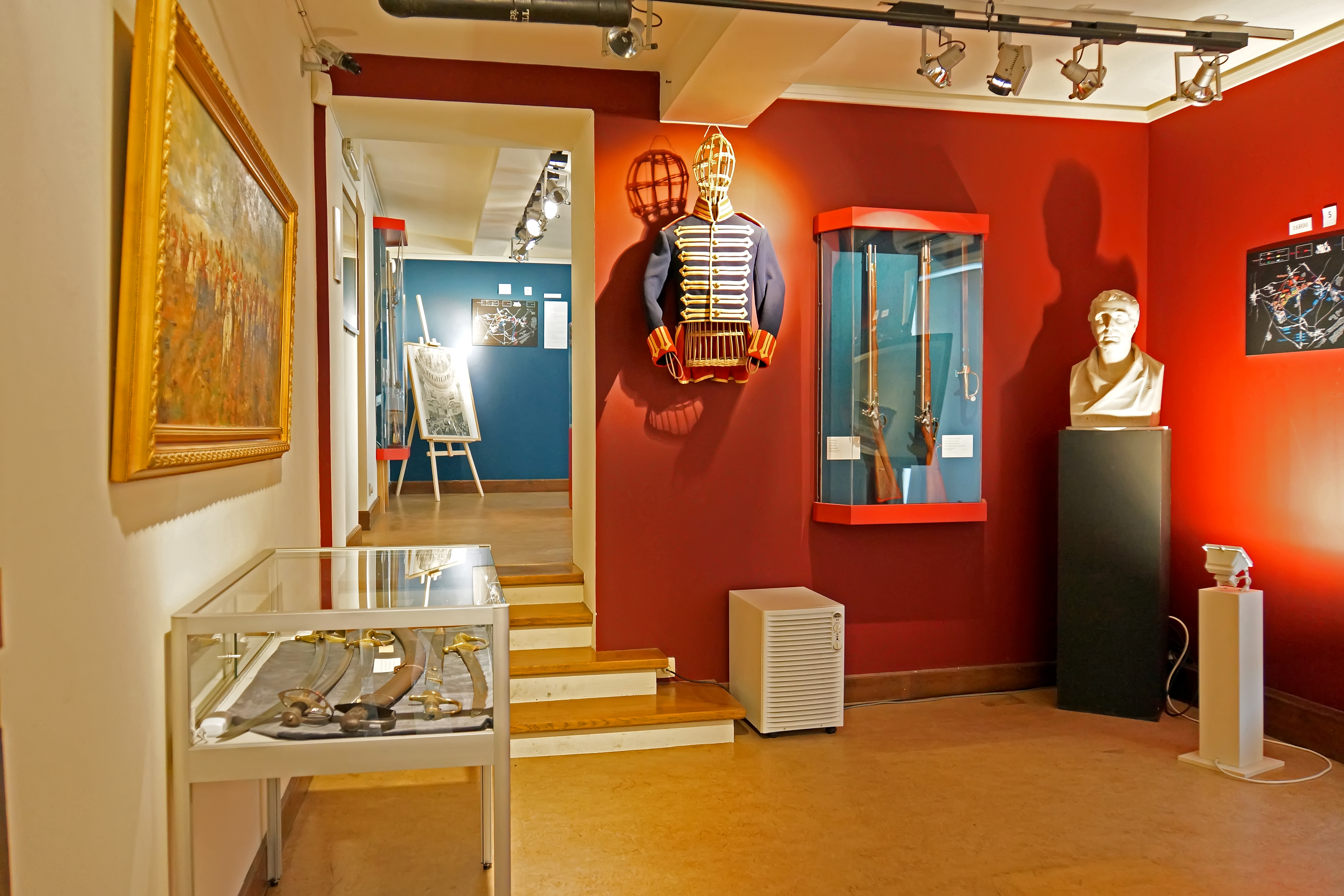
Display room on the second floor

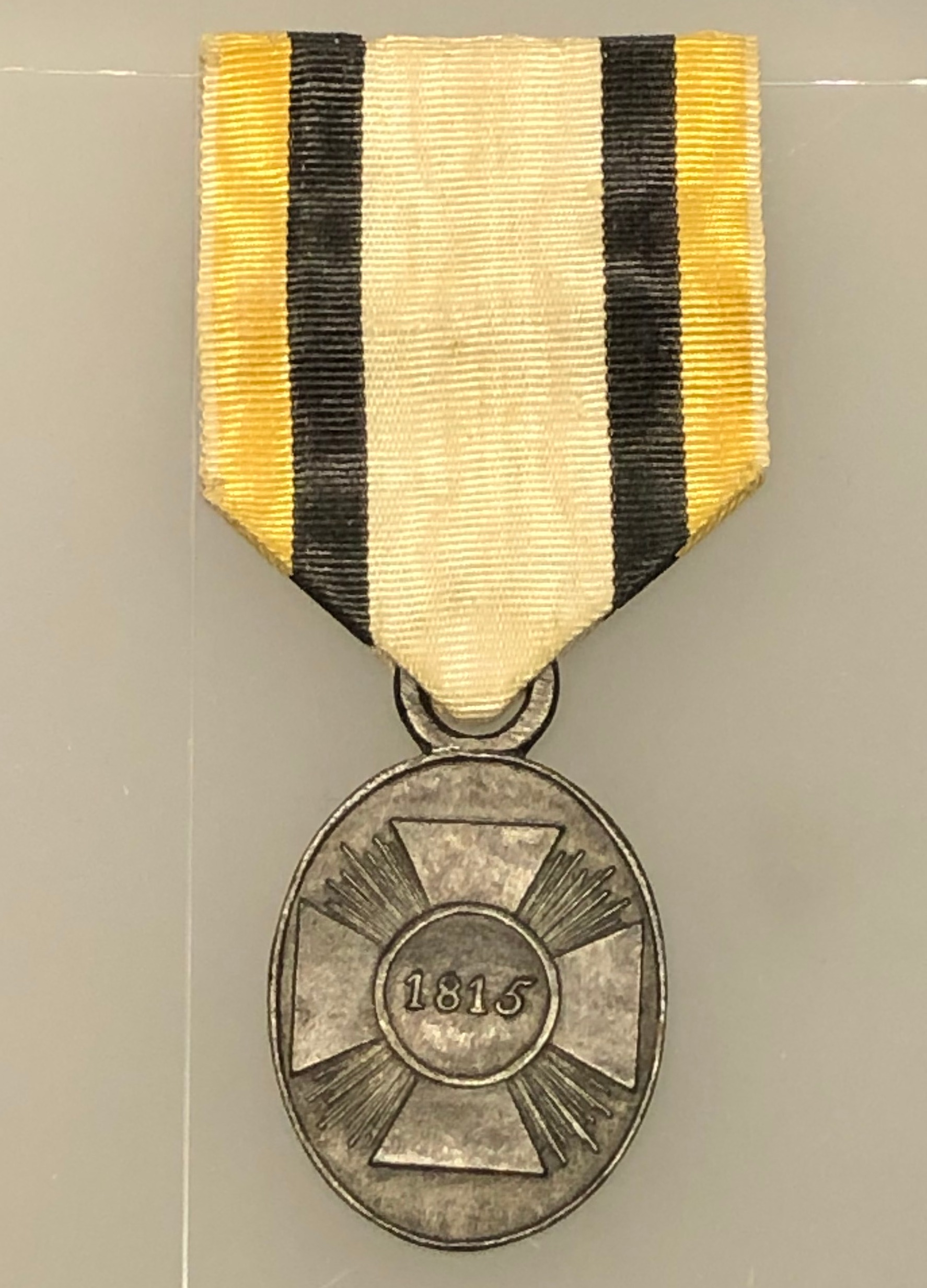
Prussian medal awarded to the non-combattants who took part at the Battle of Waterloo in 1815. Collection of the Wellington Museum, Waterloo.

== See also ==
- List of Waterloo Battlefield locations
