= John Robert Hume =

Scottish surgeon and physician

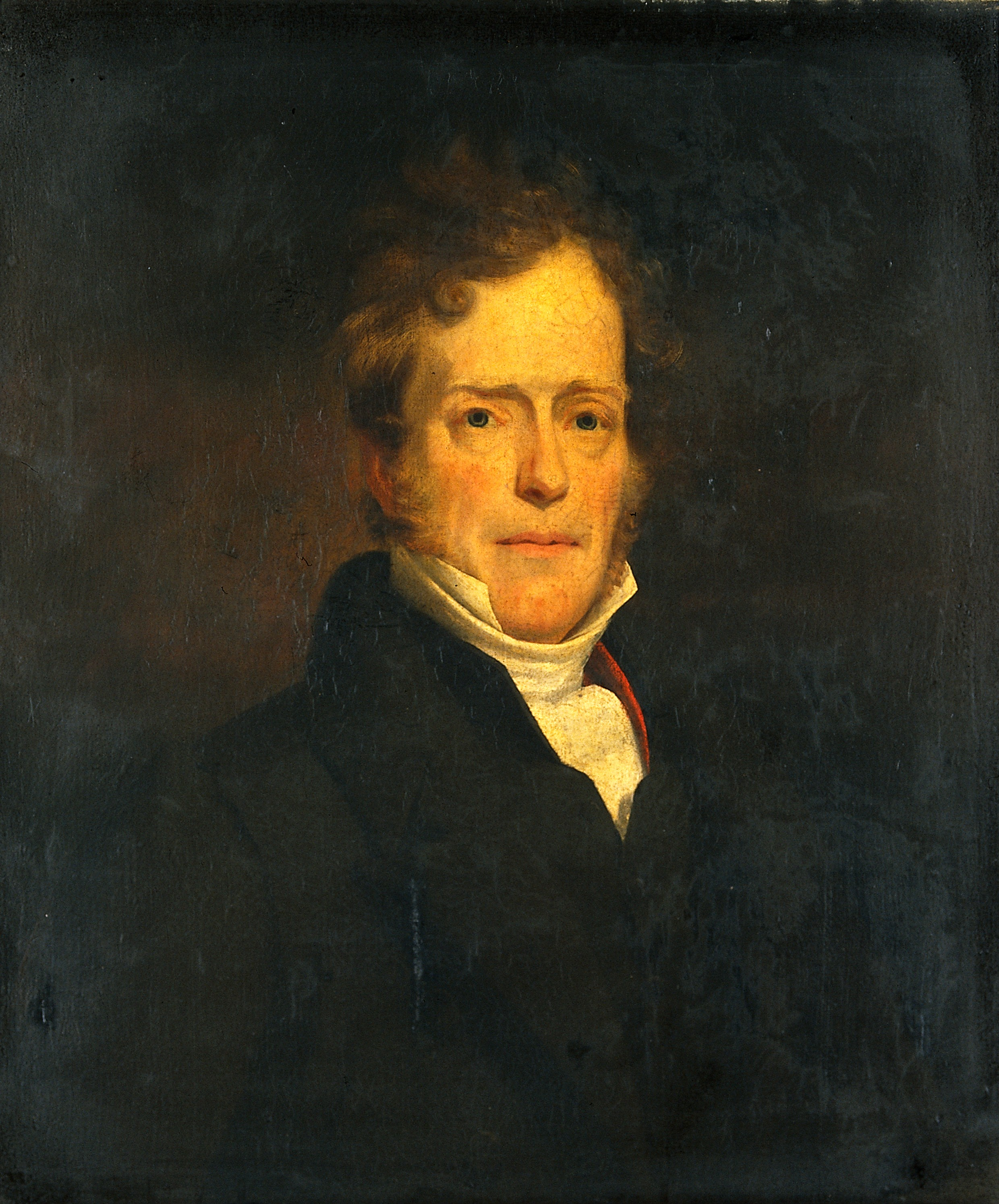
Portrait tentatively identified as John Robert Hume

John Robert Hume (c. 1781–1857) was a Scottish surgeon and physician. He is cited as an example of a 19th-century medical career that arrived at a high position in the profession, without early qualifications.

== Early life and military service ==
Born in Renfrewshire in 1781 or 1782, he was the son of Joseph Hume, a medical practitioner at Hamilton. He studied medicine at Glasgow in 1795, 1798, and at Edinburgh in 1796–7. He entered the medical service of the army as a hospital mate, was in Holland in 1799, and joined the 92nd Regiment of Foot as assistant surgeon in 1800. He was in Egypt in 1801. In that campaign he served as surgeon on HMS Ceres. Some of his journals for his visit to Cyprus (including Larnaka and Limassol) were printed.

Hume served in the Walcheren Expedition in 1809, and the Peninsular War. During that period he was surgeon to Arthur Wellesley.

Hume took part in the 1815 Waterloo campaign, on the medical staff as a deputy inspector. He attended the Duchess of Richmond's ball on 15 June, the eve of the Battle of Quatre Bras. On 18 June, the day of the Battle of Waterloo, he amputated the legs of Sir Alexander Gordon, who died, and of Henry William Paget, 2nd Earl of Uxbridge, out of a number of operations. The following day he awoke the Duke with the casualty list. He also attended the dying William Howe De Lancey.

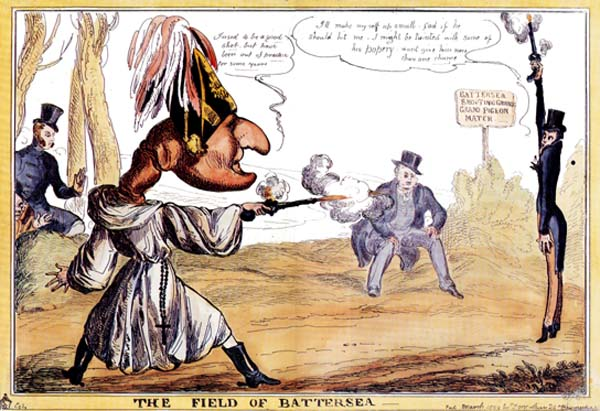
The Field of Battersea, caricature by William Heath of the 1829 duel between Arthur Wellesley, 1st Duke of Wellington (as lobster) and George Finch-Hatton, 10th Earl of Winchilsea; John Robert Hume, as the Duke's friend and physician, sits and spectates.

== Later life ==
The University of St Andrews conferred on Hume the degree of M.D. on 12 January 1816, and on 22 December 1819 he was admitted a licentiate of the Royal College of Physicians. On his own account, he had previously been in France with the Duke of Wellington. From half-pay, he was made an Inspector of Hospitals in 1820.

Settling in London, Hume became personal physician to the Duke. His patients included Marianne Patterson in 1824, shortly to marry the Duke's brother Richard. He travelled with the Duke to St Petersburg in 1826, and was present at the Duke's duel with the Earl of Winchilsea, fought in 1829 as part of the Catholic Emancipation controversy; he produced a detailed account of the duel. He was made a commissioner for the licensing of Middlesex asylums in 1828.

Hume was created D.C.L. at Oxford on 13 June 1834, the Duke being then chancellor of the university. He was admitted a fellow of the College of Physicians on 9 July 1836, and on the following 1 September was appointed one of the metropolitan Commissioners in Lunacy. Following the resignation of William Frederick Chambers, Hume at this period also became Examining Physician to the East India Company. He was sufficiently well known to feature in the early writings of the Brontë family.

Hume was attacked and defended in The Lancet of the later 1840s, with other commissioners of lunacy, accused of being bedridden with gout, and a "sinecurist"; though he was active in inspections. He subsequently became inspector general of hospitals, and was made C.B. 16 August 1850. He died at his house in Curzon Street, Mayfair, London, on 1 March 1857, aged 75.

== Family ==
Hume married Elizabeth, daughter of David Limond, at Ayr on 1 July 1804. Their daughter Elizabeth married Archibald Campbell of Glendaruel.
