= Alexander Gordon (British Army officer, born 1786) =

British staff officer

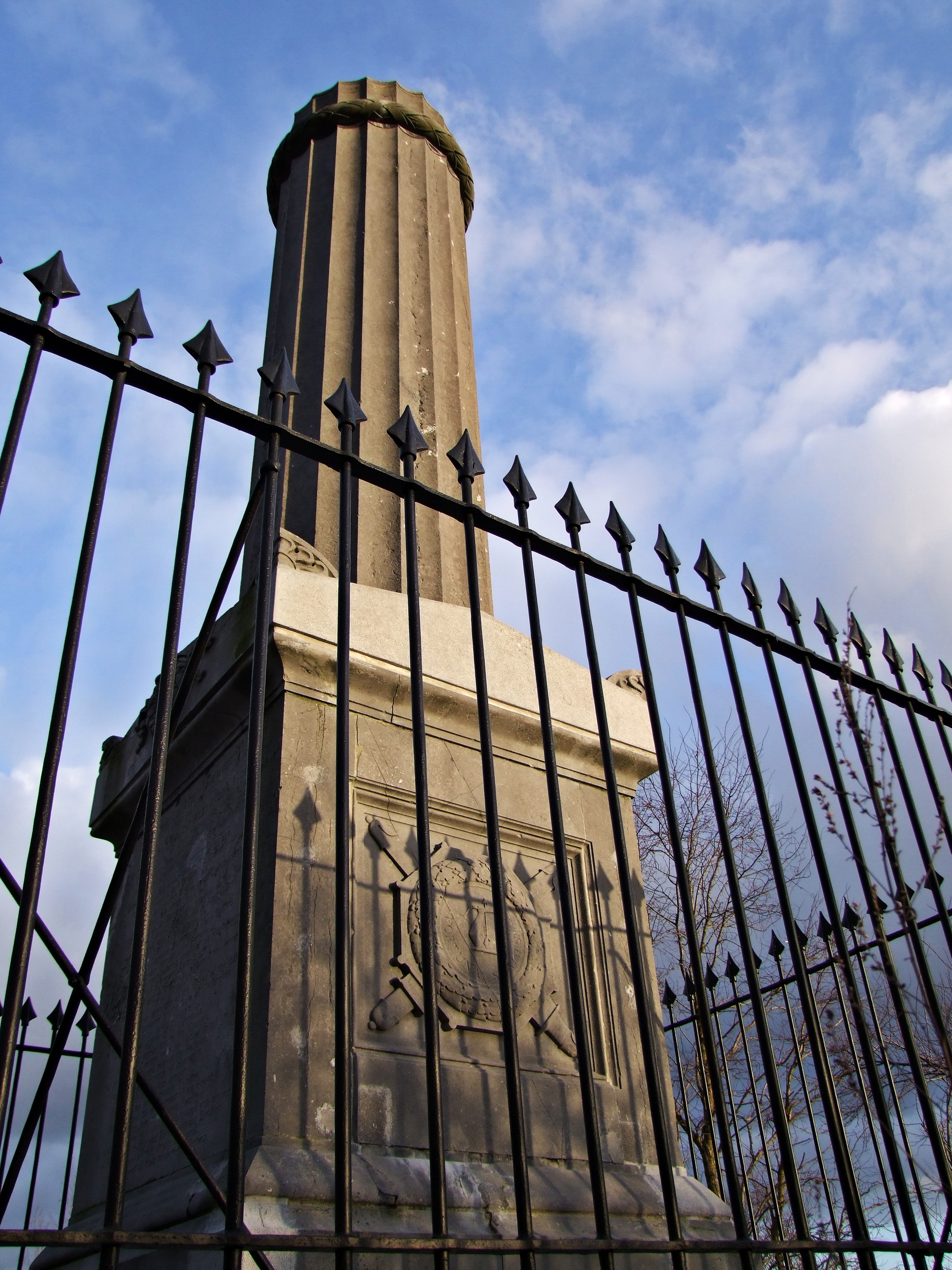
Monument to the memory of Gordon on the Waterloo battlefield. The designer was John Papworth

Lieutenant-Colonel Sir Alexander Gordon KCB (1786 – 18 June 1815) was a Scottish officer in the British Army who was killed at the Battle of Waterloo. (Note: Not to be confused with Alexander Gordon (1781–1873), an illegitimate son of this man's grandfather who was also a British officer in the Peninsular War.(Muir 2003, p. viii)) His correspondence was collated and published early in the early 21st century.

== Life ==
Gordon was the third son of George Gordon, Lord Haddo, son of George Gordon, 3rd Earl of Aberdeen, and Charlotte Baird. His brothers were Prime Minister George Hamilton-Gordon, 4th Earl of Aberdeen, and Sir Robert Gordon. He joined the military campaign against Napoleon during the Battle of Corunna in 1808 as the Aide-de-camp to his uncle, General Sir David Baird, 1st Baronet. He then became ADC to Arthur Wellesley, 1st Duke of Wellington for the next six years, until he was killed at Waterloo.

== Military ==
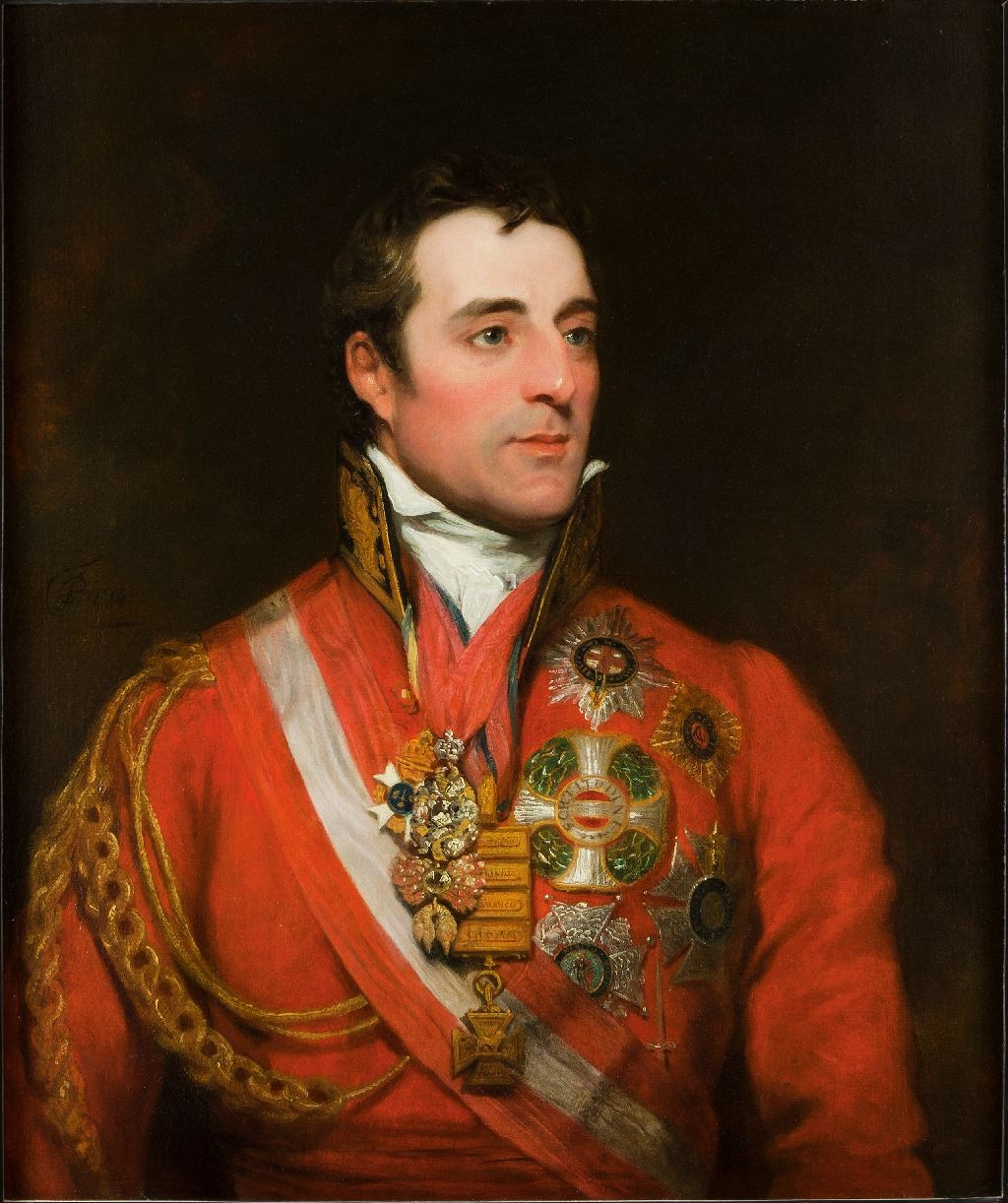
Portrait of the Duke of Wellington by Thomas Phillips. Gordon served under Wellington during the Peninsular War and Waterloo campaign.

Gordon received brevet promotions to Major and Lieutenant-Colonel as a reward for carrying to London despatches announcing victory, first at the Battle of Corunna and then at Ciudad Rodrigo. After Bonaparte's exile to Elba in 1814, Gordon was made a KCB. He was mortally wounded at Waterloo while rallying Brunswickers near La Haye Sainte, and died in Wellington's own camp bed in his headquarters during the night.

The following is an account by John Robert Hume who was visiting the Duke of Wellington after the Battle of Waterloo,

I came back from the field of Waterloo with Sir Alexander Gordon, whose leg I was obliged to amputate on the field late in the evening. He died rather unexpectedly in my arms about half-past three in the morning on the 19th. I was hesitating about disturbing the Duke, when Sir Charles Brooke-Vere came. He wished to take his orders about the movement of the troops. I went upstairs and tapped gently at the door, when he told me to come in. He had as usual taken off his clothes but had not washed himself. As I entered, he sat up in bed, his face covered in the dust and sweat of the previous day, and extended his hand to me, which I took and held in mine, whilst I told him of Gordon's death, and of such of the casualties as had come to my knowledge. He was much affected. I felt tears dropping fast upon my hand and looking towards him, saw them chasing one another in furrows over his dusty cheeks. He brushed them suddenly away with his left hand, and said to me in a voice tremulous with emotion, "Well, thank God, I don't know what it is to lose a battle; but certainly nothing can be more painful than to gain one with the loss of so many of one's friends

— Dr Hume, Waterloo, 19th June, 1815,

Wellington wrote to Lord Aberdeen after his brother's death,

My Dear Lord,

You will readily give me credit to the existence of extreme grief with which I announce to you the death of your gallant brother, in consequence of a wound received in our great battle of yesterday.

He had served me most zealously and usefully for many years, and on many trying occasions; but he had never rendered himself more useful and had never distinguished himself more, than in our late actions.

He received the wound which occasioned his death when rallying one of the Brunswick battalions which was shaking a little; and he had lived long enough to be informed by myself of the glorious result of our actions, to which he had so much contributed by his active zealous assistance.

I cannot express to you the regret and sorrow with which I look round me, and contemplate the loss with which I have sustained, particularly in your brother. The glory resulting from such actions, so dearly bought, is no consolation to me, and I cannot suggest it as any to you and his friends; but I hope that it may be expected that this last one has been so decisive, as that no doubt remains that our exertions and our individual losses will be rewarded by the early attainment of our just object. It is then the glory of the actions in which our friends and relations have fallen will be some consolation for their loss.

— Believe me &c Wellington, Bruxelles, 19th June, 1815,

== Bed ==
The bed in which Gordon died is preserved at the Wellington Museum, Waterloo.

== Monument ==
A monument to Gordon, in the form of a severed column, was erected on the battlefield in 1817.

A monument to Gordon was also erected by his brother at his home at Haddo House in Aberdeenshire.

== Bibliography ==
- Rory Muir, ed. (2003). At Wellington's right hand: the letters of Lieutenant-Colonel Sir Alexander Gordon, 1808-1815 (illustrated ed.). Sutton. ISBN 0-7509-3380-1. "This volume comprises the letters written to his brother, Lord Aberdeen, later foreign secretary, and prime minister during the Crimean war, and Aberdeen’s replies, ... They form an almost continuous narrative of the campaigns, and often reveal more of the thinking behind operations than do the duke’s own despatches".
