= Anne Andrieux =

French volleyball player (born 1979)

Personal information
- Nationality: French
- Born: 21 April 1979 (age 47); Lens, France

Volleyball information
- Position: Outside Hitter
- Number: 12 (National team)

Career
Years	Teams
2005	(France) USSP Albi

National team
2005	France

Anne Andrieux (born 21 April 1979) is a French female former volleyball player. She played as an outside hitter and was part of the France women's national volleyball team.

She competed at the 2001 European Championships. On club level she played for USSP Albi in 2005.
