= Mathuren Arthur Andrieu =

French painter

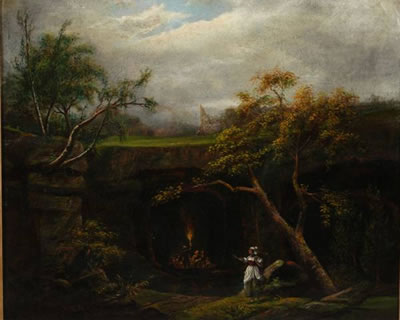
Landscape with figures

Mathurin or Mathurin Arthur Andrieu (1822 – 1896) was a French painter. His work included portraits, landscapes, scenery, and panoramas.

He was born in Bordeaux, and studied at the French Royal Academy. He then came to the United States, being employed in New Orleans around 1840. In 1851, he had an exhibit displaying a series of dissolving views of London, the Crystal Palace, and New Orleans at Charleston, South Carolina. In 1853, he exhibited panoramas of St. Louis, Missouri and "Southern Life" in St. Louis.

He married Martha A. Walling in Georgia in 1852. He worked in Macon, Georgia in 1855, settling in Providence, Rhode Island in 1862. He died there in 1896.
