= Renatus Andrieux =

French Jesuit

Renatus Andrieux, SJ (1742–1792) was a French Jesuit. He was one of the victims of the September Massacres, beatified in 1926.

== Sources ==
- Blessed René-Marie Andrieux
