= Émile Andrieu =

Belgian footballer (1881–1955)

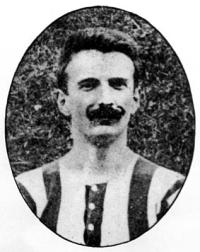
- Andrieu in 1910

Personal information
- Date of birth: 1 February 1881
- Place of birth: Saint-Gilles, Belgium
- Date of death: 5 May 1955 (aged 74)
- Position: Defender

Senior career*
Years	Team	Apps	(Gls)
1900–1913	Racing Club Bruxelles		

International career
1905–1913	Belgium	18	(0)
- * Club domestic league appearances and goals

Émile Andrieu (1 February 1881 – 5 May 1955) was a Belgian footballer. He played in 18 matches for the Belgium national football team from 1905 to 1913.

Andrieu won four league titles with his club Racing Club Bruxelles and won the first Belgian Cup with them in 1912.

== Honours ==
- Belgian First Division: 4

1900–01, 1901–02, 1902–03, 1907–08

- Belgian Cup: 1

1911–12
