= Joseph Dumont (architect) =

Belgian neogothic architect (1811 – 1859)

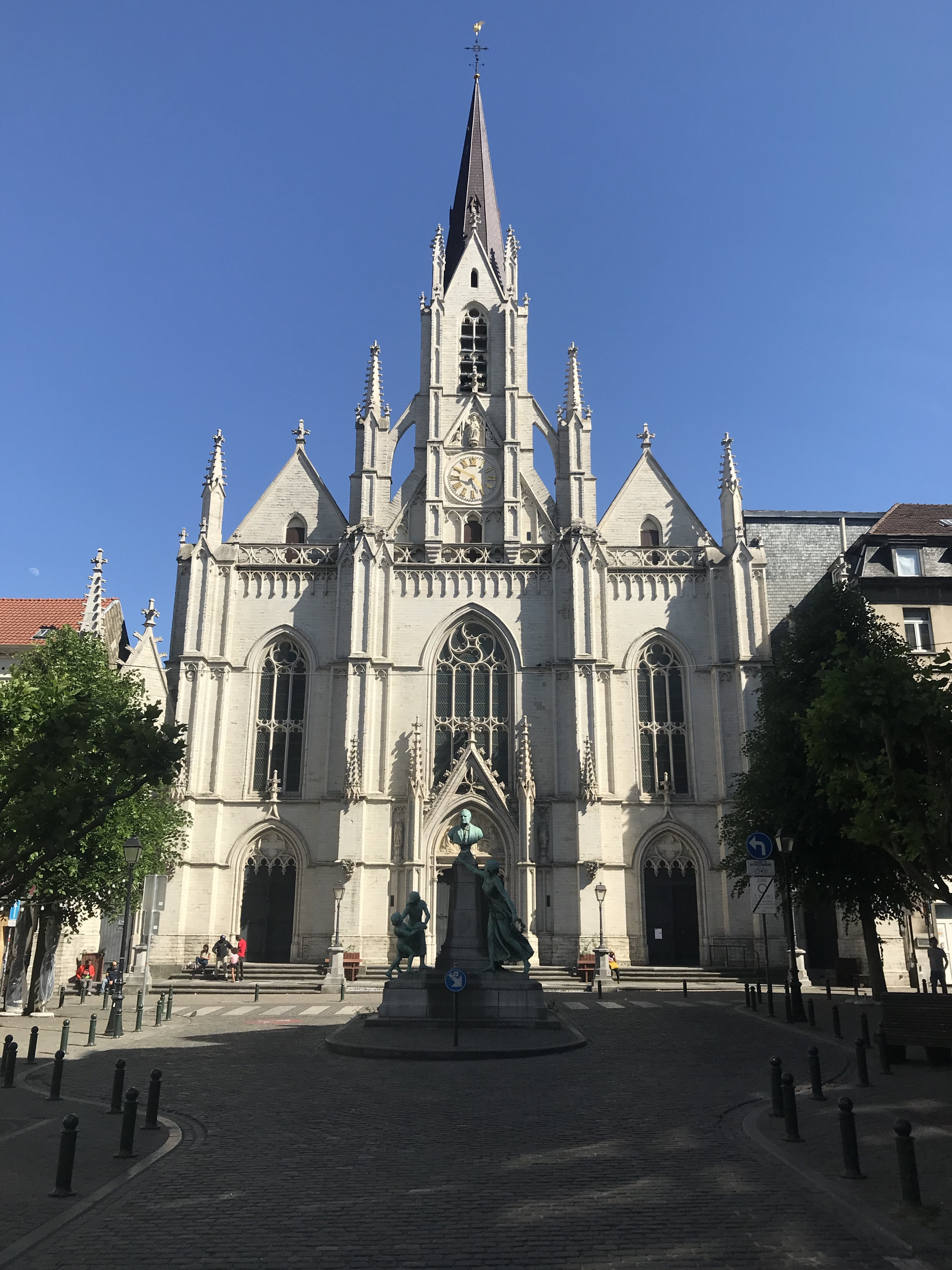
Front of the Church of St Boniface, Ixelles, designed by Dumont in 1845

Joseph Dumont (1811–1859) was a Belgian Neogothic architect who primarily designed and remodelled churches and prisons.

== Life ==
Dumont was born in Düsseldorf, Germany, to Belgian parents. He trained as an architect and was appointed to the Commission royale des Monuments (established 1835). He worked on the restoration of medieval churches in Aarschot, Sint-Truiden, Saint-Hubert, and Nivelles, and of St Martin's Cathedral, Ypres. He designed the church of St Boniface, Ixelles, modern prison cells in Brussels, Liège, Marche, Dinant, and Leuven, and a reformatory at Ruiselede (East Flanders). He designed somewhere in the region of 30 Neogothic churches. He died in Saint-Josse-ten-Noode, Brussels, on 29 March 1859.
