= Clément-Auguste Andrieux =

French artist and illustrator

Clément-Auguste Andrieux (7 December 1829, Paris– 16 May 1880, Samois-sur-Seine) was a French artist and illustrator.

In 1870 Andrieux worked for Le Monde Illustré during the Franco Prussian War.

== Works ==
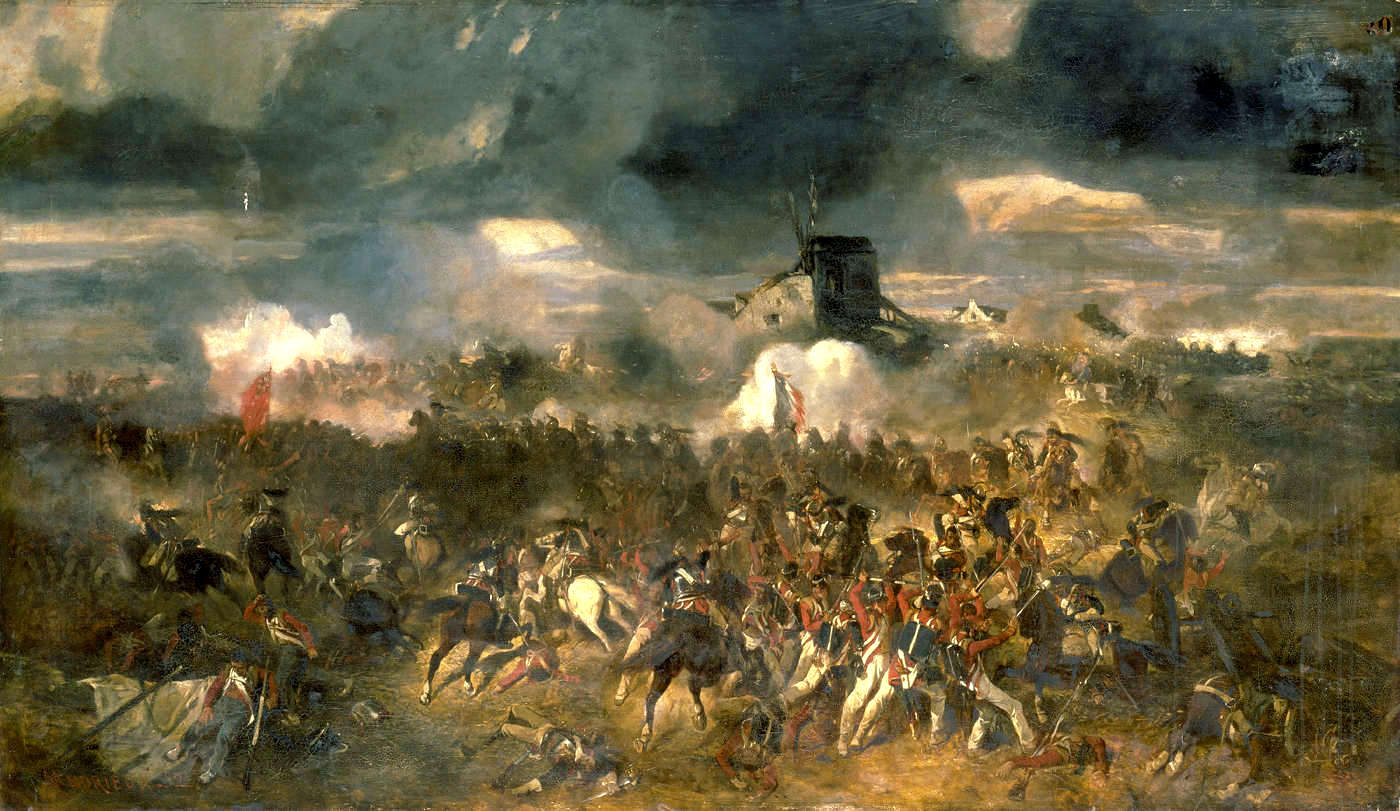
La bataille de Waterloo

- A lithographic series on National Guards.

illustrated

- Cherville, Histoire d'un trop bon chien, Hetzel.
- Harriet Beecher-Stowe, La Case de l'Oncle Tom, Perrotin, 1853.

List of individual drawings and paintings
Work	Date	Notes
Don Quixote Telling His Story to the Peasants	1859	watercolor.
As-tu jamais chassé la grosse bête, toi? (two soldiers talking; "Imp. Auguste Bry")	187-	print (lithograph)
La bataille de Waterloo (Battle of Waterloo)		
Cuirassier leading his horse over a battlefield		Watercolor with Pen and Ink
