= Belgian State Railways Type 12 =

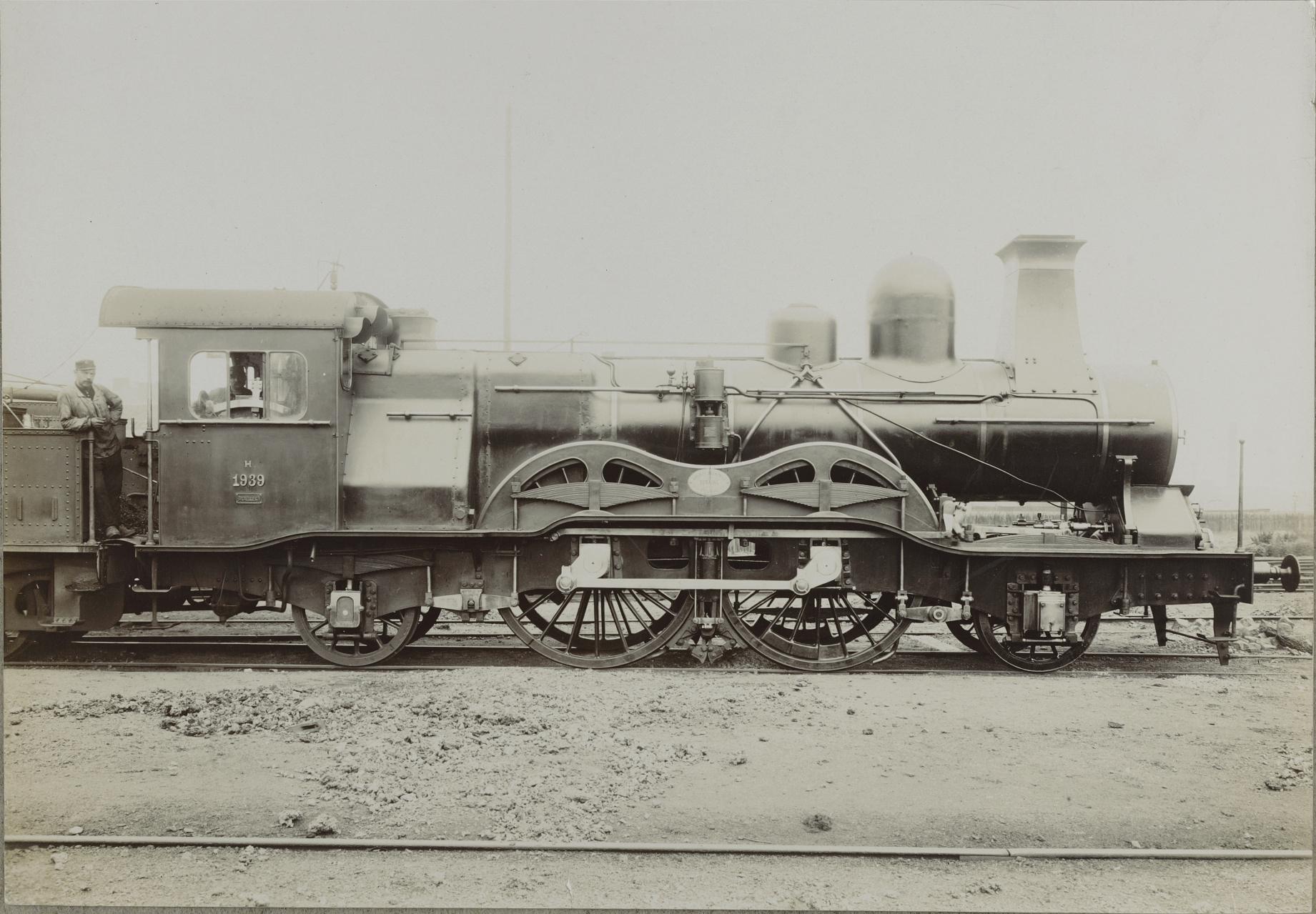
Type and origin
- Power type: Steam
- Build date: 1888–1897
- Total produced: 115
Specifications
- Configuration
  - Whyte: 2-4-2
  - UIC: 1B1 n2
- Gauge: 1,435 mm (4 ft 8 1/2 in)
- Leading dia.: 1,200 mm (3 ft 11 1/4 in)
- Driver dia.: 2,100 mm (6 ft 10 5/8 in)
- Trailing dia.: 1,200 mm (3 ft 11 1/4 in)
- Wheelbase: 6,560 mm (21 ft 6 1/4 in)
- Loco weight: 1888 type: 49.20 t (108,500 lb); 1892 type: 49.70 t (109,600 lb); 1897 type: 51.96 t (114,600 lb)
- Firebox
  - Type: Belpaire
  - Grate area: 4.7071 m^{2} (50.667 sq ft)
- Boiler pressure: 10 atm (1.01 MPa; 147 psi)
- Heating surface: 124.675 m^{2} (1,341.99 sq ft)
- Cylinders: Two, inside
- Cylinder size: 500 mm × 600 mm (19.69 in × 23.62 in)
- Valve gear: Walschaert
Performance figures
- Maximum speed: 110 km/h (68 mph)
- Power output: 850 CV (838 hp; 625 kW)
- Tractive effort: 4,796 kg (10,573 lb)
Career
- Operators: Belgian State Railways
- Class: Type 12

The Belgian State Railways Type 12 was a class of 2-4-2 steam locomotives for express passenger service, introduced in 1888. They were the successors of the Belgian State Railways Type 1 locomotives.

== Construction history ==
The locomotives were built by various manufacturers from 1888 to 1897. The machines had an outside frame with the cylinders and the Walschaert valve gear located inside the frame.

The locomotives used three-axle tenders with a 14 m^{3} (490 cu ft) capacity, as well as two-axle tenders with 9 m^{3} (320 cu ft).

Known production quantities
Manufacturer	Quantity	Type / Years	Note
Cockerill	28	1885–1888	Belgian State Railways
Tubize	12		Belgian State Railways
Saint-Léonard	15	1891–1896	Belgian State Railways
Couillet	10		Belgian State Railways
Franco-Belge	5	1893–1895	Belgian State Railways
Haine-Saint-Pierre	13	1892–1897	Belgian State Railways
La Meuse	14	1888–1898	Belgian State Railways, one with Durant-Lencauchez valve gear
Carels Frères	8		Belgian State Railways
