= Belgian State Railways Type 11 =

Class of 102 Belgian 0-6-0T locomotives

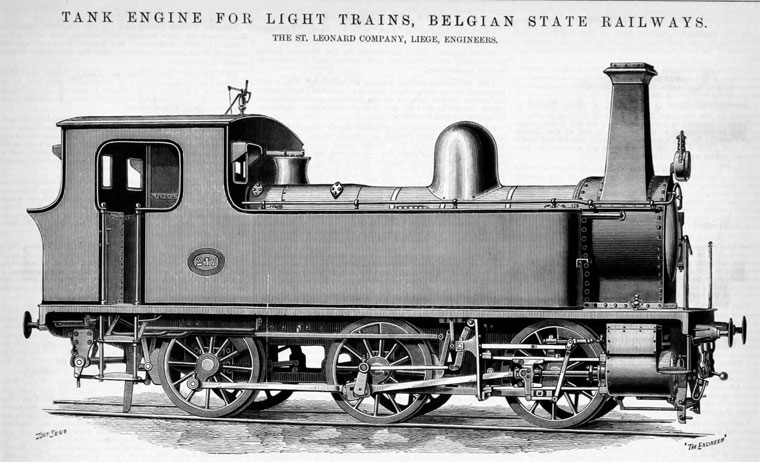
Type and origin
- Power type: Steam
- Build date: 1888–1897
- Total produced: 102
Specifications
- Configuration
  - Whyte: 0-6-0T
  - UIC: C n2t
- Gauge: 1,435 mm (4 ft 8 1/2 in)
- Driver dia.: 1,200 mm (3 ft 11 1/4 in)
- Wheelbase: 4.00 m (13 ft 1 1/2 in)
- Length: 8.287 m (27 ft 2 1/4 in)
- Axle load: 10.7–11.79 t (23,600–26,000 lb)
  - 1st coupled: 10.2–10.97 t (22,500–24,200 lb)
  - 2nd coupled: 10.7–11.79 t (23,600–26,000 lb)
  - 3rd coupled: 9.8–11.15 t (21,600–24,600 lb)
- Loco weight: 30.7–33.91 t (67,700–74,800 lb)
- Fuel capacity: 1,200 kg (2,650 lb)
- Water cap.: 4,000 L (880 imp gal; 1,060 US gal)
- Firebox
  - Type: Belpaire
  - Grate area: 2.0647 m^{2} (22.224 sq ft)
- Boiler pressure: 11 atm (1.11 MPa; 162 psi)
- Heating surface: 52.9397 m^{2} (569.838 sq ft)
- Cylinders: Two, outside
- Cylinder size: 350 mm × 500 mm (13.78 in × 19.69 in)
- Valve gear: Walschaert
Performance figures
- Tractive effort: 3,768 kg (8,307 lb)
Career
- Operators: Belgian State Railways
- Class: Type 11

The Belgian State Railways Type 11 was a class of 0-6-0T steam locomotives for local passenger traffic, introduced in 1888. It gradually replaced the Type 5 in this role.

== Construction history ==
The locomotives were built by various manufacturers from 1888 to 1897. The machines had an inside frame and outside cylinders and a Walschaert valve gear.

Known production quantities
Manufacturer	Numbers	Quantity	Years	Note
Saint-Léonard	778	1	1888	État Belge No. 200 (prototype)
Saint-Léonard	781–785	5	1888	État Belge
Saint-Léonard	1057–1062	6	1897	État Belge
La Meuse		6		État Belge
Tubize	720–724	5	1888	État Belge No. 358, 390, 399, 100, 415
Tubize	869–871	3	1892–1893	État Belge
Couillet		13	1888	État Belge
Franco-Belge		5	1888	État Belge
Haine-Saint-Pierre		3	1888	État Belge
Carels Frères		13		État Belge
Boussu		1	1897	État Belge
Zimmermann-Hanrez		37	1888–1898	État Belge

== Bibliography ==
- Tordeur, Emile (1909). Le Machiniste des Chemins de Fer Belges (in French).
- Dambly, Phil (Dec 1966). "Nos inoubliables vapeurs - Cinquième période, 1884-1898 – Régime Masui et Belpaire". Le Rail (in French). No. 124.
- Deghilage (May 1890). "Les locomotives Belges pour voie normale, à l'Exposition Universelle de 1889". Revue générale des chemins de fer (in French). 13, 1er Semestre. Paris: P. Vicq-Dunod: 297–310. OCLC 6536095.
- Morizot (Jul 1898). "Les locomotives des chemins de fer de l'État Belge à l'Exposition de Bruxelles-Tervueren en 1897". Revue générale des chemins de fer et des tramways (in French). 21, 2e Semestre. Paris: P. Vicq-Dunod: 269–291.
- Dagant, André (1974). "Cent vingt-cinq ans de construction de locomotives à vapeur en Belgique". Bulletin de l'Institut archéologique liégeois (in French). 86. Liège: Maison Curtius: 23–244.
- Société de Saint-Léonard (1903). Catalogue de présentation - avec une planche par locomotive (PDF) (in French). Liège.
- Delporte, Luc (9 May 2019). "Locomotive pour train léger (voyageurs) – Tubize type 37 (type 11 EB)". Musée 'de la Porte'.
