= Belgian State Railways Type 1 =

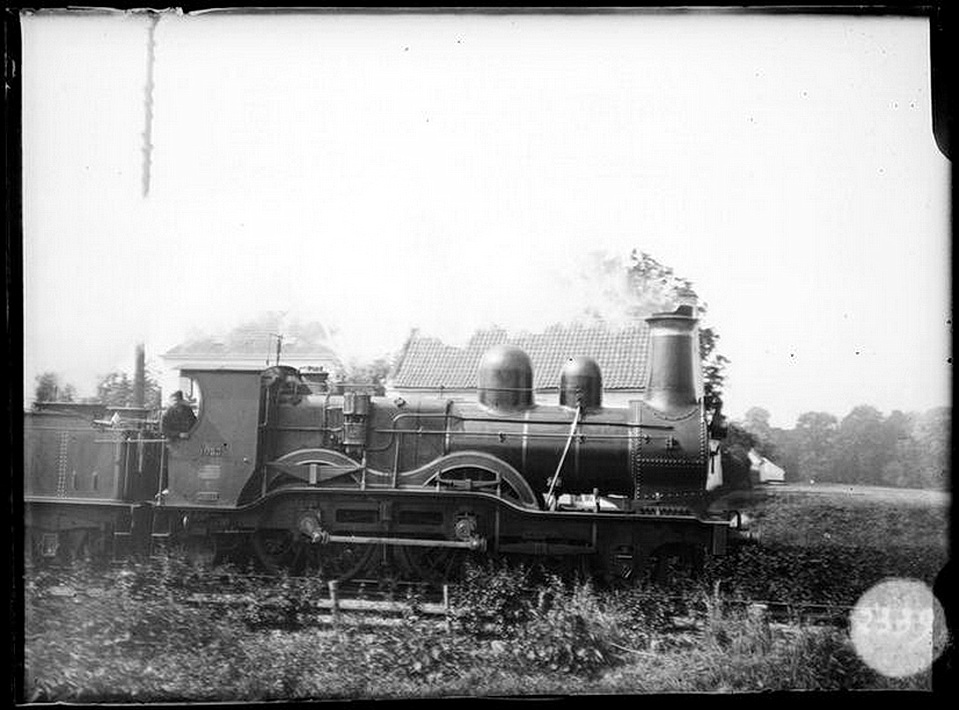
Type and origin
- Power type: Steam
- Build date: 1864–1883
- Total produced: 152
Specifications
- Configuration
  - Whyte: 2-4-0
  - UIC: 1B n2
- Gauge: 1,435 mm (4 ft 8 1/2 in) standard gauge
- Leading dia.: 1,200 mm (47.24 in)
- Driver dia.: 2,000 mm (78.74 in)
- Wheelbase: 4,630 mm (182.28 in)
- Adhesive weight: 22.0–26.4 t (21.7–26.0 long tons; 24.3–29.1 short tons)
- Loco weight: 37.7 t (37.1 long tons; 41.6 short tons)
- Firebox
  - Type: Belpaire
  - Grate area: 2.7927 m^{2} (30.060 sq ft)
- Boiler pressure: 10 atm (1.01 MPa; 147 psi)
- Heating surface: 90.544 m^{2} (974.61 sq ft)
- Cylinders: Two, inside
- Cylinder size: 430 mm × 560 mm (16.93 in × 22.05 in)
- Valve gear: Stephenson
Performance figures
- Maximum speed: 100 km/h (62 mph)
- Power output: 560 CV (552 hp; 412 kW)
Career
- Operators: Belgian State Railways
- Class: Type 1
- Withdrawn: c. 1922

The Belgian State Railways Type 1 was a class of 2-4-0 steam locomotives for passenger service, introduced in 1864.

The class was built by various Belgian manufacturers, with the exception of 9 members built in 1867 by Schneider-Creusot in France.

== Construction history ==
The locomotives were built by various manufacturers from 1864 to 1883. A Belpaire firebox was used and the boiler consisted of three boiler shells. The machines had an outside frame with the cylinders and the Stephenson valve gear located inside the frame.

The design evolved over the years of construction. While first series in 1864 was produced without cabs, they were added in the following series in 1865–1866. On the earlier series the suspension had simple balancing levers between the driving wheels. The engines built by Couillet and Schneider in 1867–1868 used a doorbell mechanism instead of the balancing lever to equalize the suspension forces between the two driving axles and on the last series in 1882 balancing levers between the leading axle and the first driver were used, combined with larger leaf springs on the rear driving axle.

Westinghouse brakes were fitted starting in 1878. The locomotives also received new boilers and new cabs on major overhauls beginning with 1889.

Known production quantities
Manufacturer / Factory numbers	Quantity	Date in service	État Belge numbers / Note
Cockerill 576–580	5	1864–1865	EB 137, 257, 39, 17, 63
Cockerill 585–599	15	1865	EB 291–295, 301–310 (Note: Duplicate assignment of EB 306 (Cockerill No. 595, Carels No. 169))
Cockerill 634–642, 644, 646	11	1866	EB 322–329, 54, 57
Cockerill	4	1867	EB 26, 108, 259, 375
Cockerill 649–655	7	1867	EB 158, 172, 360–364
Cockerill 703, 702, 700, 699, 701	5	1869	EB 441–445 (former SGE 66–70)
Cockerill 741–743	3	1871	EB 21, 38, 66
Cockerill 821–824	4	1872	EB 603–606
Cockerill 848–853, 855–858	10	1873	EB 649–654, 643–646
Couillet 146–150	5	1864	EB 94, 165, 145, 30, 163
Couillet 207–210	4	1868	EB 390–393
Charles Evrard 56–65 (Note: Duplicate assignment of Evrard No. 56 to EB 53 and EB 58)	10–11	1864–1865	EB 53 (and/or 58), 103, 110, 159, 174, 176, 263, 161, 67, 160
Charles Evrard 162–167	6	1871–1872	EB 398–403
Charles Evrard 192–197	6	1873	EB 637–642
Franco-Belge (La Croyère) 413–426	14	1882–1883	EB 1642–1655
Schneider - Le Creusot 1037–1045	9	1867	EB 379–387
Haine-Saint-Pierre 71–74	4	1871	EB 12, 64, 116, 264
Haine-Saint-Pierre	2	1872	Chemins de fer de Chimay
Haine-Saint-Pierre 77–79	3	1872–1873	EB 202, 647–648
Haine-Saint-Pierre 112–116	5	1876	EB 1033–1037
Carels Frères 14–15, 16/20, 21	4–5	1871	EB 135, 139, 100, 147
Carels Frères	2	1871	CF de l'Alsace-Lorraine
Carels Frères 31–40	10	1872–1873	EB 451, 530, 556, 655–660, 681
Carels Frères 122	1	1880	EB 1213
Carels Frères	2	1882	CF de la Flandre-Occidentale
Carels Frères 166–175	10	1882–1873	EB 18, 168, 277, 306, 321, 1517–1521
Saint-Léonard 887, 938	2	1891, 1893	CF de la Flandre-Occidentale

== Service history ==
From 1864 until 1890 the Type 1 was used on the main passenger trains on the major lines of the network, except for the line to Luxembourg. With the advent of the Type 12 in 1888 the machines were deployed to secondary lines. The last locomotives were withdrawn from service in 1921–1926.

== Bibliography ==
- Tordeur, Emile (1909). Le Machiniste des Chemins de Fer Belges (in French).
- Dambly, Phil (Oct 1966). "Nos inoubliables vapeurs - Troisième période, 1864-1884 - Régime Belpaire". Le Rail (in French). No. 122.
- Morandiere, Jules (Jan 1886). "Les locomotives à l'Exposition d'Anvers 1885". Revue générale des chemins de fer (in French). 9, 1er Semestre. Paris: P. Vicq-Dunod: 33–47. OCLC 6536095.
- Vandenberghen, J. (1987). IV. Période Belpaire 1864–1883 (in French). Bruxelles: SNCB.
- Dagant, André (1974). "Cent vingt-cinq ans de construction de locomotives à vapeur en Belgique". Bulletin de l'Institut archéologique liégeois (in French). 86. Liège: Maison Curtius: 23–244.
- Société de Saint-Léonard (1903). Catalogue de présentation - avec une planche par locomotive (PDF) (in French). Liège.
