= Belgian State Railways Type 25 =

Class of 472 Belgian 0-6-0 locomotives

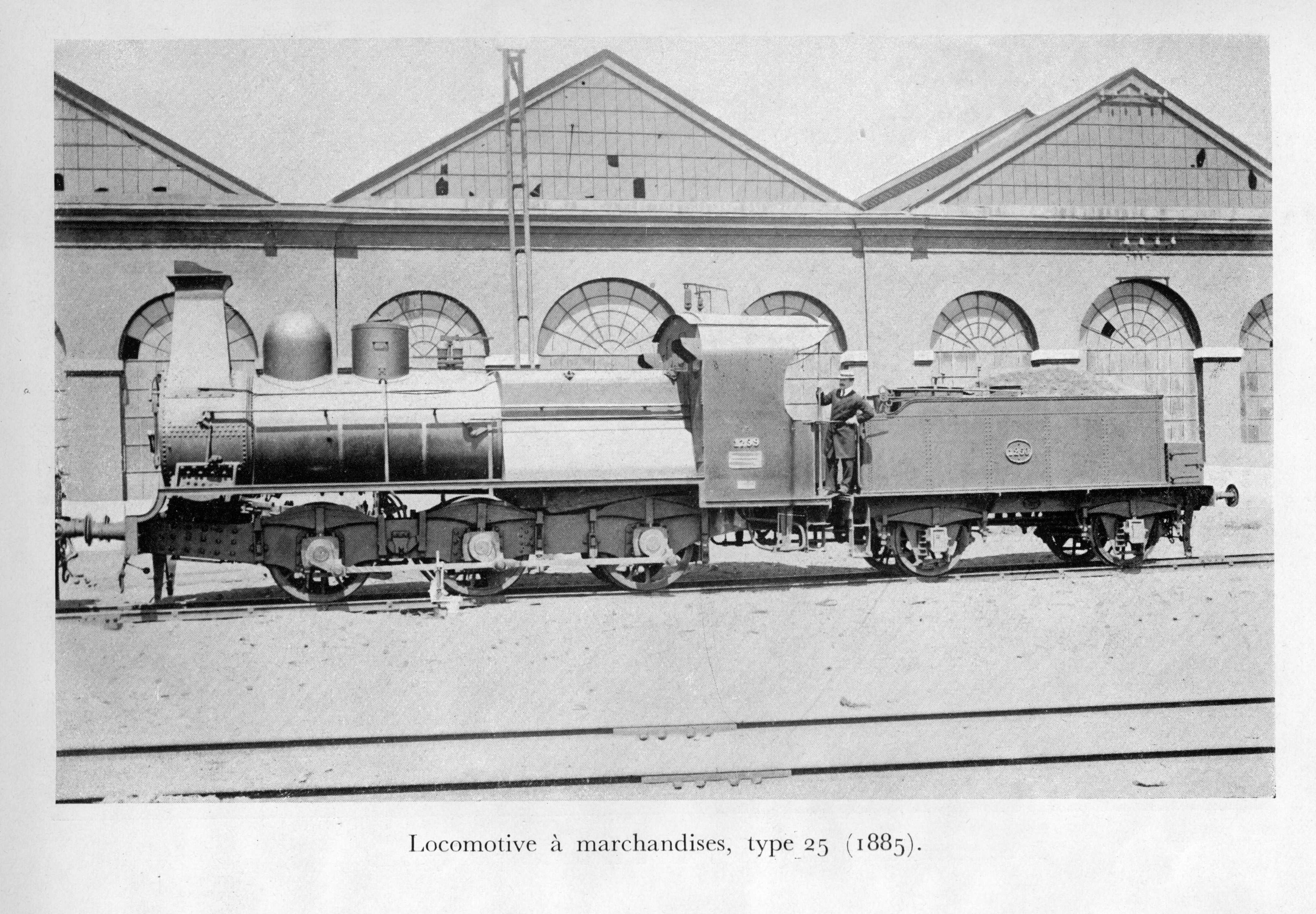
Type and origin
- Power type: Steam
- Build date: 1884–1898
- Total produced: 472
Specifications
- Configuration
  - Whyte: 0-6-0
  - UIC: C n2
- Gauge: 1,435 mm (4 ft 8 1/2 in)
- Driver dia.: 1,300 mm (4 ft 3 1/8 in)
- Wheelbase: 4.20 m (13 ft 9 1/4 in)
  - Axle spacing (Asymmetrical): 2.00 + 2.20 m (6 ft 6 3/4 in + 7 ft 2 1/2 in)
- Length: 9.40 m (30 ft 10 in)
- Loco weight: 46.62 t (102,800 lb)
- Firebox
  - Type: Belpaire
  - Grate area: 5.149 m^{2} (55.42 sq ft)
- Boiler pressure: 10 atm (1.01 MPa; 147 psi)
- Heating surface: 120.636 m^{2} (1,298.52 sq ft)
- Cylinders: Two, inside
- Cylinder size: 500 mm × 600 mm (19.69 in × 23.62 in)
- Valve gear: Walschaert
Performance figures
- Tractive effort: 7,747 kg (17,079 lb)
Career
- Operators: Belgian State Railways
- Class: Type 25
- Nicknames: Charbonnières; Luxembourg marchandises

The Belgian State Railways Type 25 was a class of 0-6-0 steam locomotives for freight service, introduced in 1884.

== Construction history ==
The locomotives were built by various manufacturers from 1884 to 1898. The machines had an outside frame with the cylinders and the Walschaert valve gear located inside the frame.

The locomotives used two-axle tenders with 9 m^{3} (320 cu ft).

Known production quantities
Manufacturer	Quantity	Type / Years
Cockerill	81	
Tubize	58	
Saint-Léonard	49	1884–1898
Couillet	60	1885
Franco-Belge	66	1885
Haine-Saint-Pierre	48	1884–1898
La Meuse	35	1888–1898
Carels Frères	57	
Boussu	8	1897–1898
Zimmermann-Hanrez	11	1885–1897

Known production batches
Manufacturer	Series	Numbers	Quantity
Saint-Léonard	4 N (1884–85)	706 – 712	7
Saint-Léonard	4 N^{2} (1889)	802 – 805	4
Saint-Léonard	4 N^{3} (1890)	843 – 847	5
Saint-Léonard	4 N^{4} (1891)	867 – 871	5
Saint-Léonard	4 N^{5} (1891)	888 – 891	4
Saint-Léonard	4 N^{6} (1895)	987 – 988	2
Saint-Léonard	4 N^{7} (1896)	1036 – 1042	7
Saint-Léonard	4 N^{8} (1897)	1070 – 1072	3
Saint-Léonard	4 N^{9} (1898)	1090 – 1099	10
Saint-Léonard	4 N^{10} (1898)	1123 – 1124	2
