= Belgian State Railways Type 32 =

Class of 502 Belgian 0-6-0 locomotives

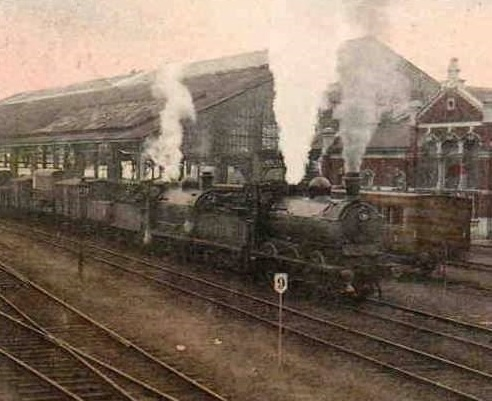
- Type 32S at the Ottignies station, c. 1910.
Type and origin
- Power type: Steam
- Build date: 1902–1910
- Total produced: 502
Specifications
- Configuration
  - Whyte: 0-6-0
  - UIC: C n2
- Gauge: 1,435 mm (4 ft 8 1/2 in)
- Driver dia.: 1,520 mm (4 ft 11 7/8 in)
- Wheelbase: 4.572 m (15 ft 0 in)
- Length: 9.2095 m (30 ft 2 1/2 in)
- Loco weight: 47.6 t (105,000 lb)
- Firebox
  - Grate area: 2.5235 m^{2} (27.163 sq ft)
- Boiler pressure: 13 atm (1.32 MPa; 191 psi)
- Heating surface: 115.4208 m^{2} (1,242.379 sq ft)
- Cylinders: Two, inside
- Cylinder size: 470 mm × 660 mm (18.5 in × 26.0 in)
- Valve gear: Stephenson
Performance figures
- Tractive effort: 8,363 kg (18,437 lb)
Career
- Operators: Belgian State Railways
- Class: Type 32

The Belgian State Railways Type 32 was a class of 0-6-0 steam locomotives for mixed service, introduced in 1902.

== Construction history ==
In total, 502 Type 32 locomotives were built by various manufacturers from 1902 to 1910.

The machines had an inside frame with the cylinders and the Stephenson valve gear also located inside.

From 1905–1913 additionally 307 machines of the Type 32S, a closely related superheated variant, were built. The Type 32S had slightly different dimensions.

Production quantities (Type 32 and Type 32S)
Date ordered	État Belge numbers	Type	Quantity Type 32	Quantity Type 32S	Date in service	Manufacturer / Factory numbers
1901	EB 2893–2911	Type 32	19		1902	Tubize 1287–1305
1901	EB 2912–2925	Type 32	14		1902	Couillet 1338–1351
1901	EB 2926–2941	Type 32	16		1902	Haine-Saint-Pierre 713–728
1901	EB 2942–2953	Type 32	12		1902	Franco-Belge 1394–1405
1901	EB 2954–2966	Type 32	13		1902	La Meuse 1723, 1726–1737
1901	EB 2967–2977	Type 32	11		1902	Carels 390–400
1901	EB 2978–2986	Type 32	9		1902	Énergie 69–77
1901	EB 2987–2992	Type 32	6		1902	Thiriau 19–24
1902	EB 2993–3004	Type 32	12		1903	Cockerill 2406–2417
1902	EB 3005–3012	Type 32	8		1903	Tubize 1330–1337
1902	EB 3013–3032	Type 32	20		1903	Franco-Belge 1406–1425
1902	EB 3033–3050	Type 32	18		1903	Couillet 1354–1371
1902	EB 3051–3067	Type 32	17		1903	La Meuse 1768–1784
1902	EB 3068–3075	Type 32	8		1903	Thiriau 31–38
1902	EB 3076–3081	Type 32	6		1903	Énergie 81–86
1903	EB 3082–3084	Type 32	3		1904	Biesme 16–18
1903	EB 3085–3094	Type 32	10		1904	Franco-Belge 1474–1483
1903	EB 3095–3103	Type 32	9		1904	Saint-Léonard 1383–1391
1903	EB 3104–3112	Type 32	9		1904	Tubize 1392–1400
1903	EB 3113–3116	Type 32	4		1904	Thiriau 45–48
1903	EB 3117–3126	Type 32	10		1904	Couillet 1394–1403
1903	EB 3127–3132	Type 32	6		1904	Carels 422–427
1903	EB 3133–3141	Type 32	9		1904	Cockerill 2470–2478
1904	EB 3142	Type 32	1		1905	Biesme 19
1904	EB 3143	Type 32S		1	1905	Saint-Léonard 1398
1904	EB 3144–3147	Type 32	4		1905	Cockerill 2502–2505
1904	EB 3148	Type 32	1		1905	Biesme 22
1906	EB 3149–3153	Type 32S		5	1905–1906	Franco-Belge 1510–1514
1906	EB 3154–3159	Type 32	6		1906	Haine-Saint-Pierre 873–878
1906	EB 3160–3176	Type 32	17		1906–1907	Cockerill 2543–2550, 2566–2574
1906	EB 3177–3181	Type 32	5		1906	Saint-Léonard 1455–1459
1906	EB 3182–3189	Type 32	8		1906–1907	Énergie 138–145
1906	EB 3401–3416	Type 32S		16	1906–1907	Tubize 1477–1492
1906	EB 3417–3424	Type 32S		8	1906–1907	Couillet 1443–1450
1906	EB 3425–3435	Type 32S		11	1906–1907	Franco-Belge 1611–1621
1906	EB 3436	Type 32S		1	1907	Biesme 31
1906	EB 3437–3444	Type 32S		8	1906–1907	Haine-Saint-Pierre 879–886
1906	EB 3445–3449	Type 32S		5	1906	Saint-Léonard 1450–1454
1906	EB 3450–3458	Type 32	9		1906–1907	Couillet 1432–1436, 1438–1441
1906	EB 3459–3464	Type 32	6		1906	Franco-Belge 1605–1610
1906	EB 3465–3469	Type 32	5		1907	Carels 451–455
1906	EB 3470–3473	Type 32	4		1906–1907	Biesme 27–30
1906	EB 3474–3476	Type 32	3		1906–1907	Gilain 10–12
1906	EB 3477–3478	Type 32	2		1907	Detombay 172–173
1906	EB 3479–3484	Type 32	6		1907	Gilly 280–285
1906	EB 3485–3490	Type 32S		6	1907	Gilain 17–22
1906	EB 3491–3496	Type 32S		6	1907–1908	Biesme 36–41
1906	EB 3497–3506	Type 32S		10	1907	Haine-Saint-Pierre 913–922
1906	EB 3507–3514	Type 32S		8	1907	Carels 462–469
1906	EB 3515–3521	Type 32S		7	1907	Énergie 150–156
1906	EB 3522–3533	Type 32S		12	1908	Franco-Belge 1629–1640
1906	EB 3534–3544	Type 32S		11	1907	Tubize 1509–1519
1906	EB 3545–3550	Type 32	6		1908	Detombay 174–179
1906	EB 3551–3556	Type 32	6		1907	Gilly 299–304
1906	EB 3557–3559	Type 32	3		1907	Énergie 146–148
1906	EB 3560–3565	Type 32	6		1907	Haine-Saint-Pierre 923–928
1906	EB 3566	Type 32	1		1907	Énergie 149
1906	EB 3567–3576	Type 32	10		1907	Cockerill 2612–2621
1906	EB 3577–3588	Type 32	12		1907–1908	Couillet 1462–1473
1906	EB 3589	Type 32	1		1907	Gilly 305
1906	EB 3590–3598	Type 32	9		1907	Saint-Léonard 1489–1497
1906	EB 3599–3604	Type 32	6		1907	Carels 456–461
1907	EB 3605–3617	Type 32	13		1908	Saint-Léonard 1533–1545
1907	EB 3618–3621	Type 32	4		1908	La Meuse 2127–2130
1907	EB 3622–3634	Type 32	13		1908	Cockerill 2660–2672
1907	EB 3635–3647	Type 32	13		1908	Franco-Belge 1707–1719
1907	EB 3648–3668	Type 32	21		1908	Couillet 1479–1499
1907	EB 3669–3674	Type 32	6		1908	Gilly 330–335
1907	EB 3730–3741	Type 32S		12	1908	Haine-Saint-Pierre 959–970
1907	EB 3742–3754	Type 32S		13	1908	Tubize 1549–1561
1907	EB 3755–3769	Type 32S		15	1908	Carels 480–484, 476–479, 470–475
1907	EB 3770–3781	Type 32S		12	1908	Énergie 168–179
1907	EB 3782–3792	Type 32S		11	1908	Thiriau 110–120
1907	EB 3793–3799	Type 32S		7	1908	Biesme 42–48
1907	EB 3800–3805	Type 32S		6	1908	Gilain 23–28
1908	EB 3806–3815	Type 32	10		1909	Saint-Léonard 1593–1602
1908	EB 3816–3828	Type 32	13		1909	Tubize 1595–1607
1908	EB 3829–3840	Type 32	12		1909	Franco-Belge 1793–1804
1908	EB 3841–3846	Type 32	6		1909	Cockerill 2707–2712
1908	EB 3847–3851	Type 32	5		1910	Detombay 185–189
1908	EB 4201–4211	Type 32S		11	1909–1910	Thiriau 137–142, 149–153
1908	EB 4212–4227	Type 32S		16	1909–1910	Carels 485–489, 496–506
1908	EB 4228–4240	Type 32S		13	1909–1910	Énergie 216–228
1908	EB 4241–4246	Type 32S		6	1909–1910	Biesme 53–58
1908	EB 4247–4253	Type 32S		7	1909	Haine-Saint-Pierre 1001–1006, 1030
1908	EB 4254–4272	Type 32S		19	1909–1910	La Meuse 2194–2212
1908	EB 4273–4282	Type 32S		10	1910	Franco-Belge 1805–1814
1908	EB 4283–4285	Type 32S		3	1910	Detombay 190–192
1908	EB 4286–4297	Type 32S		12	1909–1910	Gilain 36–47
1908	EB 4298–4310	Type 32S		13	1909–1910	Gilly 351–363
1909	EB 4311	Type 32S		1	1910	Detombay 193
1912	EB 4312–4316	Type 32S		5	1914	Saint-Léonard 1807–1811

== Bibliography ==
- Tordeur, Emile (1909). Le Machiniste des Chemins de Fer Belges (in French).
- Dambly, Phil (Apr 1967). "Septième période, 1898-1908. - Régime Mac Intosh". Le Rail (in French). No. 128.
- Vandenberghen, J. (1988). Periode Mac Intosh 1898-1904 (in French). Bruxelles: SNCB.
- Dagant, André (1974). "Cent vingt-cinq ans de construction de locomotives à vapeur en Belgique". Bulletin de l'Institut archéologique liégeois (in French). 86. Liège: Maison Curtius: 23–244.
