= Belgian State Railways Type 51 =

Class of 370 Belgian 0-6-0T locomotives

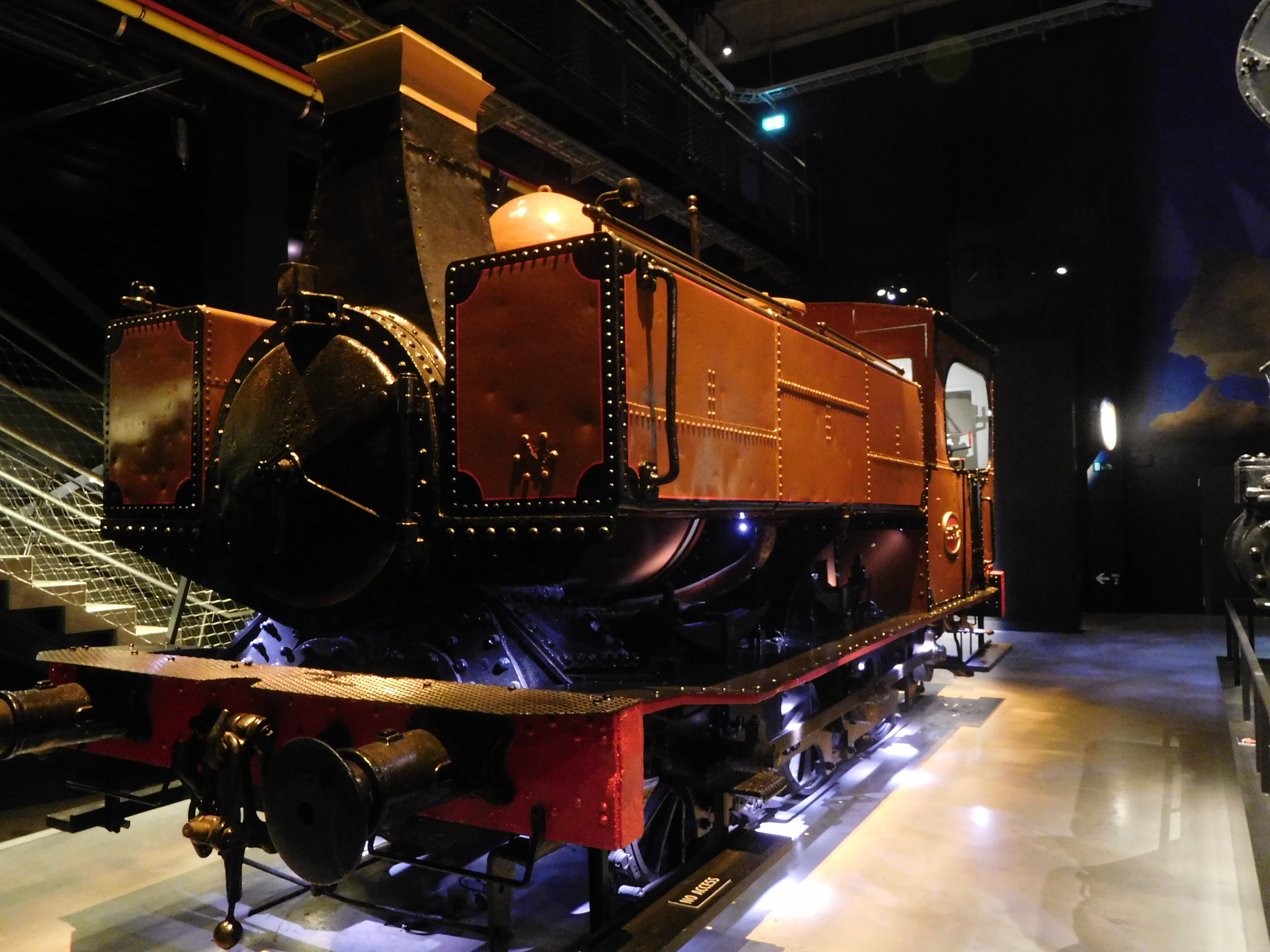
Type and origin
- Power type: Steam
- Build date: 1866–1905
- Total produced: 370
Specifications
- Configuration
  - Whyte: 0-6-0T
  - UIC: C n2t
- Gauge: 1,435 mm (4 ft 8 1/2 in)
- Driver dia.: 1,200 mm (3 ft 11 1/4 in)
- Wheelbase: 3.10 m (10 ft 2 in)
  - Axle spacing (Asymmetrical): 1.64 + 1.46 m (5 ft 4 1/2 in + 4 ft 9 1/2 in)
- Loco weight: 27.1–34.5 t (60,000–76,000 lb)
- Firebox
  - Type: Belpaire
- Cylinders: Two, inside
Career
- Operators: Belgian State Railways
- Class: Type 51

The Belgian State Railways Type 51 was a class of 0-6-0T steam locomotives for shunting and local train service, introduced in 1866.

== Construction history ==
The locomotives were built by various manufacturers from 1866 to 1905. The machines had an outside frame with the cylinders located inside the frame. During the extended period of time in which these machines were built they underwent various changes, e.g. in the design of the water tanks, shelter, boiler and overall length.

Known production quantities
Manufacturer	Quantity	Type / Years	Note
Cockerill	4		État Belge
Tubize	56	1879–1899	État Belge (54), Pehan (2)
Tubize	3	1905	exported to China
Saint-Léonard	155	1876–1905	État Belge
Saint-Léonard	3		exported to China
Couillet	52	1866–1895	État Belge
Couillet	4		Ouest de Mons, Mines de Crespin
Franco-Belge	22	1874	État Belge
Franco-Belge	2	1874	exported to China
Franco-Belge (La Croyère)	8	1906–1908	CF Pienlo (China)
Franco-Belge (Raismes)	6	1906–1908	Beijing–Hankou
Haine-Saint-Pierre	57	1875–1900	État Belge
La Meuse	13	1888–1898	État Belge
Carels Frères	11	1866	État Belge
Carels Frères	28		État Belge
Énergie (Marcinelle)	19		État Belge
Boussu	29	1902–1915	État Belge
Zimmermann-Hanrez	3	1885, 1895	État Belge
J.J. Gilain	3	1905	État Belge
Biesme	10		État Belge
Lambert (Marcinelle)	8	1889–1890	État Belge

Known production batches
Manufacturer	Series	Numbers	Quantity
Saint-Léonard	N O (1876)	458 – 460	3
Saint-Léonard	2 N O (1879)	492 – 495	4
Saint-Léonard	3 N O (1879)	501 – 505	5
Saint-Léonard	4 N O (1881)	528 – 534	7
Saint-Léonard	5 N O (1881)	567 – 572	6
Saint-Léonard	6 N O (1884)	669 – 677	9
Saint-Léonard	7 N O (1884)	685 – 689	5
Saint-Léonard	8 N O (1889)	813 – 817	5
Saint-Léonard	8 N O 2 (1889)	830 – 831	2
Saint-Léonard	9 N O (1895)	967 – 972	6
Saint-Léonard	9 N O 2 (1895)	984 – 985	2
Saint-Léonard	9 N O 3 (1897)	1073 – 1077	5
Saint-Léonard	9 N O 4 (1898)	1143 – 1146	4
Saint-Léonard	9 N O 5 (1898)	1154 – 1155	2
Saint-Léonard	9 N O 6 (1900)	1235 – 1239	5
Saint-Léonard	9 N O 7 (1900)	1245 – 1250	6
Saint-Léonard	9 N O 8 (1901)	1252 – 1261	10
