= Oviedo-Villapérez mining railway =

Railway line in Spain

Coordinates: 43.37757°N 5.86609°W

Oviedo-Villapérez
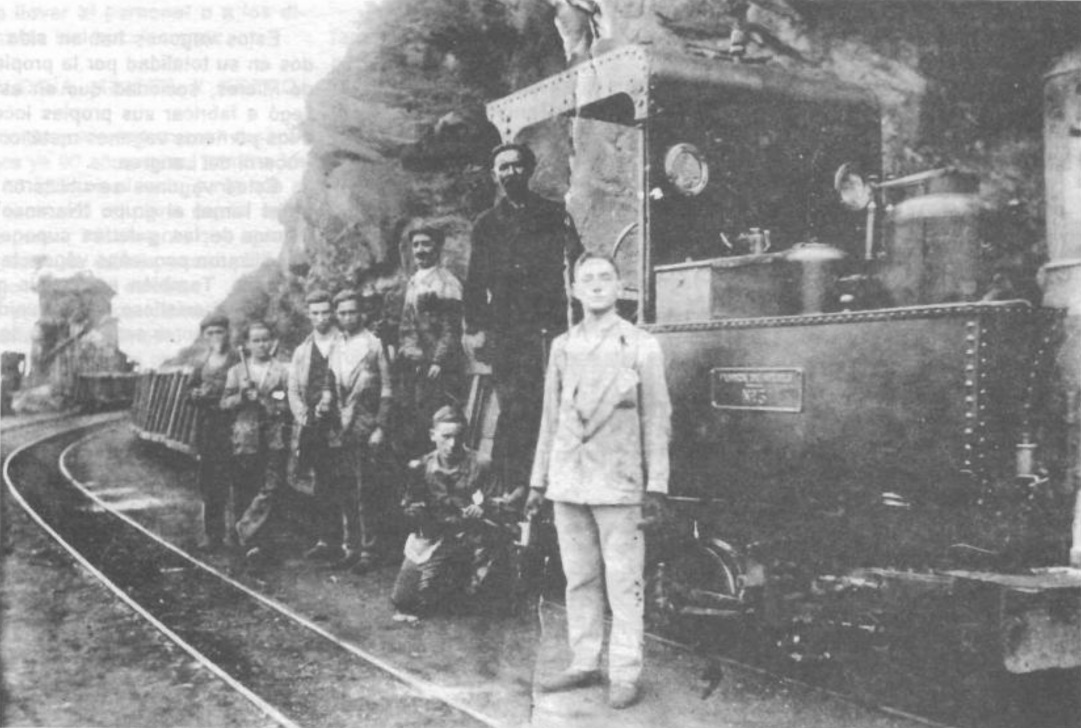
- Couillet locomotive N° 3 of the mining railway

Overview
- Native name: El Ferrocarril Minero de Oviedo a Villapérez

Technical
- Line length: 18 km (11 mi)
- Track gauge: 600 mm (1 ft 11 5/8 in)

The Oviedo-Villapérez mining railway was a narrow gauge railway with a track gauge of 600 mm (1 ft 11 5/8 in). It was just over 7 km (4 mi) long and ran from Oviedo to the iron ore mines in the Villapérez and Naranco areas of Asturias in northwest Spain, from 1880 to 1916.

== History ==
Industrialised underground mining of iron ore in Asturias began around 1879, although there is evidence of mining on Monte Naranco since at least the 17th century. The ore was mined in Villapérez and Lillo by the Sociedad Fábrica de Mieres, one of the mining and ironworks companies that initiated industrialisation in Asturias.

The construction of the mining railway began in 1879, to haul iron ore to the northern station in Oviedo, from where it could be transported to Mieres. On 23 March 1879, the Compañia Numa Gilhou changed its name to Sociedad Fábrica de Mieres. The iron ore is found on the Monte Naranco in two layers called Piquete and Naranco. These are respectively interbedded between ferruginous sandstones of the Devonian and rocky limestones that have been folded and uplifted as an anticline. The Piquete layer is 1 to 2 metres (3 ft 3 in to 6 ft 7 in) thick and has an iron content of 40 to 42%. The Naranco layer is only 1 to 1.5 metres (3 ft 3 in to 4 ft 11 in) thick and has an iron content of 38%.

Mining took place at different times in two different areas: The Villapérez area is located east of Monte Naranco near the Río Nora, and the Naranco area is near Oviedo. Exploitation in the Villapérez area began in 1879 with the opening of galleries in the Fuentenueva, Piquete and Gamoneda gorges, which divided the exploitation into four levels (pisos) or workshops (talleres) with a height of 30 metres (100 ft), the galleries being almost 400 metres (1,300 ft) long. The mines of this group were located between 280 and 312 metres (919 and 1,024 ft) above sea level. The mining system used was that of ascending pits followed by lining, a suitable system as the piquete layer here is almost vertical. From 1907 onwards, mining in this group ceased, as the output and grade of the Piquete layer, the only layer was exploited in this area, declined. Up to that time and since 1879, 400,000 tonnes of ore had been extracted from this area.

The Naranco area was located between 510 and 575 m (1,675 and 1,885 ft) above sea level closer to Oviedo and above the Villapérez area near the summit of Mount Naranco. Exploitation began in 1902, when production in the Villapérez area began to decline. Here there was only the Naranco layer, which had a lower iron content than the Piquete layer. Work began with the creation of a 200 metres (660 ft) long adit on the south side of the mountain, which followed the layer through two adits: one to the south, which came to the surface after 1,000 metres (3,300 ft) on the north slope of Mount Narenco in the Pevidal Gorge, and another to the north-west with a distance of 200 m (660 ft). These fields were divided into floors (pisos), with an average height of 30 metres (100 ft). In 1911, there were four workshops (talleres) in the Naranco area, with 36 pits and a total of 2,050 m (6,730 ft) of galleries. The Naranco stratum in this area lies either vertically, obliquely or horizontally, so that mining could partly take place without backfilling and without pillars. A total of 425,000 tonnes of iron ore were mined in this area between 1902 and 1915, indicating that mining was much more intensive than in the Villapérez area.

In 1915, the last year of mining, a total of 95 workers were employed in the mines and on the railway. In 1916 and 1917, only maintenance work was carried out in the mines. The Meres foundry was mainly supplied from other iron ore mines during First World War.

== Construction of the mining railway ==
In 1878, the Oviedo City Council received an application for permission to build the mining railway on Monte Naranco, which raised concerns as it was feared that the construction of the railway would affect the water supply of Fitoria, as it ran parallel to that of the future railway line.

On 1 February 1880, the original 7,101-metre (7,766 yd) long mining railway between the Villapérez area and the northern station of Oviedo operated by the Compañía de los Ferrocarriles de Asturias, Galicia y León was inaugurated with an original length of 7.1 km (4.4 mi). The total cost of building the railway was 129,906 pesetas, including 19,798 pesetas for expropriations.

== Route of the line ==
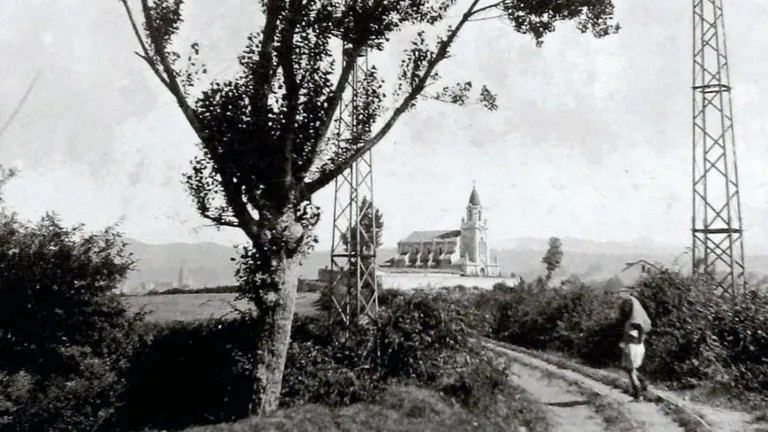
Mine railway above the northern station of Oviedo, located under the hill of San Pedro da Los Arcos, next to the church of the same name in the background

The mining railway started at Oviedo station at an elevation of 230 metres (750 ft). There was a track there on which a tipping device was installed to transfer the ore from the mine railway wagons to the Iberian gauge wagons. The wagons travelled on a double-track incline, which overcame a height difference of 31.5 m (103 ft) over a length of 128.89 m (422 ft 10 in). The carriages were each kept in balance by a 10 mm (25/64 in) diameter steel cable wound on a spool. The two cable drums were connected by a horizontal axle and both installed at the top of the inclined lift. There, on the hill of San Pedro de los Arcos, was the starting point of the Oviedo-Villaperez line, and at this location there were the tracks necessary for the manoeuvres, a locomotive depot, a turntable for turning and a water tank for filling the steam locomotives.

The track was 7,101 metres (7,766 yards) long, of which 4,015 metres (4,391 yards) were tangent and 3,086 metres (3,375 yards) chords. The entire line ran along the slope of Monte Naranco and was adapted to its relief to avoid major construction work, so that the curve radii were between 50 and 70 metres (160 and 230 ft), with only six being more than 100 metres (330 ft) long At the beginning of the alignment, however, there was a gradient of 16 mm/m (3/16 in/ft) over a length of 617.9 metres (2,027 ft) and a gradient of 19 mm/m (15/64 in/ft) over a length of 617.9 metres (2,027 ft 3 in). The trackbed was 3 metres (9 ft 10 in) wide, which, due to the fact that the alignment always runs halfway along the road, required complete earthmoving to be able to move the entire road. A total of 33,831 cubic metres (1,194,700 cu ft) of cut and fill had to be moved, i.e. 4.74 m^{3} (167 ft^{3}) for every metre of levelled area.

Metal sections manufactured in the Meres factory were used to build two bridges over small streams. The line first reached Guyences and finally Villapérez, the terminus of the line, where short stub tracks were used to serve the various adits of the Villapérez area. There was also a turntable and water tank here for the steam locomotives.

== Construction of the mining railway ==
In 1878, the Oviedo City Council received a planning application to build the mining railway on Monte Naranco, which raised concerns because it was feared that the construction of the railway would affect the water supply of Fitoria, as it ran parallel to that of the future railway line.

On 1 February 1880, the original 7.101-kilometre (4.412 mi) mining railway between the Villapérez area and the northern station of Oviedo operated by the Compañía de los Ferrocarriles de Asturias, Galicia y León was inaugurated with an original length of 7.1 km (4.4 mi). The total cost of building the railway in 1880 was approx 48,000 pesetas.

== Superstructure ==
The track material used for the permanent way of the mining railway was entirely manufactured by the Sociedad Fábrica de Mieres. The Vignol rails used had a weight of 8 kg/m (16 lbs/yd). The sleepers were made of oak wood with a length of 1 metre (3 ft 3 in), and a total of 16,083 pieces were used. The rails were connected to each other with connecting Bolted joints and to the sleepers with track nails. The total expenditure on the rail material in 1880 was about 48,000 pesetas.

== Branch line to the Naranco area ==
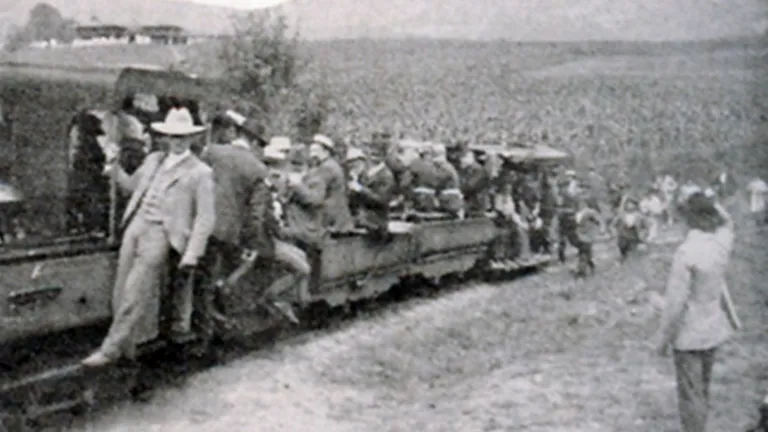
King Alfonso XIII on the mining railway

In 1902, when exploitation began in the Naranco area, a junction was created at line kilometre 2, where a 652-metre (2,139 ft) long inclined plane began, climbing a height of 510 metres (1,670 ft). From the summit of this plain, a 720-metre (790 yd) long branch line led westwards to the 'Narancti' group. The railway wagons used to travel up and down this inclined plane in pairs.

The upper part of the branch runs along a very steep slope. From 1902 to 1907, the railway line to the Villapérez area and its branch to the Naranco area were in operation simultaneously. After the closure of the mines in the Villapérez area in 1907, the more than 5-kilometre-long (3-mile) section from the junction to the Villaperez area was no longer used. In 1916, most of the mines in the Naranco area also ceased to operate, but in that year and the following year the railway probably continued to operate sporadically to serve the few remaining mines.

The railway was eventually dismantled and stored in a fenced area for several years.

== Rolling stock ==
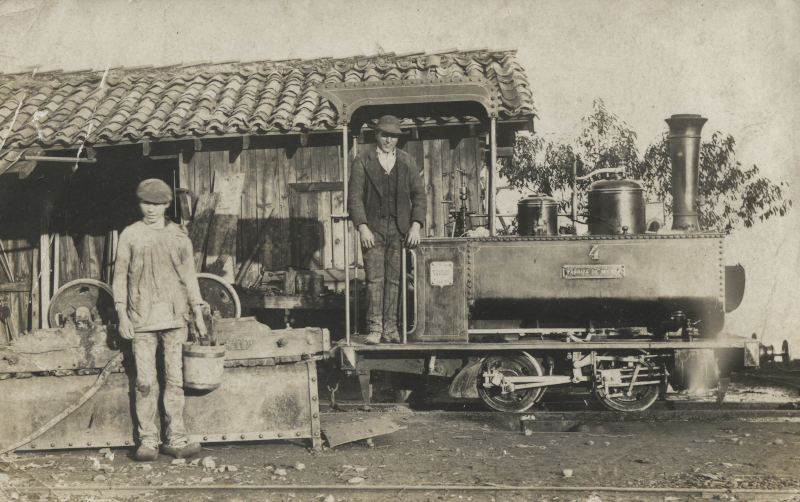
Couillet steam locomotive N° 4 of the Fábrica de Mieres in El Naranco, transporting iron ore from there to the northern railway station of Oviedo, ca. 1895

The railway was operated by Couillet steam locomotives, the first of which had been manufactured as early as 1877, shortly before Paul Decauville had demonstrated a similar Corpet-Louvet locomotive in 1878 at the Exposition Universelle in the Jardin d'Acclimatation:

No.	Factory No./Year of construction	Original use	Decommissioning
1	Couillet 382/1877	Ferrocarril Nicolasa a los Cribos (Ablana)	1949
2	Couillet 454/1879	Ferrocarril Oviedo a Villapérez	1952
3	Couillet 542/1881	Ferrocarril Nicolasa a los Cribos (Ablana)	1952-1955
4	Couillet		

The freight wagons used to transport ore had a wooden frame consisting of two longitudinal beams and two cross beams connected lengthwise by a draw bolt. On top of this frame was a 2.00 m (6 ft 7 in) long by 1.30 m (4 ft 3 in) wide by 40 cm (16 in) high box made of 3 mm (1/8 in) thick sheet steel, which had a capacity of more than 1 m^{3} (35 cu ft). This box had a fold-down side wall at one side. The wagons had cast-iron wheels with a diameter of 45 centimetres (18 in), which were attached to a movable axle. The wagons each had a brake that could be operated with a simple iron lever. The total empty weight of the wagon was 670 kilograms (1,480 lb) and the maximum load was 2,000 kilograms (4,400 lb) of iron ore.

These wagons were built entirely by the Fábrica de Mieres itself, a company that also manufactured the locomotives and the first metal wagons for the Ferrocarril de Langreo, among other things. These wagons were also used on the branch line to the Naranco area.

Before the opening of the railway, the Fábrica de Mieres imported two passenger carriages, each with eight seats, from abroad with the intention of using them to transport personnel from Oviedo to Villaperez, such as engineers, managers, etc. However, these wagons purchased by the railway company could not be used for the transport of personnel from Oviedo to Villaperez. However, the wagons, which had been purchased at a price of 852.15 pesetas each, were held up by customs at the beginning of 1880 because customs demanded the payment of import duties in accordance with the tariffs for railway wagons. These amounted to an amount much higher than the price of the wagons themselves, as the only existing tariff for railway wagons applied to them was the one prescribed for broad-gauge wagons used on the general railways. The Fábrica de Mieres refused to pay a higher tariff than the goods themselves, so the wagons were stored at customs while the tariff reduction was negotiated. It is not known if they ever arrived on the railway line from Oviedo to Villaperez or in Mieres, or if they were abandoned.

== Remains ==
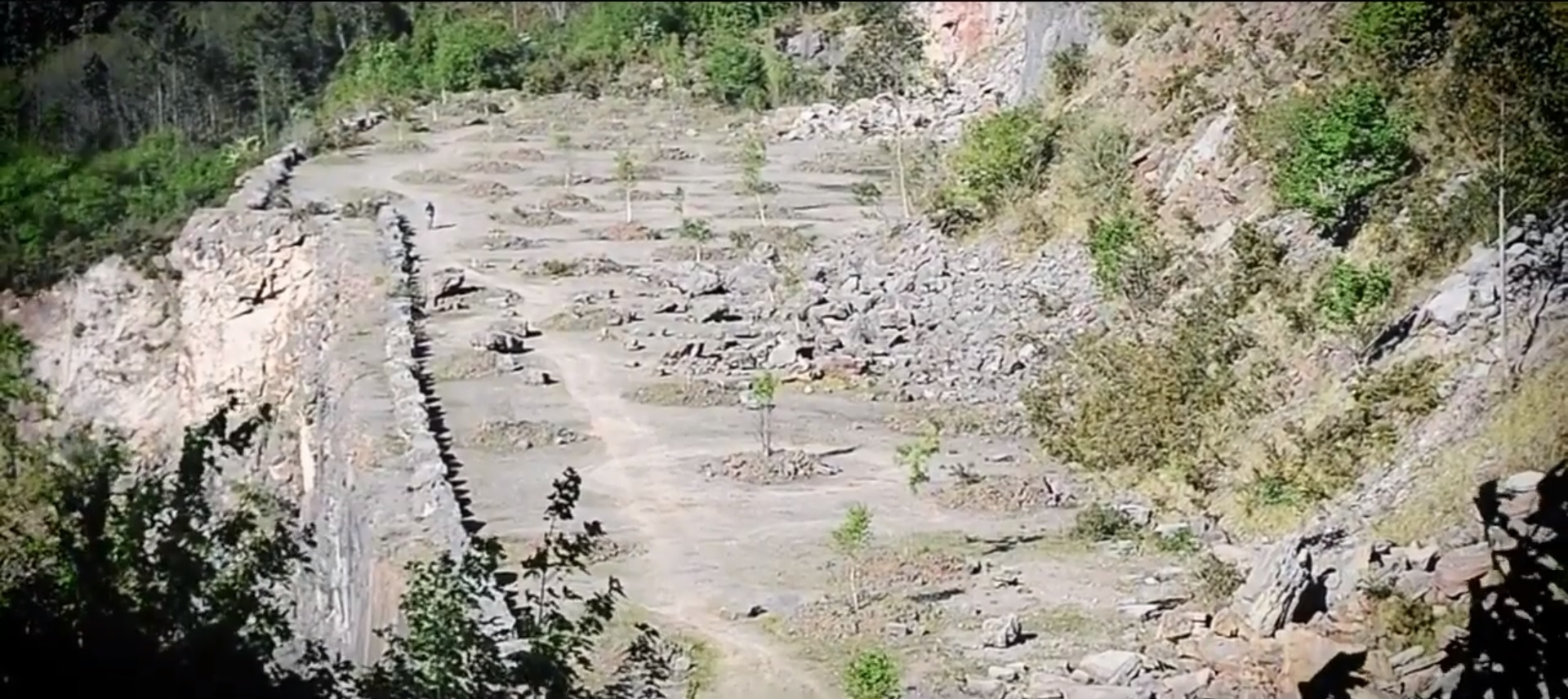
Reforestation in the Villapérez area

There are no remains of the railway for the first two kilometres (1.2 miles) from Oviedo railway station, which is now in the middle of the city. The inclined plane and the route of the branch line to the Naranco area, however, are still recognisable. Part of the route is now used as a trim trail and hiking trail under the name Pista Finlandesa. A mountain bike-trail created in 2020 leads to the Naranco area.
