= Chemin de fer à vapeur des Trois Vallées =

Heritage railway line in Wallonia, Belgium

CFV3V
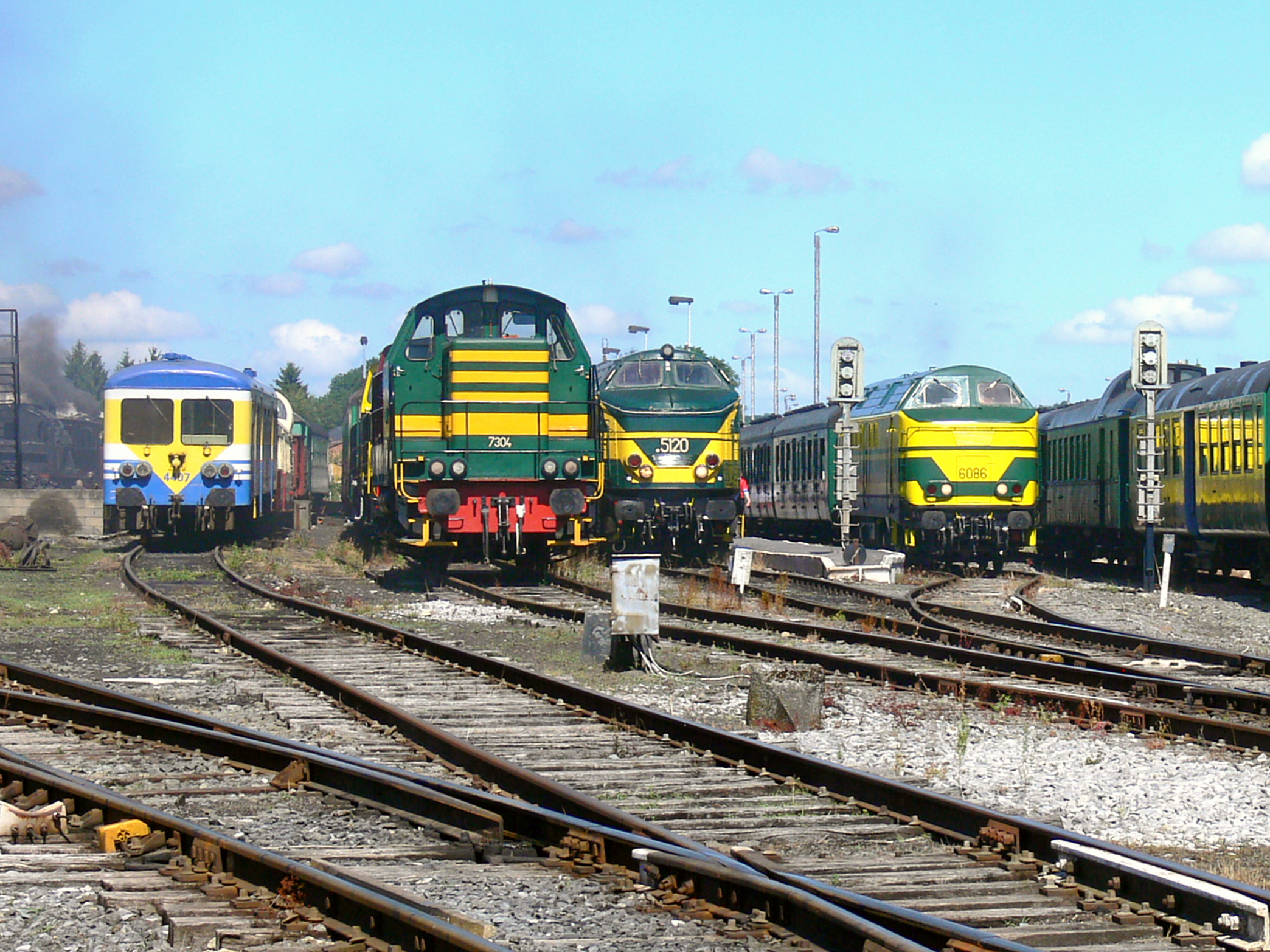
- Locale: Province of Namur
- Terminus: Treignes
- Coordinates: 50.0926325°N 4.5305752°E

Commercial operations
- Name: Line 132 (Mariembourg - Treignes)
- Original gauge: 4 ft 8 1/2 in (1,435 mm)

Preserved operations
- Length: 14 km (8.7 mi)

Website
- https://cfv3v.eu/

The Chemin de fer à vapeur des Trois Vallées (English: Three Valleys Steam Railway) is a heritage railway in southern Belgium, created in 1973.

It is a non-profit society that operates a railway from the town of Mariembourg, near Couvin to Treignes, near Viroinval. The length of the railway runs about 14 km (8.7 mi) over standard gauge track. The society's name comes from the three rivers followed by the line; River Eau Blanche, River Eau Noire, and River Viroin. The heritage railway connects with the greater Belgian rail network in Mariembourg.

The society runs two main facilities. The society has constructed its own platforms near the old locomotive roundhouse and water tower in Mariembourg, and in Treignes, a former border station, a museum with a large workshop has been built. The last 3 kilometres (1.9 mi) from the line (partially established in France) are no longer usable, as its tunnel has been sold and turned in a mushroom growing plant.

Founded by former rail employees, the society purchased many steam engines from the largely nascent coal industry in its early years. Since then, it has also acquired representative rolling stocks from Belgium and neighbouring countries, France and Luxembourg, and from countries where steam locomotives were still in use, such as Poland and East Germany.

== Rolling stock ==
=== Steam locomotives ===
==== Operational ====
Original Railway	Number and name	Type or Class	Builder	Works Number	Built	Wheels	Notes	Image
Teutoburger Wald-Eisenbahn	158 ELNA		Henschel & Son	24917	1940	2-6-0T	Purchased from Stoomtrein Goes - Borsele.	
Deutsche Reichsbahn	64 250	DRG Class 64	Henschel & Son	22178	1933	2-6-2T		
André Dumont (Waterschei) (coal mine)	AD05		Ateliers métallurgiques, Tubize	2007	1926	0-6-0T	Restored in 2009.	
André Dumont (Waterschei) (coal mine)	AD09		Ateliers de construction de La Meuse	4672	1951	0-8-0T		
Neuenkirche Hütte	NE61; André CHAPELON		SACM, Graffenstaden	8099	1952	0-8-0T		
	SA01		Anglo-Franco-Belge	2596	1945	0-6-0T	Acquired operational in 1978. Firebox replaced in 2008–2010.	

==== Under reconstruction ====
Original Railway	Number and name	Type or Class	Builder	Works Number	Built	Wheels	Notes	Image
Deutsche Reichsbahn	DR 50 3696-7	DRB Class 50	Krupp	2059	1939	2-10-0		
PKP	TKt48-87	TKt 48	Cegielski	1848	1952	2-8-2T	Restored in 2005 in fantasy blue livery.	
SA	SA03		Ateliers métallurgiques, Tubize	2002	1929	0-6-0T	Restored in 2014	
SNCV	808		Société Saint Léonard, Liège	941	1894	0-6-0T	Restored in 2007	
Heuze – Malevez – Simon, Auvelais	DG22	Type III	Cockerill	2851	1913	0-4-0T	Small shunter with vertical boiler. Acquired operational in 1980.	
Monceau-Fontaine coal mine	MF32		Haine Saint Pierre	792	1904	0-4-0T	Acquired in 1976. Under reconstruction.	

==== Stored, cosmetic condition ====
Original Railway	Number and name	Type or Class	Builder	Works Number	Built	Wheels	Notes	Image
Deutsche Reichsbahn	DR 52-467; 52 8200-9	DRB Class 52 (ex DR Class 52.80)	Borsig	15564	1942	2-10-0	Reko-lok retrofitted to its original type in 2004.	
Monceau-Fontaine coal mine	MF73		Usines Metallurgiques du Hainaut, Couillet	1756	1922	0-6-0T	Acquired operational in 1975.	
Monceau-Fontaine coal mine	MF91		Usines Metallurgiques du Hainaut, Couillet	1834	1930	0-8-0T	Acquired operational in 1975. This engine has hauled the first train of the CFV3V.	
Pieux Franki, Liège	PF84		La Meuse	3398	1932	0-4-0T	Displayed as monument in Mariembourg.	
Monceau-Fontaine coal mine	MF33		Haine Saint Pierre	1204	1911	0-4-0T	Acquired operational in 1976. Sold in 2013 to National Railway Company of Belgium for Train World.	

==== In storage, needing restoration ====
- ÖBB 52-3314 (oOOOOO): built by Jung in 1944.
- SA02 (0-6-0T): built by Anglo-Franco-Belge. Rusted and in bad technical condition. may be used for didactical purpose.
- MF62 (0-4-0T): built by Baldwin, Philadelphia in 1916 for the US Transportation Corp. Former SNCB type 50.
- n° 1 (0-4-0T) Clabecq. Rusted. Acquired in 2003.

A few other locomotives from the National Railway Company of Belgium are display at Treignes Museum.

=== Diesel locomotive ===
==== Operational ====
- SNCB 5120 (Co'Co'), built by Cockerill (Liège) in 1961. Green painting scheme.
- SNCB 6086 (Bo'Bo'), built by Cockerill (Liège) in 1964. Yellow painting scheme.
- SNCB 7304 (C), built by BN in 1965.
- SNCB 9008 (B), built by Cockerill (Liège) in 1964.
- Fina 1 (B), built by Hunslet, Leeds in 1983. used to be operated at FINA's oil refinery, Antwerp.
- Fina 2 (B), built by Cockerill (Liège) in 1963.
- VL02-1 and VL02-2 B, built by Cockerill (Liège) for Dolomies de Marche les Dames. Repainted in the Class 77 painting scheme (as the two similar units from SNCB's Ostend depot)
- SNCF 63123 (Bo'Bo'), built by Brissonneau et Lotz in 1956. Repainted as CFL BB 914 (previously in Swiss' CFF Em 4/41123)
- SNCF 63149 (Bo'Bo'), built by Brissonneau et Lotz in 1956. In SNCF's original green painting scheme.
- SNCF Y 5130 (B), built by De Dietrich, Reichshoffen in 1964.
- SNCF Y 6502 (B), 1957.

==== In storage, needing restoration ====
- GV69 (B), built by ABR (Ateliers Belges Réunis), Familleureux in 1964
- FDP1 (B), built by Klöckner Humboldt Deutz, Köln in 1956 for Frateur - De Pourcq, railway infrastructure company in Boom (Belgium).

=== Diesel railcar ===
- SNCB 4407 built by Ateliers Germain, Monceau-sur-Sambre in 1954,
- SNCB 4510
- SNCB 4608, 4610, 4611 et 4616 built by the Ragheno works in Mechelen in 1952,
- SNCF X3998 "Picasso",
- CFL 211 built by Westwaggon (Köln-Deutz), 1956.
- Mindener Kreisbahnen VT3, built by Talbot Aachen Waggonfabrik in 1953 for Mindener Kreisbahn (local railways of Minden, Germany). Numbered 550.09.
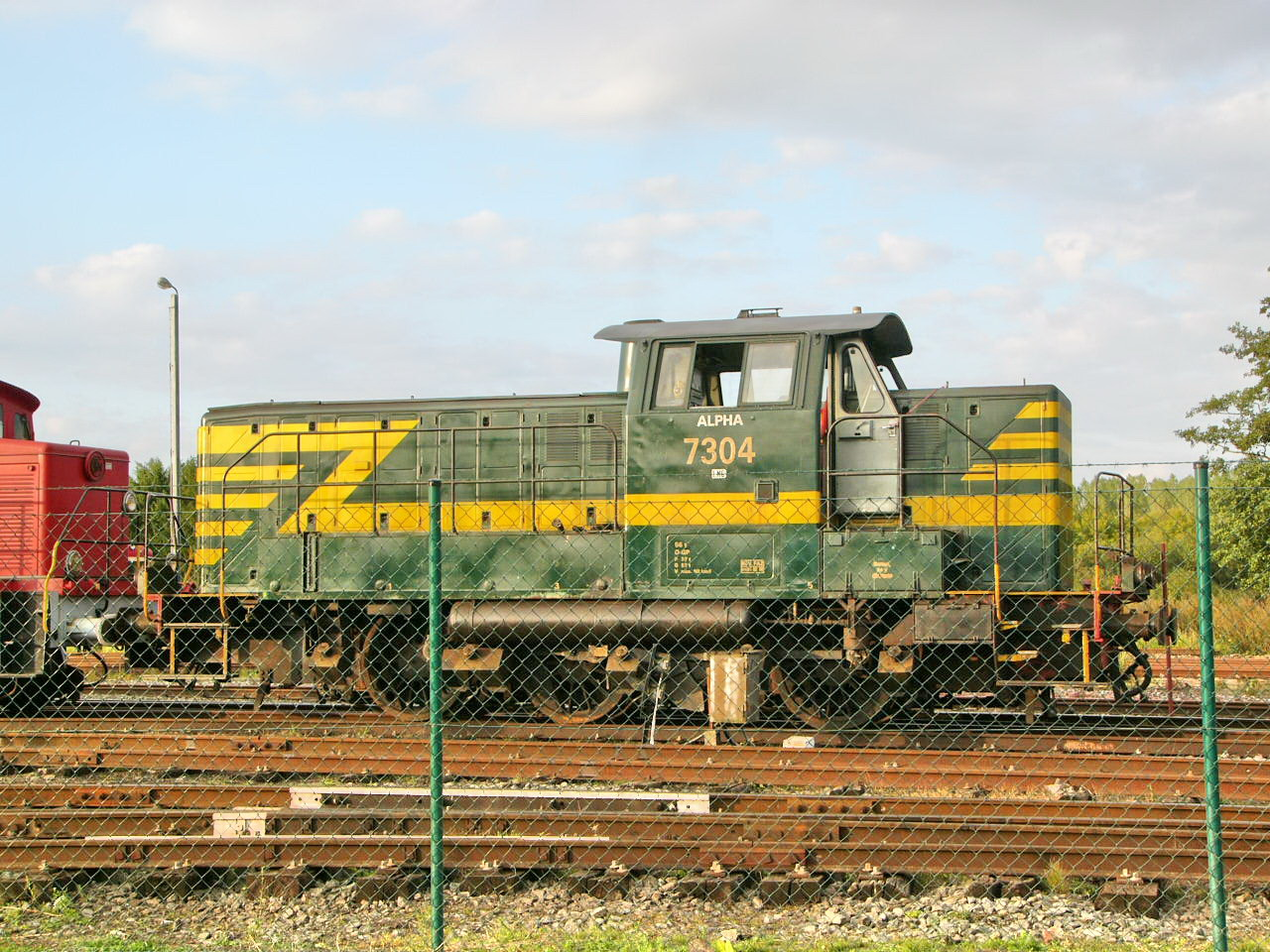
SNCB 7304

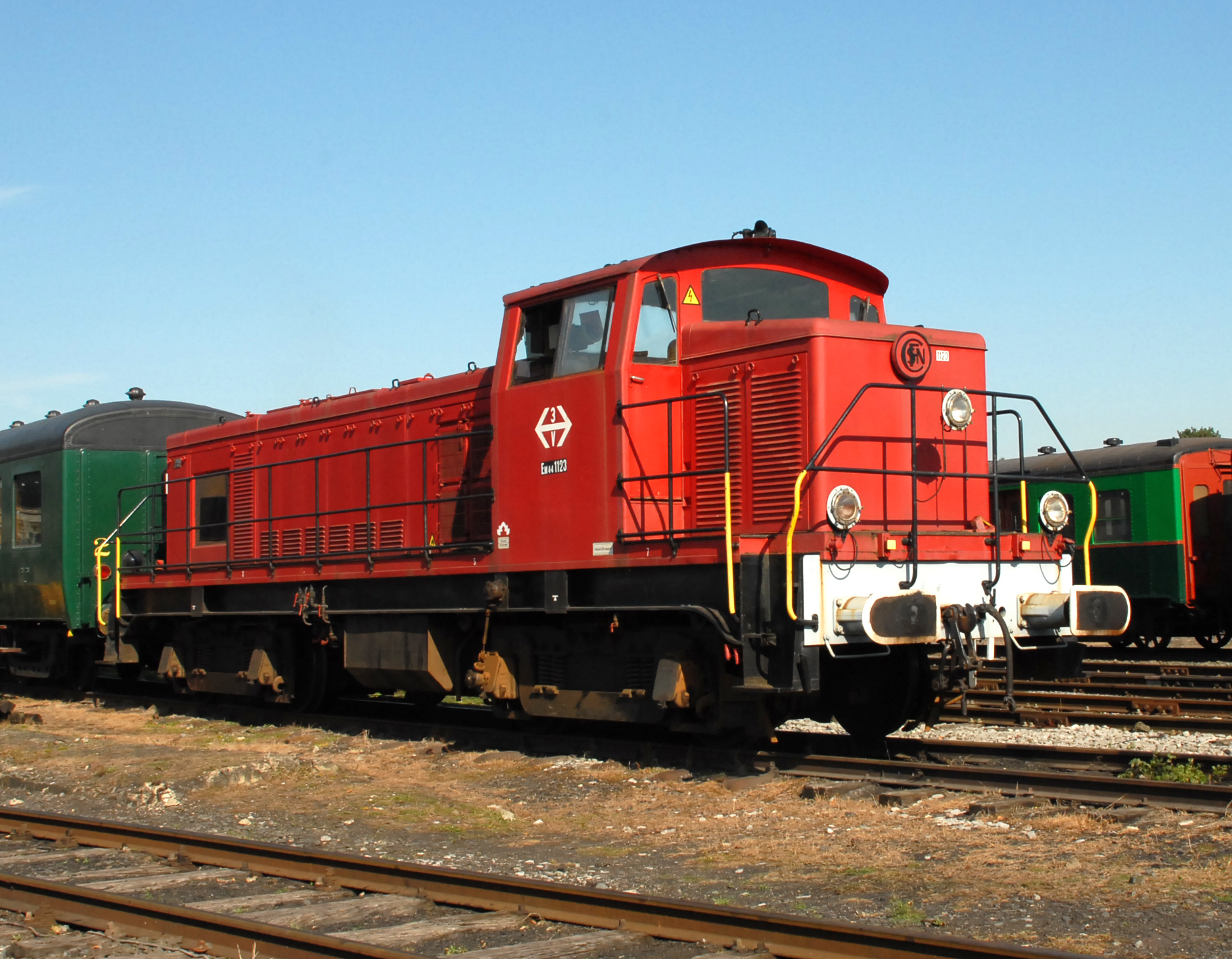
SNCF 63123 painted as CFF Em 4/4

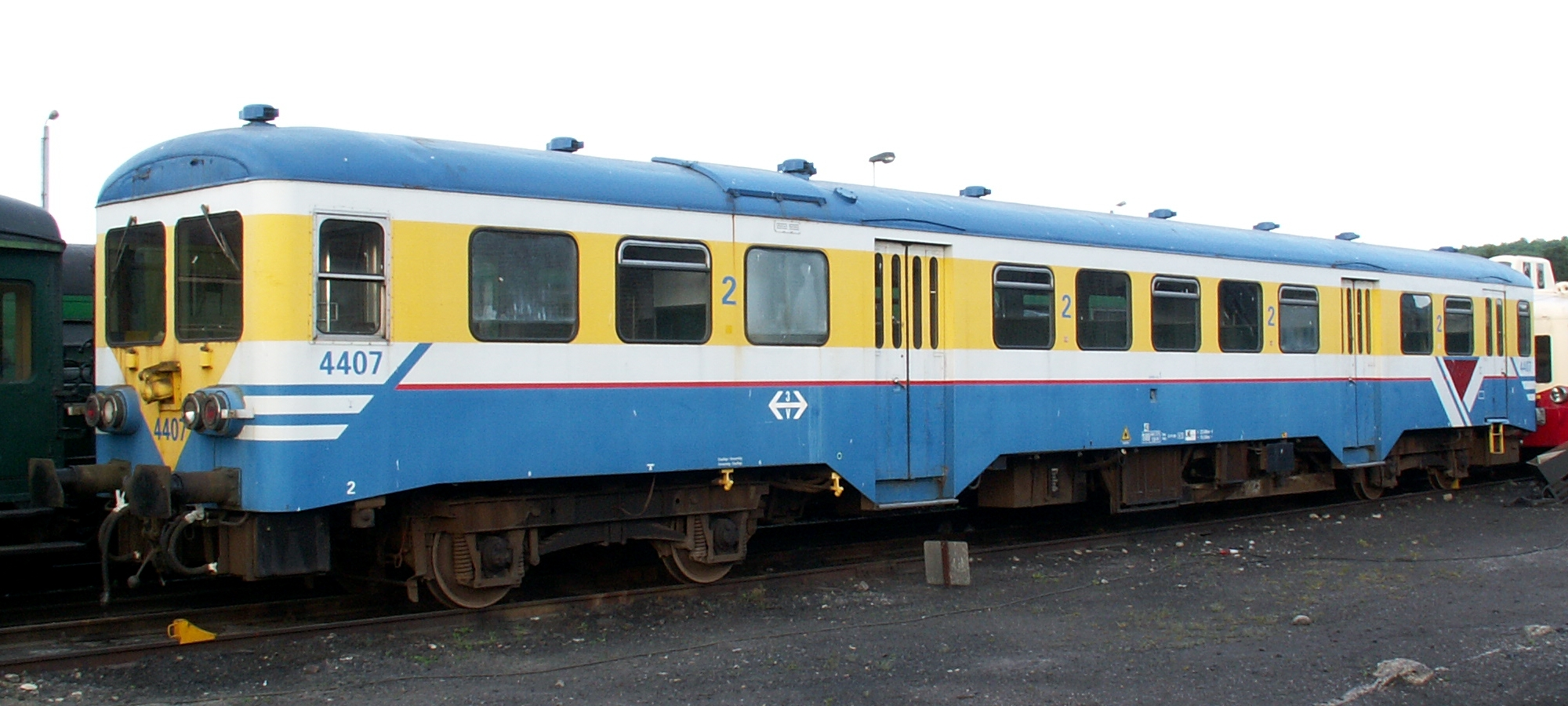
4407 railcar

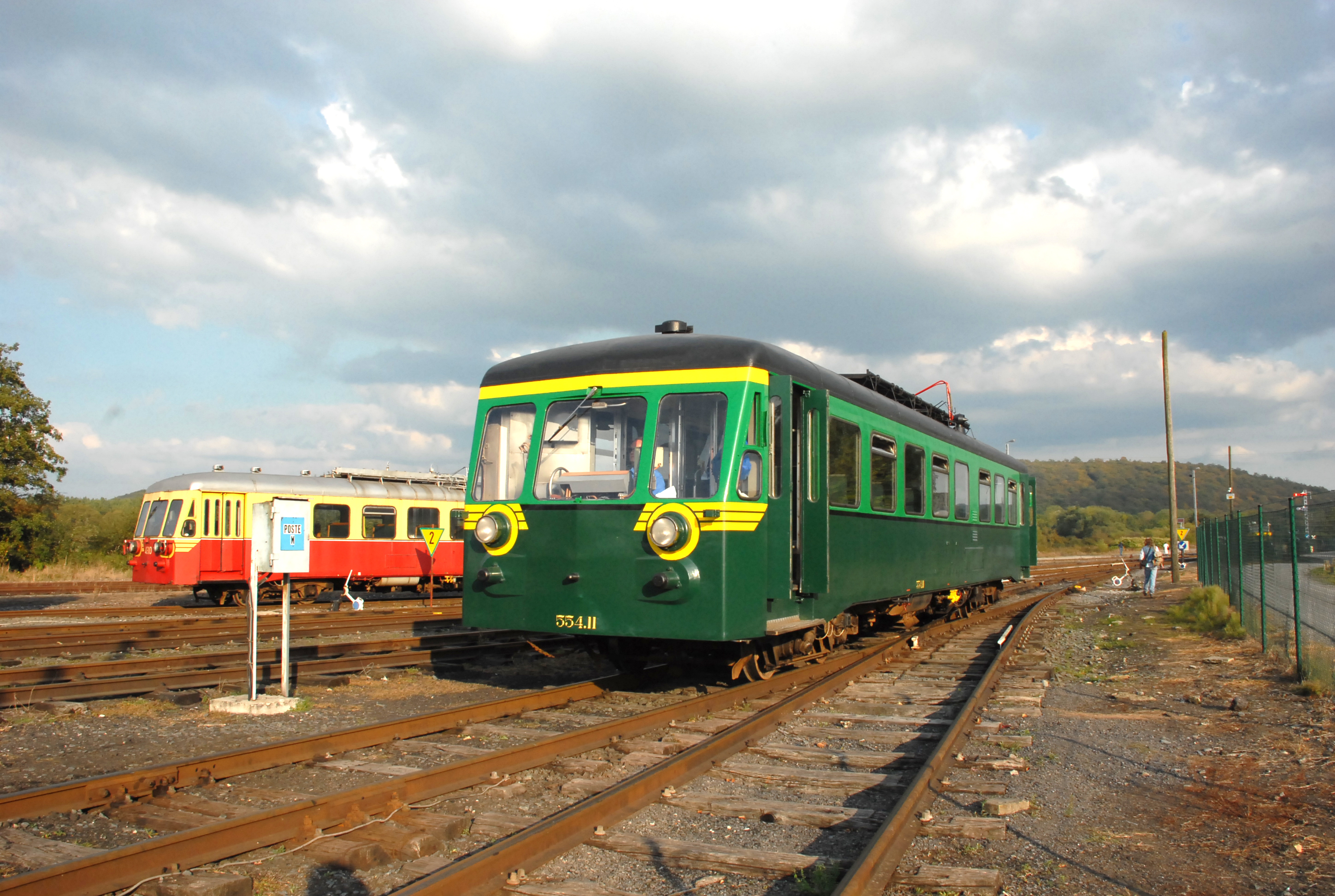
554.11 and 4610

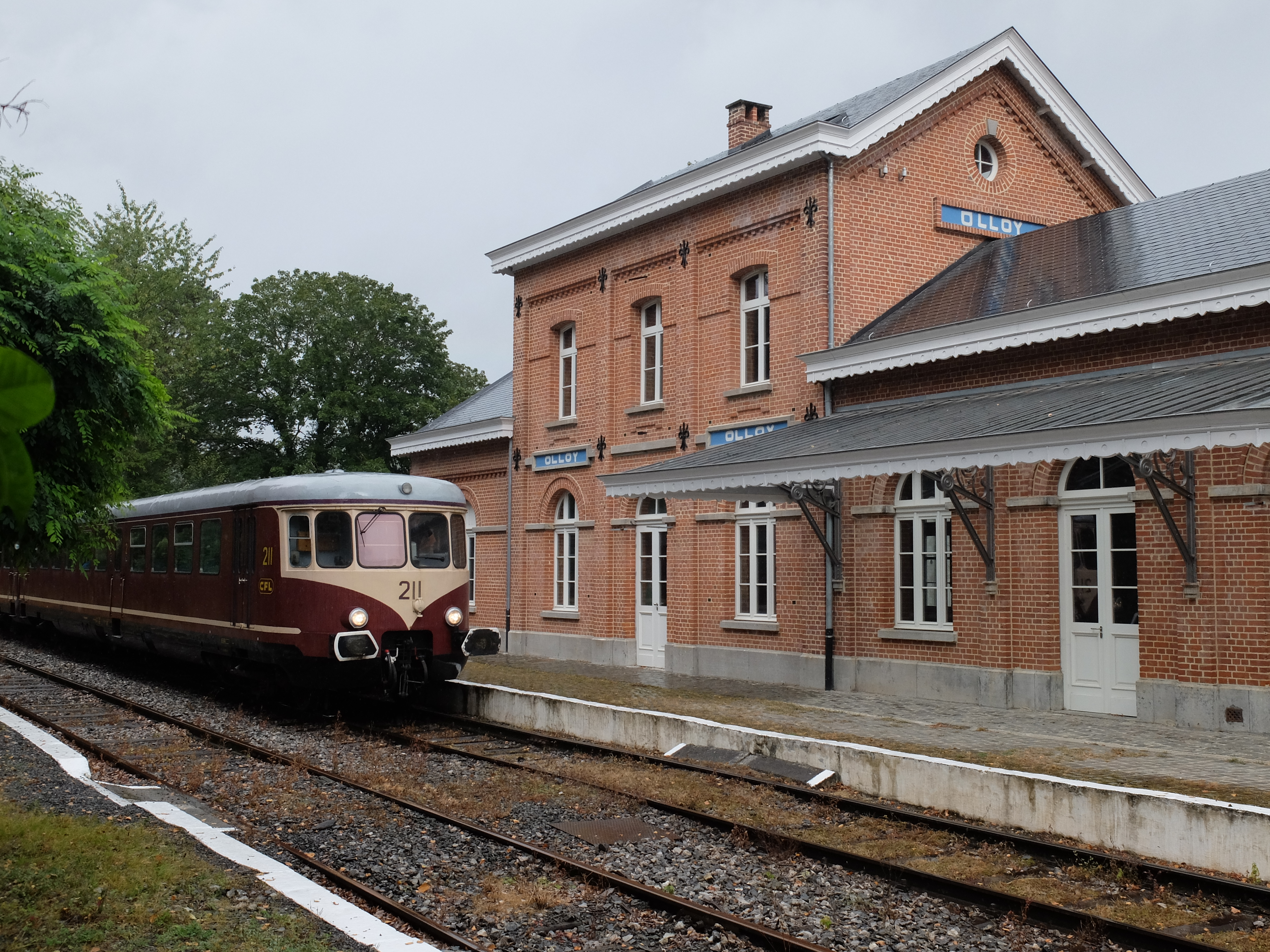
CFL 211
Olloy-sur-Viroin
