= Ateliers de construction de La Meuse =

Belgian manufacturing and engineering company

Ateliers de la Meuse
- Type: Public
- Founded: 1850; 176 years ago in Liège, Belgium
- Net income: €10M (2017)
- Website: www.alm.be

Ateliers de construction de La Meuse (French pronunciation: [atəlje də kɔ̃stʁyksjɔ̃ də la møz]) are a manufacturing and engineering company based in Liège in Belgium. During the period from 1888 to 1958, La Meuse built 1350 steam locomotives some for Belgian State Railways (later NMBS/SNCB), and many more for industrial networks. Of these a substantial number survive worldwide.

The company still exists today, focusing on boilermaking, mechanics and the assembly of large-scale machinery. They have facilities in Sclessin and Seraing.

== History ==
The origins of the business date back to the 16th century. During 1835 Charles Marcellis, forge master, moved his business to La Boverie, Liège. The company was set up as Société Anonyme des Ateliers de la Meuse. In 1872, the name was changed to Société Anonyme des Ateliers de construction de La Meuse. These new workshops were erected on the site they currently occupy between the Meuse river and the Paris-Namur-Liége-Cologne rail line. Expansion followed so that they occupied an area of about ten hectares. The company produced heavy industrial equipment for mining and metallurgy. The first locomotives were built in 1887 for the SNCV, and La Meuse would be the last company to deliver a steam locomotive to NMBS/SNCB.

In 1889, there was produced a narrow gauge locomotive for an industrial user. They went on to eventually build over 800 locomotives for industrial users. Their customers were mostly Belgium, but also Italy, Yugoslavia, Morocco, Congo, Romania, Turkey, Spain, Latin America and the Netherlands.

== Locomotives ==
=== Belgian State Railways ===
- Type 8
- Type 9
- Type 10
- Type 11
- Type 12
- Type 23
- Type 25
- Type 29
- Type 32/32S
- Type 36
- Type 51

=== Deutsche Reichsbahn ===
- DRB Class 50

=== Hellenic State Railways ===
- SEK class Κγ

== Surviving Steam Locomotives ==
Works No.	Plated Year	Number/ name	Wheel arrangement	Gauge	Class	To	Notes
1631	1900	11	B n2t	600 mm		Estrada de Ferro Central do Brasil	Preserved at Museu do Trem do Engenho de Dentro in Rio de Janeiro, Brazil.
1760	1902		B	770 mm			
1812	1908	5	B n2t	1000 mm		Built for Société de Construction du Port de Bahia S.A., later used by Companhia Paraíba de Cimento Portland.	Preserved at LP Assessoria Industrial in Votorantim, Brazil.
1828	1903	13	C n2t	1435 mm		Between 1903 and 1957 Mines d'Auchel (Département Pas-de-Calais), later CENPA (in Bègles).	Preserved at Ecomusée de la Grande Lande in Marquèze.
1971	1905	101	C n2t	1000 mm		Estrada de Ferro do Paraná, later at Estrada de Ferro São Paulo - Rio Grande. In 1935 was numbered 101 for Rede de Viação Paraná - Santa Catarina.	On display minus tender Praça Tomi Nakagawa in Londrina, Paraná, Brazil
1972	1905	102	C n2t	1000 mm		Estrada de Ferro do Paraná, later at Estrada de Ferro São Paulo - Rio Grande. In 1935 was numbered 102 for Rede de Viação Paraná - Santa Catarina.	One of the few steam locomotives that survived when Rede Ferroviária Federal (RFFSA) ended steam operations in Brazil in 1958. Preserved by Associação Brasileira de Preservação Ferroviária (ABPF) in Piratuba, Brazil.
2085	1929	877	E	1435 mm			
2161	1908	240.05	D	1435 mm	240		
2215	1909	21?	C n2t	1000 mm		Probably until 1912 as No. 21 of the Port Authority of Rio Grande, Brazil.	Today in the harbour museum.
2216	1909	21	C n2t	1000 mm		As No. 21 by the Port Authority of Rio Grande, Brazil.	Later Estrada de Ferro Carlos Barbosa - Alfredo Chaves, then as No. 6 at the Viação Férrea do Rio Grande do Sul. Exhibited today at the Largo Evandro Behr in Santa Maria, Brazil.
2216	1909	22?	C n2t	1000 mm		May be No. 22 at the Port Authority of Rio Grande, Brazil.	
2217	1909	23?	C n2t	1000 mm		Thought to be No. 23 at the Port Authority of Rio Grande, Brazil.	Later at the Estrada de Ferro Carlos Barbosa - Alfredo Chaves, and as No. 32 at the Viação Férrea do Rio Grande do Sul. Preserved at the railway station in Canela in Rio Grande do Sul, Brazil.
2218	1909	24?	C n2t	1000 mm		Thought to be No. 24 of the Port Authority in Rio Grande, Brazil	Later at Estrada de Ferro Carlos Barbosa - Alfredo Chaves, and No. 8 of Viação Férrea do Rio Grande do Sul. Stored at the railway works Rio Grande, Rio Grande do Sul, Brazil.
2224	1911	14	C n2t	950 mm			FCE 14 of Ferrovia Circumetnea in Catania, Italy.
2330	1911	15	C n2t	1000 mm		Delivered as No. 15 to the Port Authority of Rio Grande, Brazil.	Preserved at the railway works of Rio Grande, Rio Grande do Sul, Brazil.
2395	1911		C n2t	1000 mm		Delivered to the Port Authority of Rio Grande, Brazil.	Exhibited in the Centro Administrativo Leopoldo Petry in Novo Hamburgo, Rio Grande do Sul, Brazil.
2402	1912	19	C n2t	1000 mm		Delivered as No. 19 to the Port Authority of Rio Grande, Brazil.	Preserved at the railway works in Rio Grande, Rio Grande do Sul, Brazil.
2403	1912	21	C n2t	1000 mm		Delivered as No. 21 to the Port Authority of Rio Grande, Brazil.	Preserved in Capão do Leão, Rio Grande do Sul, Brazil.
2658	1912		C n2t	1435 mm		Built for Compagnie des chemins de fer secondaires du Nord-Est	Now at Train Thur Doller Alsace.
2741	1914	38	B	1000 mm			
2804	1916	MF 83	C n2t	1435 mm			Now MF 83 at Chemin de fer à vapeur des Trois Vallées.
2828	1922		B n2t	600 mm		To a factory in São José dos Pinhais, Paraná, Brazil.	From it was moved to the Riesemberg family farm in União da Vitória, Paraná, Brazil.
2864	1915		B	600 mm			
3052	1924	ON-14	C n2t	1435 mm		Oranje Nasau mine in Heerlen as ON-14.	Now at Nederlands Mijnmuseum in Heerlen.
3107	1924		C n2t	1435 mm		Delivered to a factory in Bouchain, France.	Train touristique de Guîtres à Marcenais.
3176			C n2t	1000/1435 mm		Delivered as meter gauge locomotive on the Chemin de Fer d'Artois.	1932 converted to standard gauge. 1944 used by the United States Army Transportation Corps (USATC) as a standard gauge shunter in operation in the port of Antwerp. Later at the Sas van Gent sugar factory. Initially preserved 1971–1977 on the Museumstoomtram Hoorn–Medemblik. Since then in the Museum Buurtspoorweg.
3223	1926	Bebert	C n2t	1435 mm		Belgian coal mine Charbonnages de Werister.	Stoomcentrum Maldegem.
3235	1928	55.011	B n2t	1435 mm			
3243	1929	6	B n2t	762 mm		SA Hoboken in Antwerpen, Belgium.	Rebuilt using parts from 3355 of 1929 - carries 3355's worksplate. Initially preserved as 6 Winston at Statfold Barn Railway. Since 2020 operating at St. Nicholas Abbey Heritage Railway in Barbados.
3252	1929	5 Enkhuizen	C n2t	1435 mm		Feritlizer manufacturers Dutch Nitrogen in Sluiskil (Netherlands).	1972 preserved as SHM 5 Enkhuizen at Museum Buurtspoorweg.
3292	1928	3 Bison	C n2t	1435 mm		Delivered as number 16 for Oranje Nassaumijnen in Heerlen, Netherlands.	Preserved as 3 Bison at Stoomtrein Goes - Borsele.
3314	1928	122	B fl	1435 mm			
3332	1928	704	B fl	1435 mm			ARBED 704, Association des Musee et tourisme.
3340	1929		1D	600 mm			
3362	1929		B n2t	1000 mm		ARBED-Steelworks Esch-sur-Alzette.	Preserved at Niederpallen station of the Schmalspurbahn Nördingen–Martelingen
3442	1933	LA MEUSE	C n2t	1435 mm			At Pallot Heritage Steam Museum, Jersey.
3907	1924		B n2t	1435 mm			Train touristique de Guîtres à Marcenais.
3931	1938	9 Les Fontenelles	1'C n2t	600 mm		Sucrerie de Maizy (Aisne).	Now at Musée des transports de Pithiviers.
3932	1938		1'C n2t	600 mm		Sucrerie de Maizy (Aisne).	Now at Chemin de fer de la vallée de l’Ouche.
4057	1953	AD 08	D n2t	1435 mm		André-Dumont coal mine in Waterschei.	Preserved as AD 08 by Chemin de fer à vapeur des Trois Vallées
4123	1942	AD 07	D n2t	1435 mm		Andre Dumont coal mine, Genk,	Now AD 07 at Association des Musee et tourisme
4147	1942		C n2t	1100 mm		Bobrek coal mine Bytom.	Now at Warsaw Railway Museum.
4360	1947	706	2C1				
4480	1951	AD 09	D n2t	1435 mm		André-Dumont coal mine in Waterschei.	Preserved at Chemin de fer à vapeur des Trois Vallées
4672	1951		D	1435 mm			
5346	1956		C fl				
5347	1956		C fl				
