= Belgian State Railways Type 5 =

Class of 35 Belgian 2-4-0T locomotives

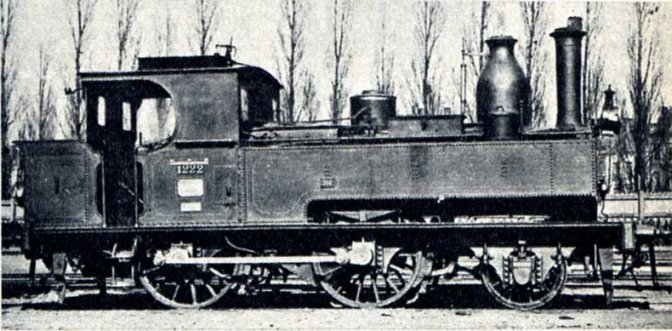
Type and origin
- Power type: Steam
- Build date: 1880–1881
- Total produced: 35
Specifications
- Configuration
  - Whyte: 2-4-0T
  - UIC: 1B n2t
- Gauge: 1,435 mm (4 ft 8 1/2 in) standard gauge
- Driver dia.: 1,450 mm (57.09 in)
- Wheelbase: 4.27 m (14 ft 0 in)
- Loco weight: 31.66 t (31.16 long tons; 34.90 short tons)
- Firebox
  - Type: Belpaire
  - Grate area: 1.4498 m^{2} (15.606 sq ft)
- Heating surface: 55.1988 m^{2} (594.155 sq ft)
- Cylinders: Two, inside
- Cylinder size: 350 mm × 460 mm (13.78 in × 18.11 in)
- Valve gear: Walschaert
Career
- Operators: Belgian State Railways
- Class: Type 5

The Belgian State Railways Type 5 was a class of 2-4-0T steam locomotives for local passenger service, introduced in 1880.

== Construction history ==
The locomotives were built by various manufacturers from 1880 to 1881. The machines had an outside frame with the cylinders and the Walschaert located inside the frame. Starting with 1900 the machines received new boilers, with overall weight increasing to 32 t (31.49 long tons; 35.27 short tons).

Production quantities
| Manufacturer | Serial numbers | Quantity | Date in service | État Belge Numbers |
|---|---|---|---|---|
| Franco-Belge | 326–335 | 10 | 1881 | EB 1220–1224, 1278–1282 |
| Franco-Belge | 340–341, 343, 342, 339, 344–345, 349–350, 355, 351 | 11 | 1881 | EB 1357–1367 |
| Saint-Léonard | 552–558 | 7 | 1881 | EB 227, 229, 536, 564, 862, 971, 1425 |
| Franco-Belge | 354, 353, 356, 358, 357, 360, 359, 361 | 8 | 1881 | EB 1426–1433 |
| Zimmermann-Hanrez | 76 | 1 | 1900 | EB 1218 (Type 5^{bis}, possibly a rebuild) |
