= Belgian Railways Class 73 =

Class 73
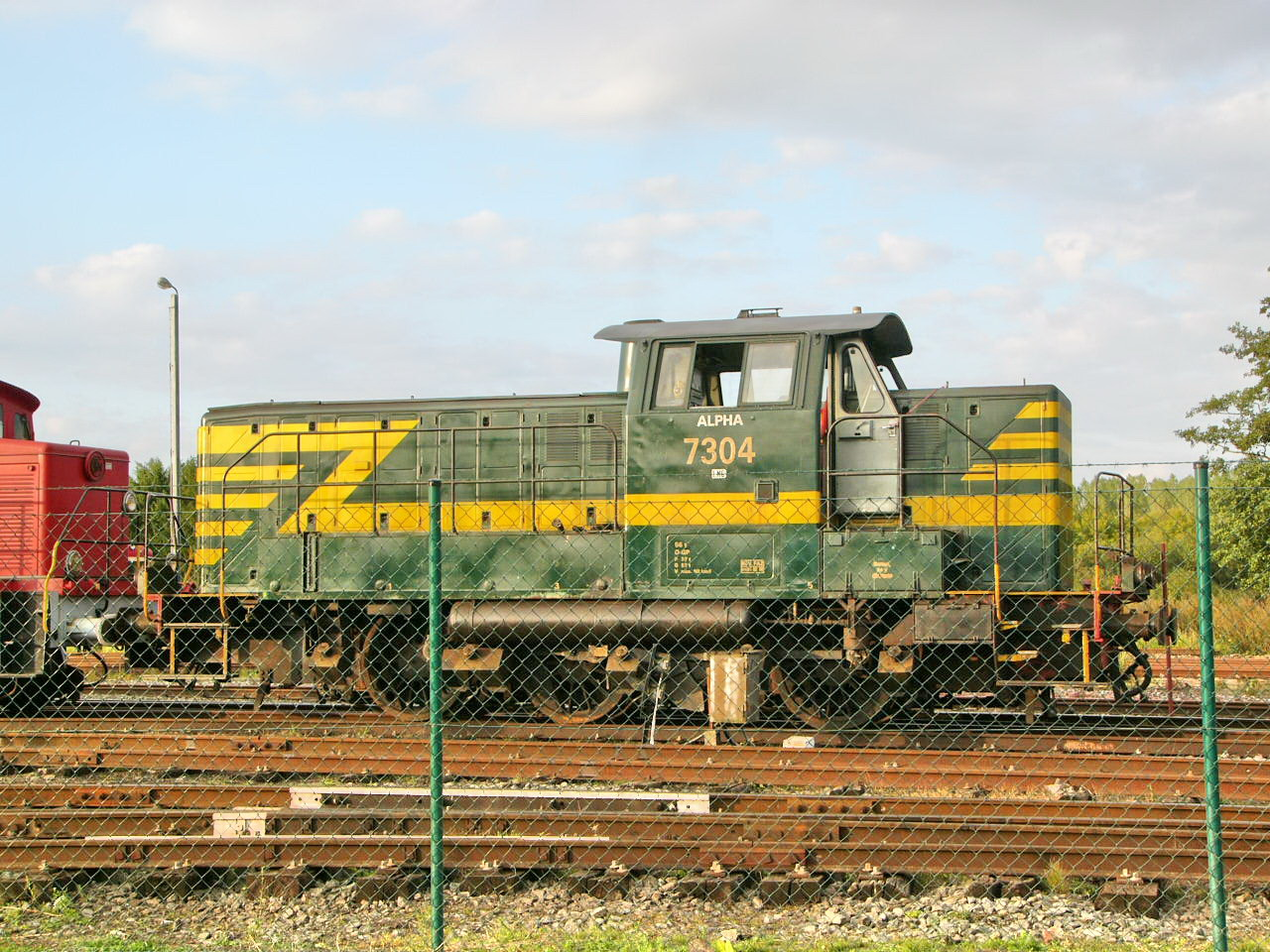
- Former NMBS/SNCB Class 73 loco 7304 at Mariemburg CF3V, 24 September 2005.
Type and origin
- Power type: Diesel
- Builder: BN
- Build date: 1965-1977 (three batches)
- Total produced: 95
Specifications
- Configuration
  - Whyte: 0-6-0
- Gauge: 1,435 mm (4 ft 8 1/2 in) standard gauge
- Driver dia.: 1,262 mm (49.69 in)
- Length: 11.4 m (37 ft 5 in) first batch 11.17 m (36 ft 8 in)
- Adhesive weight: 9.33 t (9.18 long tons; 10.28 short tons)
- Loco weight: 56 t (55.1 long tons; 61.7 short tons)
- Fuel type: diesel
- Prime mover: Cockerill 6TH695SA or 6T240CO
- Transmission: Voith hydraulic
Performance figures
- Maximum speed: 30 or 60 km/h (19 or 37 mph)
- Power output: 550 kW (740 hp)
- Tractive effort: 211 kN (47,000 lbf)
Career
- Operators: SNCB/NMBS
- Class: 73
- Numbers: 7301-7395
- Disposition: in service

The Class 73 is a class of diesel locomotives operated by SNCB/NMBS in Belgium.

The class formed the backbone of the NMBS/SNCB shunter fleet. Class 77s have replaced them but they are still to be found across Belgium. They were built in three batches: 7301-7335 during 1965–1967, 7336-7375 during 1973-1974 and finally 7373–7395 in 1976–1977.
