= Maizy =

- Commune
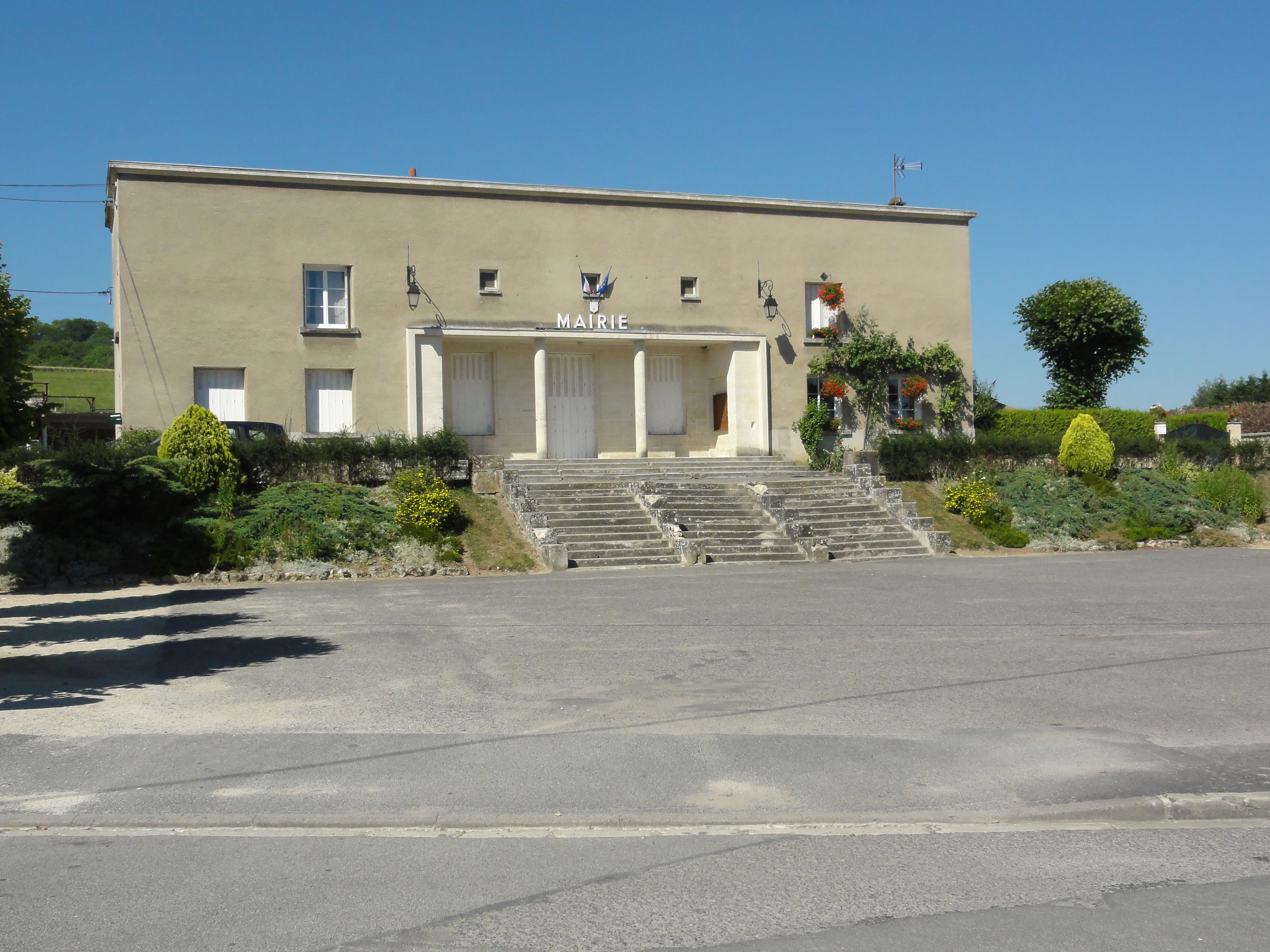
- The town hall of Maizy
- Location of Maizy
- Location within France Location within Hauts-de-France
- Coordinates: 49°22′39″N 3°44′06″E
- Country: France
- Region: Hauts-de-France
- Department: Aisne
- Arrondissement: Laon
- Canton: Villeneuve-sur-Aisne
- Intercommunality: Champagne Picarde

Government
  - Mayor (2026–32): Thierry Pierrot
- Area^{1}: 7.09 km^{2} (2.74 sq mi)
- Elevation: 84 m (276 ft)
- Highest elevation: 171 m (561 ft)
- Lowest elevation: 46 m (151 ft)
- Population (2023): 392
  - Density: 55.3/km^{2} (143/sq mi)
- Time zone: UTC+01:00 (CET)
  - Summer (DST): UTC+02:00 (CEST)
- INSEE/Postal code: 02453 /02160
- ^{1} French Land Register data, which excludes lakes, ponds, glaciers > 1 km^{2} (0.386 sq mi or 247 acres) and river estuaries.

Maizy (French pronunciation: [mɛzi]) is a commune in the Aisne department in the Hauts-de-France region of northern France.

== Population ==
Historical population
Year	Pop.	±% p.a.
1968	375	—
1975	407	+1.18%
1982	358	−1.82%
1990	394	+1.20%
1999	353	−1.21%
2007	400	+1.57%
2012	435	+1.69%
2017	411	−1.13%
2023	392	−0.79%
Source: INSEE

== See also ==
- Communes of the Aisne department
