= John Cockerill (company, 1825–1955) =

Belgian iron, steel, and manufacturing company

John Cockerill & Cie.
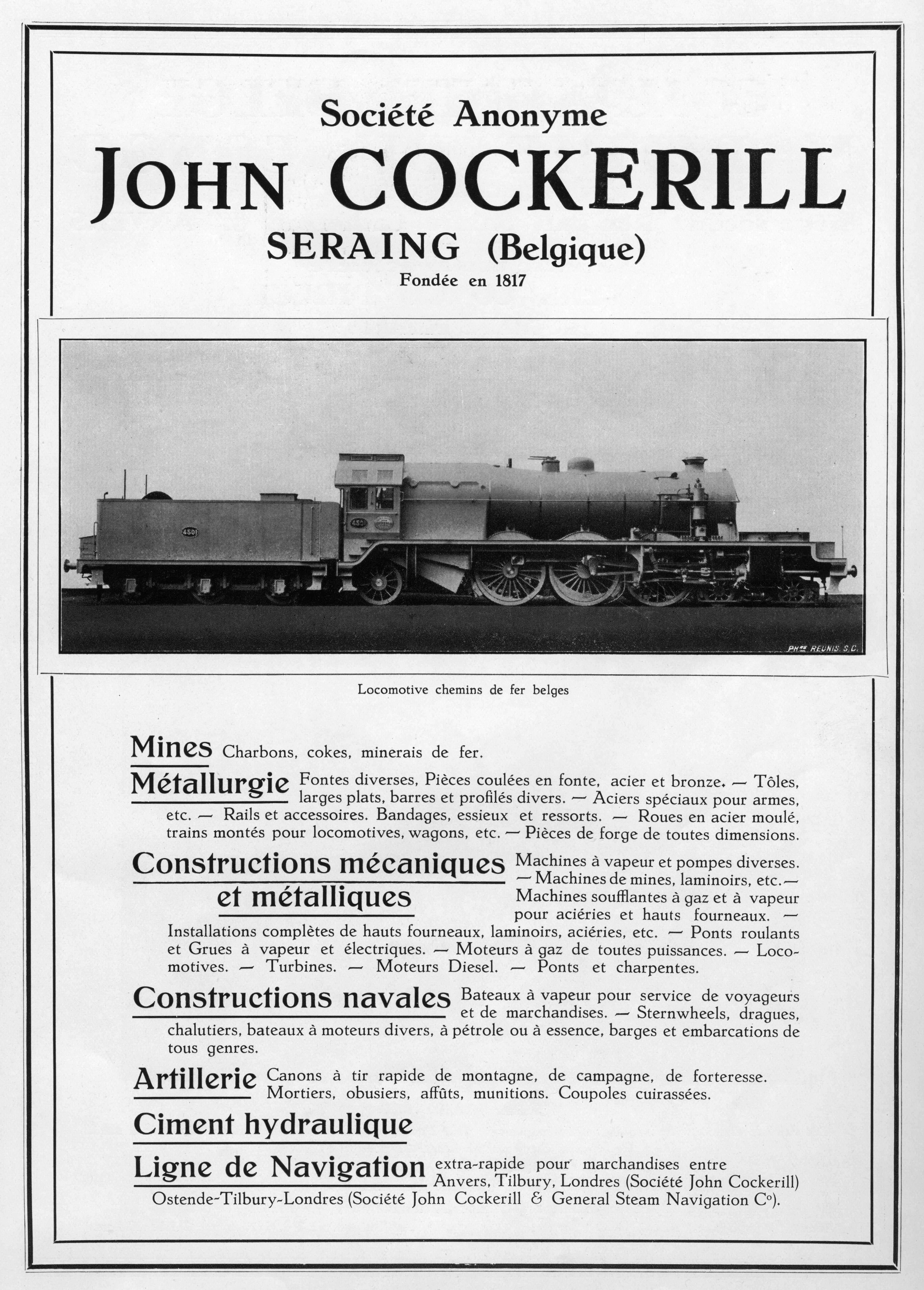
- Poster for SA John Cockerill, c. 1928
- Industry: Heavy industry
- Founded: 1825 (incorporated)
- Founder: John Cockerill
- Fate: Bought by the state in 1842
- Successors: 1842: SA John Cockerill; 1955: SA Cockerill-Ougrée
- Headquarters: Seraing, Belgium

John Cockerill & Cie. was an iron, steel, and manufacturing company based at Seraing, Liège Province in Belgium. It was founded in 1825 by English-born industrialist John Cockerill. It was one of the most notable companies to emerge in the early years of the Industrial Revolution in Belgium.

John Cockerill, a son of British entrepreneur William Cockerill, owned the company, and it was known as John Cockerill & Cie. However, John Cockerill died in Warsaw in 1840 after a business trip to Russia. Following his death, the company became state owned, and in 1842, it became known as the Société anonyme pour l'exploitation des établissements de John Cockerill. (Note: Also written as Société anonyme John Cockerill, or SA John Cockerill. In English, it is often referred to as the "John Cockerill Company".)

For much of its existence, Cockerill was one of the major iron and steel producers in Western Europe. It was a significant producer of derived products, including rail and railway locomotives, iron production equipment, and other large-scale iron and steel constructions.

In 1955, the company merged with Ougrée-Marihaye to form SA Cockerill-Ougrée. In 1981, it merged with Hainaut-Sambre to form Cockerill-Sambre.

== History ==
=== John Cockerill & Cie. (1825–1842) ===
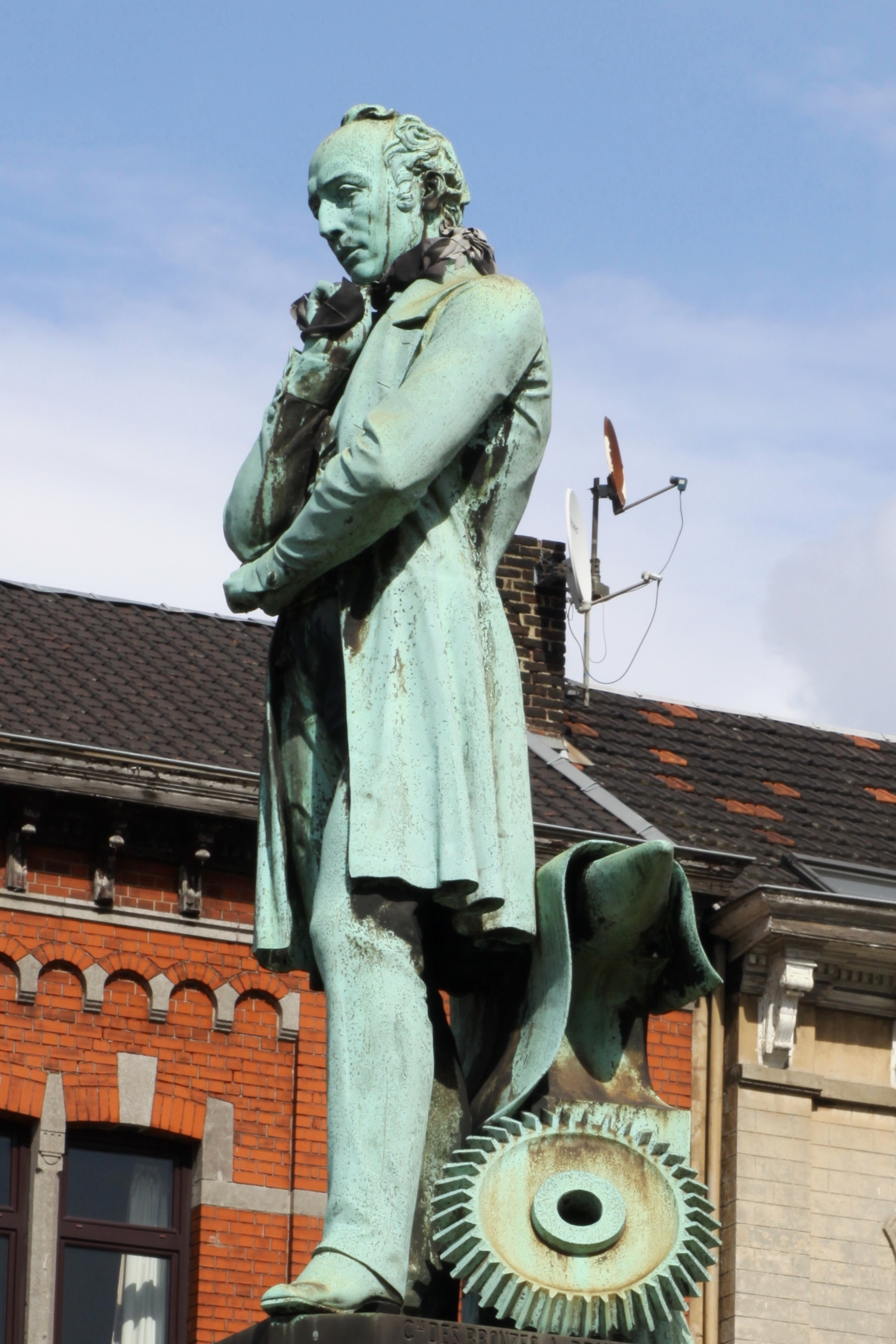
Statue of John Cockerill in Seraing

In 1799, the British-born blacksmith and mechanical engineer William Cockerill set up a textile-machinery factory in Verviers. In 1807, he moved to Liège and created a factory that constructed machinery for the carding, spinning and weaving of wool, as well as steam engines. His family from England joined him, and his sons John and Charles James Cockerill managed the factory in Liège.

After purchasing the former palace of the Prince-Bishopric of Liège at Seraing in 1817, John and Charles James Cockerill constructed an iron foundry and machine-building factory there. From its inception in 1817, the complex in the Liège region expanded under the control of the Cockerills, with a coke-fired blast furnace and manufacturing facilities for steam engines, railway locomotives, steam-powered blowers for blast furnaces, and traction engines. John Cockerill's business interests also expanded to include coal mining and collieries. The company rose to be the primary steel company of Europe, spurred on by its involvement in the construction of the Belgian railways.

William Cockerill retired in 1813, and his son John took over the company. In 1825, it became known as John Cockerill & Cie. In 1839, a banking crisis hit Belgium, and John Cockerill's company faced bankruptcy. In 1840, he traveled to Russia in an attempt to raise funds for the company, but he died of typhus on the trip home, leaving no direct heir. Faced with the prospect of closing an enterprise that employed 30,000 people, the state bought the assets, and on 20 March 1842, the company became known as the Société anonyme pour l'exploitation des établissements de John Cockerill.

=== Société anonyme John Cockerill (1842–1955) ===
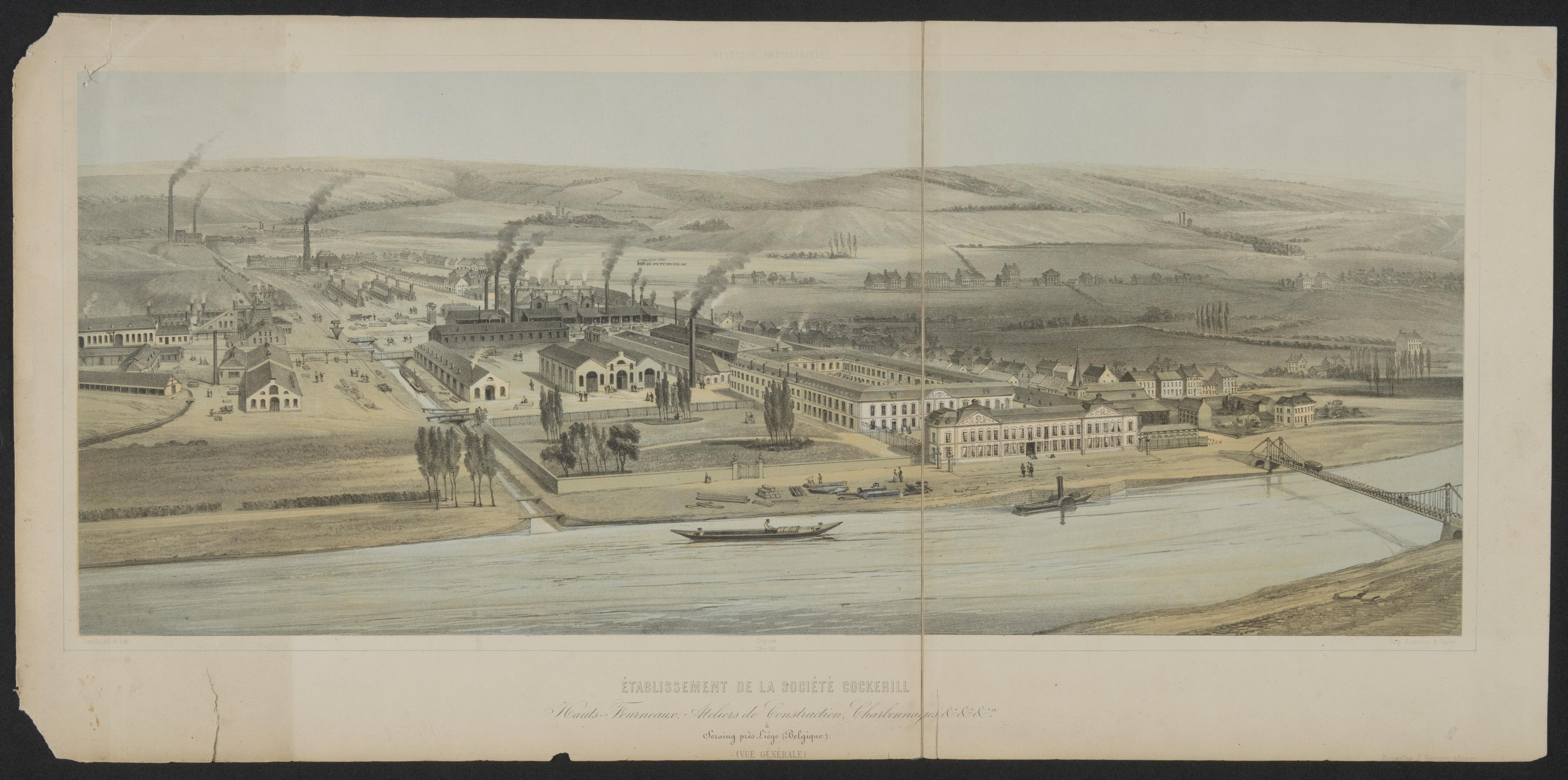
Cockerill's factories at Seraing, near Liège from La Belgique industrielle (1850)

Under state control, the company expanded further. In 1865 when the plant at Seraing was visited by a mission from Japan, it was 192 acres (780,000 m^{2}) in size and had two coal mines, as well as facilities for the manipulation of iron and steel, with boiler and locomotive works. A bessemer converter had been installed in 1863, and the company expanded into the production of transatlantic ships and bridges, ironclads, and tunneling machines.

In 1866 the company's director, Eugene Sadoine, began an expansion of the company's mining assets; developing nearby coal mines in Colard and iron mines in Spain. By 1872 the company's first Siemens-Martin converter began operation, and in 1886 it began to use the Gilchrist–Thomas process (basic process).

In 1945 the company took over SA Angleur-Athus, and in 1955 SA John Cockerill merged with SA Ougrée-Marihaye to form SA Cockerill-Ougrée.

=== After 1955 ===
The company Cockerill-Ougrée underwent further mergers as the Belgian steel industry was consolidated in the second half of the 20th century, becoming Cockerill-Ougrée-Providence in 1966, Cockerill-Ougrée-Providence et Espérance Longdoz in 1970; the name was shortened to Cockerill. In 1980 merger with Hainaut-Sambre produced Cockerill-Sambre, which through further mergers then became part of Usinor in 1999, Arcelor in 2002, and then part of ArcelorMittal in 2008.

The mechanical engineering part of the Cockerill, which distinguished itself from other Belgian steelmakers, became a separate company in 2002 when it was purchased from Usinor by a private consortium. As of 2010 the company operates as Cockerill Maintenance & Ingénierie (CMI) (previously Cockerill Mechanical Industries) and produces a range of products, including boilers, shunting locomotives, steel mill and other large-scale industrial equipment, and military equipment.

As of 2010 steel production in Seraing continued under the name ArcelorMittal Liège, producing flat carbon steel with processes from coking and blast furnace production of steel and continuous casting and hot rolling to coating of steel with zinc or plastic.

In 2011 all liquid steel production in the ArcelorMittal Liège division was ended, resulting in protests, strikes, and the temporary kidnapping of several ArcellorMittal executives as a protest against the closure. The company cited overcapacity and uncompetitiveness as reasons for the closure. However, a report by Syndex commissioned by trade unions contradicted the claims of un-competitiveness, claiming ArcelorMittal's reports had used biased accounting. Union officials called for the liégeois steel industry to be taken into ownership outside ArcellorMittal to protect it.

== See also ==
- Le Belge (locomotive)
