= Carels Frères =

Belgian manufacturing company (1839–1921)

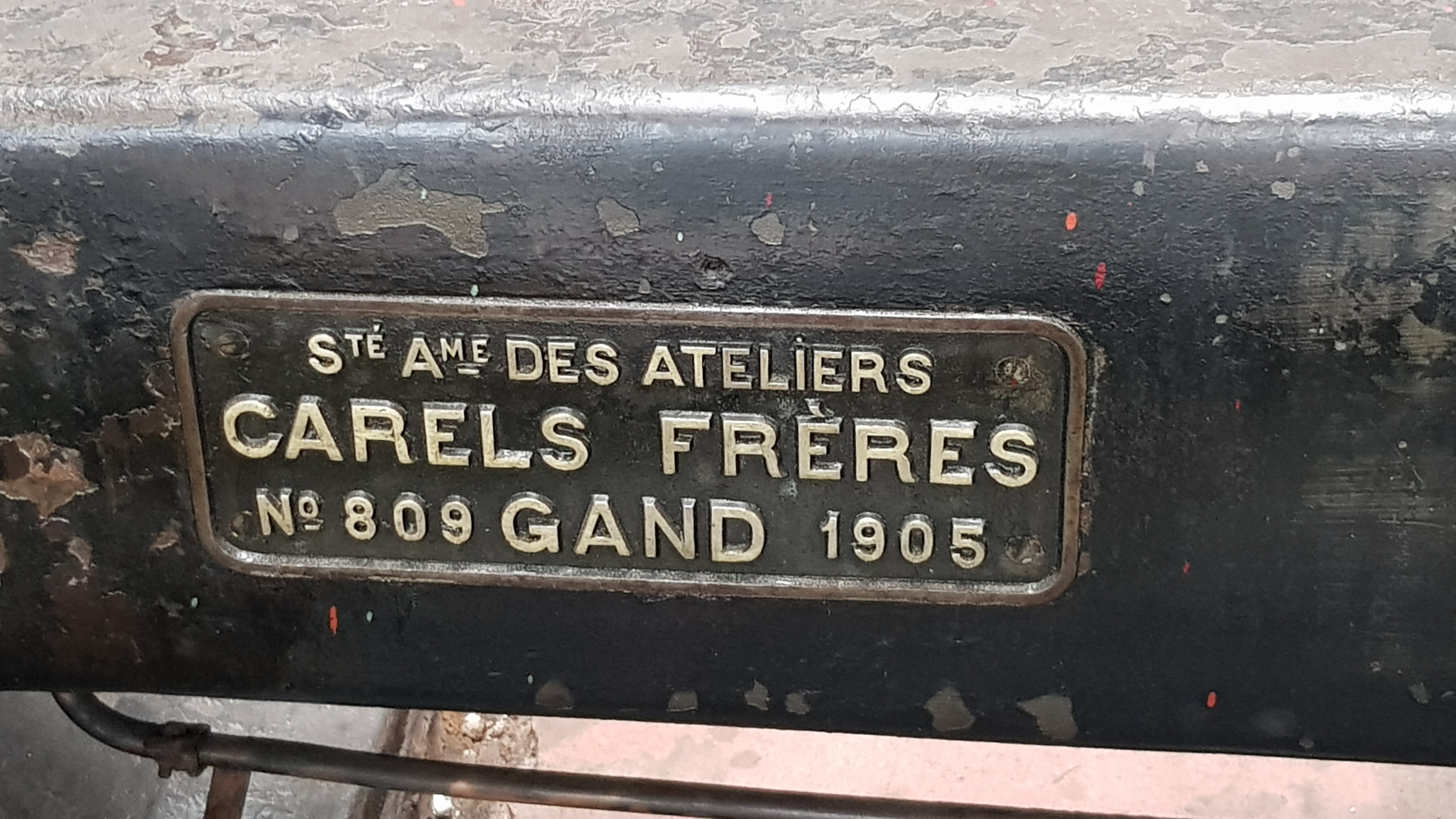
- Industry: Engineering
- Headquarters: Ghent
- Products: Stationary steam engines

Carels Frères, or Carels Brothers, was a manufacturer of stationary steam engines in Ghent, Belgium. For instance, in 1909, they supplied a 1200 hp tandem compound engine with super heater to Moston Mill, a cotton mill in Moston, North Manchester. It was their works no 875, with cylinders 30 and 53 in (762 and 1,346 mm) bore with a 3 ft 11 1/4 in (1,200 mm) stroke. Developing 1,200 hp (890 kW) at 90 rpm, superheated steam 200 psi (1,379 kPa) was supplied by Tetlow boilers. The flywheel, 19 ft (5,791 mm) in diameter, was provided with the sixty rope grooves that the full power would have required. The second half of the mill, however, was never completed, and in 1958 electric drives were installed, and the engine was scrapped.

George Watkins commented that this was typical of continent design. Six or more of Carels' engines were installed in Lancashire mills in the early 20th century.

Carels also produced steam locomotives, such as the Belgian types 32 and 32S.
