= Belgian State Railways =

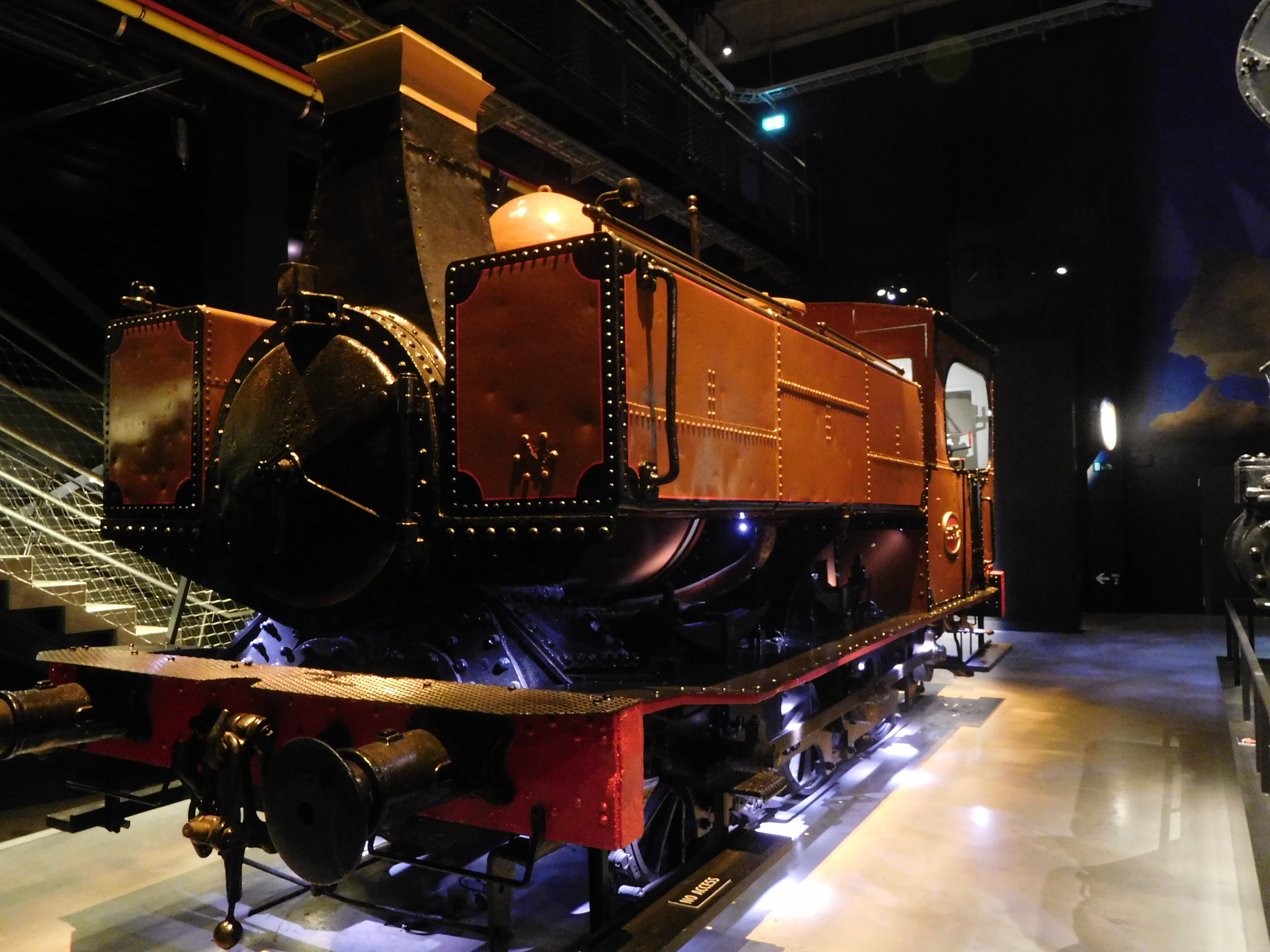
A Belgian State Railways Type 51 in restored livery at Train World (Brussels)

The Belgian State Railways (Dutch: Belgische Staatsspoorwegen [ˈbɛlɣisə ˈstaːtspoːrˌʋeːɣə(n)]; French: Chemins de fer de l'État Belge [ʃəmɛ̃ də fɛʁ də leta bɛlʒ]) was the original state-owned railway of Belgium. Established by an organic law of 1 May 1834, it began construction of its first line, between Brussels and Mechelen on 1 June 1834. This line, which was opened on 5 May 1835, was also the first steam-powered public railway in continental Europe.

On 1 September 1926, the assets and operations of the Belgian State Railways were transferred to its successor, the then newly created National Railway Company of Belgium (Dutch: Nationale Maatschappij der Belgische Spoorwegen; French: Société nationale des chemins de fer belges (NMBS/SNCB)), as part of a scheme formulated to eliminate Belgium's then excessive floating debt. Under the scheme, it was intended that Treasury bonds would not be repaid when they fell due; instead, they would be converted into bonds or shares issued by the NMBS/SNCB, or into fresh Treasury bonds, with the holders having the right to take either.

== See also ==
- History of rail transport in Belgium
- Rail transport in Belgium
- Train World
