= Hainaut-Sambre =

- Type: S.A. (corporation)
- Industry: Steel
- Predecessor: Usines Métallurgiques du Hainaut and the metallurgical division of Sambre et Moselle
- Founded: 1955
- Defunct: 1981
- Fate: Merger
- Successor: Cockerill-Sambre
- Headquarters: Couillet, Charleroi, Belgium

Hainaut-Sambre was a Belgian group of steel companies based in the Charleroi region, it was founded in 1955 by the merger of Usine Métallurgiques du Hainaut (based in Couillet, Charleroi), and the metal making division of Sambre et Moselle (based in Montignies-sur-Sambre, Charleroi).

The company absorbed another Charleroi based steel group Thy-Marcinelle et Providence in 1980 before being merged with the Liège Province based steel group Cockerill in 1981 to form Cockerill-Sambre.

A predecessor company SA Marchinelle & Couillet built locomotives at the Usines Métallurgiques du Hainaut which were used on industrial railways, and exported around the world. The locomotive builder was commonly known as Couillet.

In 1955 : Hainaut-Sambre's Director is Robert Baret, born 04 March 1897, Couillet, died 02 May 1981, Montigny-le-Tilleul, at the age of 84.

== History ==
=== Background ===
It has been speculated that the beginnings of industrialised iron working around Charleroi may date at least to 1000AD, with water powered forge, and furnace fed by charcoal. The first official record of an iron industry dates to ~1600 By the 19th century the metallurgical inventions of the industrial revolution had reached Belgium; in the Charleroi area Paul-François Huart-Chapel would be instrumental in the development of the steel industry as his contemporary, the naturalised Belgian John Cockerill was in the nearby Liège area. In the 1820s he introduced puddling furnaces then coke fired blast furnaces.

In 1828 the maison de commerce "Fontaine-Spitaels" bought land for the construction of iron works and in 1830 merged with Usines des Hauchies of Paul Huart-Chapel to form Fontaine-Spitaels et Cie. The company had, in addition to blast and reverbatory furnaces and coke ovens, licenses for the extraction of coal and iron ore. In 1835 the company became the Société Anonyme des Hauts Fourneaux, Usines et Charbonnages de Marcinelle et Couillet with a capital of 4.5 million francs.

Further expansion and development took place, with a mill for iron bar installed, then railways in the 1840s aiding the transportation of ore, the Siemens–Martin process introduced in 1888, in 1892 a Gilchrist–Thomas converter, and in 1894 a mill for rolling metal.

In 1906 the metal working and mining divisions separated; with the colliery at Marcinelle becoming a separate company, the metal division of the company became La Société Métallurgique de Couillet, renamed as Société Métallurgique du Hainaut in 1910.

In 1955 the company merged with the metallurgical division of Sambre et Moselle to form Hainaut-Sambre.

=== Hainaut-Sambre ===
In 1967 the group acquired 51% of the shares of Société des Aciéries et Tréfilerie de Neuves-Maisons - Chatillon, this subsidiary was acquired by Chiers-Chatillon in 1977.

In 1978 the company had a steel production capacity of ~2million tonnes pa. In 1980 it merged with Thy-Marcinelle et Providence. The mergers created a company that represented the majority of the steel production in the Charleroi area, which represented mostly long products.

Since the steel crisis of the 1970s the company had been in a poor financial state; in 1980 the company had total debts of 1,115million EUR and no capital, Cockerill was in a similar position. On 16 January 1981 Hainaut-Sambre and Cockerill announced that they were to merge the two groups. The company Cockerill-Sambre was formed as a result.

== Locomotives "Couillet" ==
The Société anonyme Usines Métallurgiques du Hainaut (English: 'Hainaut metal works company'), part of SA Marcinelle & Couillet, built steam locomotives at a plant in Couillet near Charleroi, so they are commonly known as "Couillet Locomotives".

The locomotives were exported and a few now operated on heritage railways. No's. 861 "John Benn" and 986 "Carbon" were built by Couillet for Decauville, for use in the works of the Melbourne Metropolitan Gas Company in Australia. They are now part of the locomotive fleet of the Puffing Billy Railway.

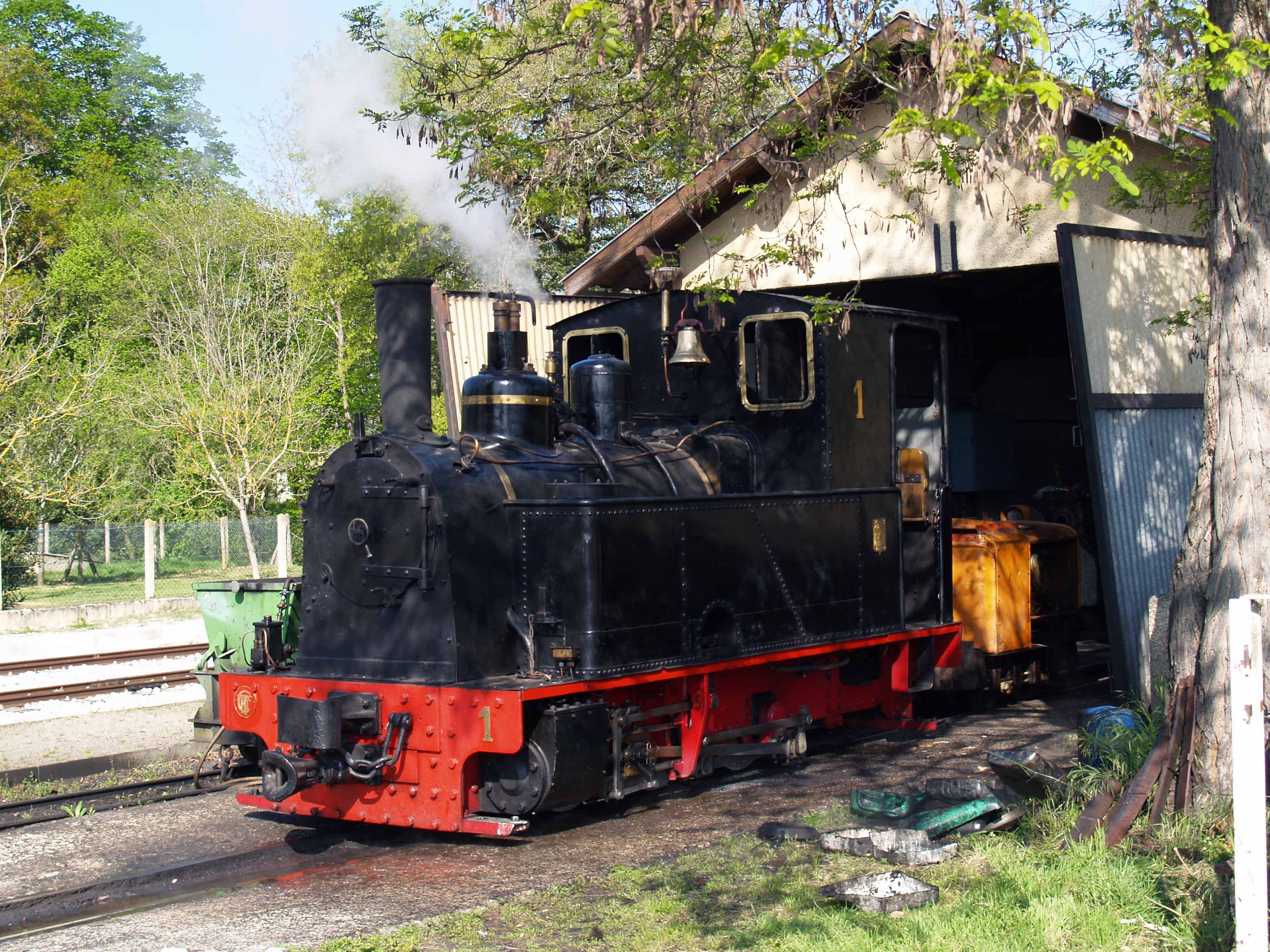
0-6-0T Couillet of the Chemin de fer touristique du Tarn

One locomotive on the Chemin de fer touristique du Tarn (Tarn Light Railway) in France is classified as a historic monument (Monument historique). In 2010, its 100th birthday was celebrated.
