= List of SNCB/NMBS classes =

This is a list of SNCB/NMBS locomotive classes, classes of locomotive operated by the National Railway Company of Belgium.

== Multi–system electric locomotives ==
Class	Photograph	Manufacturer (year)	Number	Status	Withdrawn	Power	Voltage	Notes
Class 11		BN, ACEC (1985–1986)	12	Withdrawn	2013	3130 kW (4200 hp)	3 kV DC, 1.5 kV DC	
Class 12		BN, ACEC (1986–1987)	12	Withdrawn	2010	3130 kW (4200 hp)	25 kV AC, 3 kV DC	Still used in services outside of Belgium
Class 13		Alstom (1997–2001)	60	In service		5200 kW (6975 hp)	25 kV AC, 3 kV DC	
Class 15		BN, ACEC (1962)	5	Withdrawn	2004	2620 kW (3513 hp)	25 kV AC, 3 kV DC, 1.5 kV DC	ex type 150
Class 16		BN, ACEC (1966)	8	Withdrawn	2009	2780 kW (3728 hp)	25 kV AC, 15 kV AC, 3 kV DC, 1.5 kV DC	ex type 160
Class 18 (old)		Alstom (1973)	6	Withdrawn	1999	4320 kW (5793 hp)	25 kV AC, 15 kV AC, 3 kV DC, 1.5 kV DC	
Class 18		Siemens (2009–2012)	96	In service		6000 kW (8045 hp)	25 kV AC, 3 kV DC	Part of the EuroSprinter family
Class 19		Siemens (2012)	24	In service		6000 kW (8045 hp)	25 kV AC, 3 kV DC	Part of the EuroSprinter family
Class 19 (Prototype)		BN, ACEC (1993)	1	Converted back to Class 21	2001	4500 kW (6000 hp)	25 kV AC, 3 kV DC	Converted from Class 21
Class 25.5		BN, ACEC (1960, converted 1973)	8	Withdrawn	2008	1740 kW (2333 hp)	3 kV DC, 1.5 kV DC	Converted from Class 25
Class 28		Bombardier (2007–2010)	43	In service		5600 kW (7510 hp)	3 kV DC, 1.5 kV DC	Leased, part of the Traxx family
Class 29		Bombardier (2010)	5	Withdrawn	2012	5600 kW (7510 hp)	25 kV AC, 3 kV DC	Leased, part of the Traxx family. Still used in services outside of Belgium

== Single–system electric locomotives ==
Class	Photograph	Manufacturer (year)	Number	Status	Withdrawn	Power	Voltage	Notes
Class 20		BN, ACEC (1975–1977)	25	Withdrawn	2013	5130 kW (6880 hp)	3 kV DC	
Class 21		BN, ACEC (1983–1985)	60	Withdrawn	2025	3130 kW (5000 hp)	3 kV DC	
Class 22		BN (Constructions Ferroviaires et Métalliques; 1954)	25	Withdrawn	2013	1740 kW (2333 hp)	3 kV DC	
Class 23		BN, ACEC (1955)	83	Withdrawn	2012	1740 kW (2333 hp)	3 kV DC	
Class 25		BN, ACEC (1960)	30	Withdrawn	2009	1740 kW (2333 hp)	3 kV DC	8 converted to Class 25.5 in 1973
Class 26		BN, ACEC (1964–1971)	35	Withdrawn	2012	2590 kW (3475 hp)	3 kV DC	
Class 27		BN, ACEC (1981–1982)	60	Withdrawn	2025	4150 kW (5665 hp)	3 kV DC	
Class 28 (old)		Baume & Marpent, ACEC (1949)	3	Withdrawn	1996	1985 kW (2660 hp)	3 kV DC	
Class 29		Baume & Marpent, ACEC (1949)	20	Withdrawn	1983	1474 kW (1965 hp)	3 kV DC	

== Diesel locomotives ==
Class	Photograph	Manufacturer (year)	Number	Status	Withdrawn	Power	Notes
Class 50		Cockerill (1961, converted 1969)	1	Converted back to Class 51	1980	2940 kW (4000 hp)	Converted from Class 51
Class 51		Cockerill (1961–1963)	93	Withdrawn	2003	1450 kW (1965 hp)	ex type 200
Class 52		AFB (1955)	17	Withdrawn	2008	1265 kW (1700 hp)	ex type 202
Class 53		AFB (1955)	20	Withdrawn	2008	1265 kW (1700 hp)	ex type 203
Class 54		AFB (1957)	8	Withdrawn	2008	1350 kW (1810 hp)	ex type 204
Class 55		BN (1961–1962)	42	In service		1360 kW (1823 hp)	ex type 205, max. 23 locos in service
Class 57		Vossloh (2000–2003)		In service		2240 kW (3000 hp)	Leased, Vossloh G2000 BB
Class 59		Baume & Marpent, Cockerill (1954–1955)	55	Withdrawn	2002	1275 kW (1710 hp)	ex type 209
Class 60/61		Cockerill (1964–1965)	106	Withdrawn	2002	1020 kW (1370 hp)	ex type 210
Class 62/63		BN (1961–1966)	136	In service		1030 kW (1385 hp)	ex type 212, max. 81 still in service
Class 64		Cockerill (1962)	6	Withdrawn	1983	1020 kW (1370 hp)	ex type 211
Class 65		BN (1965)	6	Converted to Class 75	1982	1035 kW (1390 hp)	ex type 213
Class 66		ABR (1962)	3	Converted to Class 71	1980	1035 kW (1390 hp)	ex type 222
Class 77/78		Vossloh (1999–2006)	170	In service		1150 kW (1540 hp)	Mixed traffic, both freight and shunting

The class 77 are used both as line engines in up to triple units for freight trains, and as shunting engines (see below). Commutation between operation at 100 kilometres per hour (62 mph) maximum (line) and 60 kilometres per hour (37 mph) maximum (shunting) can be done while the locomotive is halted.

== Diesel shunting locomotives ==
Class	Photograph	Manufacturer (year)	Number	Status	Withdrawn	Power	Notes
Class 70		Baume & Marpent (1956)	6	Withdrawn	2001	500 kW (670 hp)	ex type 271
Class 71		Baume & Marpent (1956)	5	Withdrawn	1980	550 kW (740 hp)	ex type 271
Class 72		BN (1956)	15	Withdrawn	1986	550 kW (740 hp)	ex type 272
Class 73		BN/ABR (1965–1974)	95	Withdrawn	2012	550 kW (740 hp)	ex type 273. Still used in services outside of Belgium
Class 74		BN (1965)	10	Withdrawn	2011	550 kW (740 hp)	ex type 274
Class 75		BN (1965)	6	Withdrawn	2001	1035 kW (1390 hp)	ex type 213
Class 76		Allan, Heemaf, Rochet–Schneider (1955–1958)	25	Withdrawn	2003	662 kW (890 hp)	ex type 276
Class 77/78		Vossloh (1999–2006)	170	In service		1150 kW (1540 hp)	Mixed traffic, both freight and shunting
Class 80		BN (1969)	69	Withdrawn	2003	475 kW (635 hp)	ex type 260
Class 81		Cockerill (1961)	3	Withdrawn	1980	485 kW (650 hp)	ex type 261
Class 82		BN/ABR (1965–1973)	75	Withdrawn	2010	475 kW (635 hp)	ex type 262
Class 83		Cockerill (1956)	25	Withdrawn	1994	400 kW (540 hp)	ex type 253
Class 84		ABR/Baume & Marpent (1955–1962)	70	Withdrawn	2002	475 kW (635 hp)	ex type 250/251
Class 85		FUF – Haine–Saint–Pierre (1965)	25	Withdrawn	2002	400 kW (540 hp)	ex type 252
Class 90/91		ABR, Cockerill, BN (1961)	60	In limited service		240 kW (321 hp)	ex type 230. Limited service since 2003
Class 92		BN (1960)	25	Withdrawn	1996	255 kW (341 hp)	ex type 232
Class 99							

== Electric Multiple Units ==
Class	Photograph	Manufacturer (year)	Number	Status	Withdrawn	Power	Voltage	Notes
Class 35		1935	12	Withdrawn	1988	968 kW (1300 hp)	3 kV DC	
Class 39		1939	8	Withdrawn	1978	840 kW (1126 hp)	3 kV DC	
Class 46		1946	1	Withdrawn	1988	968 kW (1300 hp)	3 kV DC	
Class 50		1950	25	Withdrawn	1995	735 kW (985 hp)	3 kV DC	
Class 51		1951	1	Withdrawn	1978	735 kW (985 hp)	3 kV DC	
Class 53		1953	15	Withdrawn	1995	735 kW (985 hp) 795 kW (1065 hp)	3 kV DC	
Class 54		1954	79	Withdrawn	1995	735 kW (985 hp)	3 kV DC	
Class 55		1955	38	Withdrawn	1995	735 kW (985 hp)	3 kV DC	
Class 56		1956	22	Withdrawn	1995	735 kW (985 hp)	3 kV DC	
Class 62		1962	60	Withdrawn	2013	735 kW (985 hp)	3 kV DC	
Class 63		1963	40	Withdrawn	2013	735 kW (985 hp)	3 kV DC	
Class 65		1965	20	Withdrawn	2013	735 kW (985 hp)	3 kV DC	
Class 66		1967	40	Withdrawn	2023	770 kW (1032 hp)	3 kV DC	
Class 70		1970	42	Withdrawn	2023	770 kW (1032 hp)	3 kV DC	
Class 73		1973	30	Withdrawn	2023	770 kW (1032 hp)	3 kV DC	
Class 74		1974	24	Withdrawn	2023	770 kW (1032 hp)	3 kV DC	
Class 78		1978	26	Withdrawn	2023	770 kW (1032 hp)	3 kV DC	
Class 79		1980	26	Withdrawn	2023	770 kW (1032 hp)	3 kV DC	
Class 75		1975–1979	44	In service		1360 kW (1825 hp)	3 kV DC	
Class 80		1980–1983	140	In service		1400 kW (1880 hp)	3 kV DC	
Class 86		1986	51	In service		770 kW (1032 hp)	3 kV DC	
Class 96		1996–1997	50	In service		1400 kW (1880 hp)	25 kV AC, 3 kV DC	
Class 96		1996–1997	70	In service		1400 kW (1880 hp)	3 kV DC	
Class 08		Siemens (2009–2015)	210	In service		2200 kW (2950 hp)	3 kV DC	Part of the Desiro family
Class 08		Siemens (2009–2015)	95	In service		2200 kW (2950 hp)	25 kV AC, 3 kV DC	Part of the Desiro family
Class 30		CAF 2029-2034 (planned)	180	Planned	2030		3 kV DC + Battery	Part of the Civility family

== Diesel Multiple Units ==
Class	Photograph	Manufacturer (year)	Number	Status	Withdrawn	Power	Notes
Class 40		1957	7	Withdrawn	1993	800 kW (1072 hp)	
Class 41		Alstom (2000)	96	In service		970 kW (1305 hp)	
Class 42		1954	6	Withdrawn	1994	400 kW (535 hp)	
Class 43		1954	30	Withdrawn	1994	400 kW (535 hp)	
Class 44		1954	10	Withdrawn	2001	356 kW (480 hp)	
Class 45		1954	10	Withdrawn	2001	356 kW (480 hp)	
Class 46		1952	20	Withdrawn	1994	166 kW (222 hp)	
Class 49		1941–1942	50	Withdrawn	1971	133 kW (178 hp)	

== Steam locomotives ==
Class	Photograph	Year	Number	Status	Withdrawn	Power	Notes
De Ridder		1842	9	Withdrawn	1890		
Type 1		1935	35	Withdrawn	1962	2500 hp	
Type 7		1921–1923	75	Withdrawn	1962	1600 hp	
Type 10		1912–1914	58	Withdrawn	1962	1950–2250 hp	
Type 12		1939	6	Withdrawn	1962	2260 hp	
Type 16		1907–1913	78	Withdrawn	1964	980 hp	
Type 18		1902–1905	134	Withdrawn	1964	980 hp	
Type 26		1945	100	Withdrawn	1960s	1600 hp	
Type 29		1945	300	Withdrawn	1960s	2000 hp	
Type 41		1905–1914	307	Withdrawn	1959	1000 hp	
Type 44		1902–1909	502	Withdrawn	1949	900 hp	
Type 51		1866–1904	370	Withdrawn	1961		
Type 53		1904–1927	437	Withdrawn	1961	700 hp	
Type 64		1908	168	Withdrawn	1965	1160 hp	

- SNCB Type 1: 4–6–2
- SNCB Type 7: 4–6–0
- SNCB Type 10: 4–6–2
- SNCB Type 12: 4–4–2
- SNCB Type 16: 2–6–0
- SNCB Type 17: 4–4–0
- SNCB Type 25: 0–6–0
- SNCB Type 26: 2–10–0
- SNCB Type 29: 2–8–0
- SNCB Type 31: 2–6–0 (Baldwin Locomotive Works)
- SNCB Type 36: 2–10–0
- SNCB Type 53: 0–8–0T
- SNCB Type 58: 0–6–0T
- SNCB Type 64: 4–6–0
- SNCB Type 81: 0–8–0
- SNCB Type 93: 2–6–0T (pr. T9³)
- SNCB Type 98: 0–10–0T
- No.2096

== See also ==
- History of rail transport in Belgium
- Rail transport in Belgium
- Wikimedia Commons: NMBS/SNCB current trains
