= Class 25 =

Class 25 may refer to:

- AB-25-class patrol craft
- Belgian Railways Class 25, electric locomotive
- Belgian Railways Class 25.5
- British Rail Class 25, diesel-electric locomotive
- EAR 25 class, steam locomotive
- L&YR Class 25, 0-6-0 steam locomotive
- DRG Class 25 (disambiguation)
- DRG Class ET 25, German electric multiples built for the Deutsche Reichsbahn in the 1930s.
- East German express locomotives operated by the DR after World War II:
  - DR Class 25.0, a Neubaulokomotive
  - DR Class 25.10, a trials locomotive
- New South Wales Z25 class locomotive, steam locomotive
- PKP class SM25, diesel shunter
- South African Railways Class 25 and Class 25NC 4-8-4 steam locomotives.
- V25-class torpedo boat
