= Belgian Railways Class 35 =

Electric multiple unit trains

NMBS/SNCB series 35
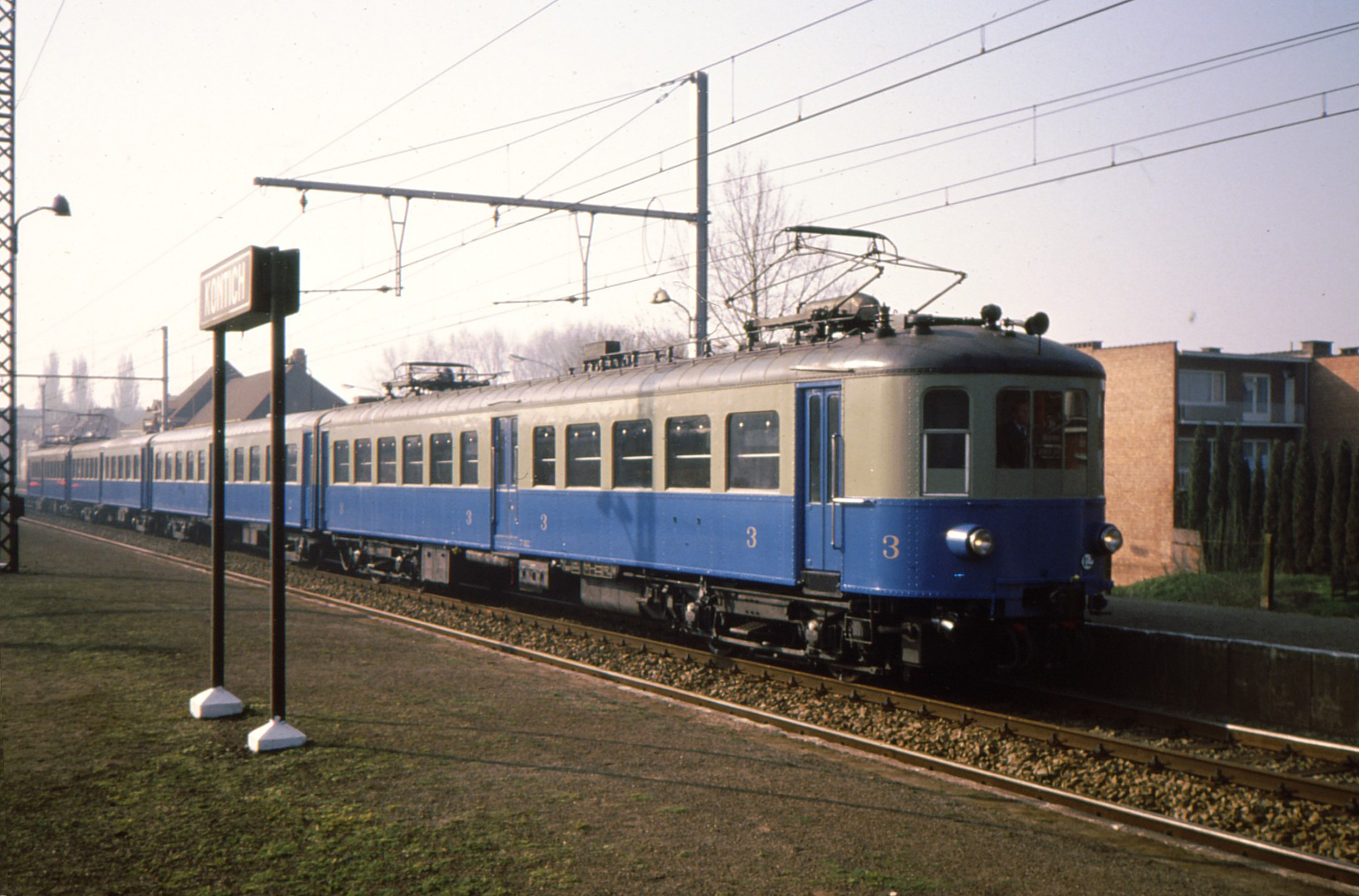
- Unit 12 on a special fan trip in 1990.
- In service: 1935–1962; 1967–1988
- Manufacturer: first 12 cars Société anonyme la Métallurgique, next 12 cars Ateliers de la Dyle
- Built at: Société anonyme la Métallurgique: Nivelles, Ateliers de la Dyle: Louvain
- Constructed: 1935
- Refurbished: 1967
- Number built: 12
- Number preserved: 2
- Number scrapped: 10
- Fleet numbers: 228.001 to 228.012 - A1 to A12
- Capacity: second and third class compartments
- Operators: NMBS/SNCB
- Lines served: Brussels and Antwerp

Specifications
- Train length: 91.05 m (298 ft 9 in)
- Width: 2.97 m (9 ft 9 in)
- Height: 3.88 m (12 ft 9 in)
- Doors: 6 per side and per car
- Maximum speed: 120 km/h (75 mph)
- Weight: 242 t (238.18 long tons; 266.76 short tons)
- Traction system: Electric -
- Power output: 968 kW (1,298 hp)
- Electric system(s): 3000 V DC
- Current collector(s): Pantograph
- UIC classification: Bo'Bo' + 2'2' + 2'2' + Bo'Bo'
- Coupling system: Henricot semi automatic coupler
- Track gauge: 1,435 mm (4 ft 8 1/2 in) standard gauge

NMBS/SNCB Class AM35 (Automotrice 35 French for Electric Multiple Unit (EMU) – 1935 [after their year of construction] - in Dutch they were MS35, the MS standing for MotorStel) were electric multiple unit trains operated by the National Railway Company of Belgium (NMBS/SNCB). First used in service on May 5, 1935 (a century to the day after the founding of the Belgian Railways) along the first electric line between Brussels and Antwerp.

Twelve Electric Multiple Units consisting of four carriages set ran at 120 kilometres per hour between the two cities.

== Technical Details ==
The EMUs consisted of two motorized cars at the ends and two infill trailers. Two manufacturers were selected for the power cars: 12 were built by the Société Anonyme la Métallurgique (Nivelles) and fitted with ACEC electrical equipment, the other 12 were assembled by the Ateliers de la Dyle (Leuven) and equipped by SEM (Société d'Électricité et de Mécanique).

The units were delivered in “blue and beige livery, fluid lines and detailed finishing” and proved quite popular with the travelling public. They featured an interior design by Belgian architect and designer Henry van de Velde, who was then artistic advisor for the Belgian National Railways. After World War Two, they were repainted in two tones of green, with large yellow visibility bands added shortly thereafter.

In 1939, 16 additional trailers were built in order to increase capacity during peak hours, creating 8 six-car sets. These new unpowered carriages were uncoupled and parked aside during low ridership hours.

== History ==
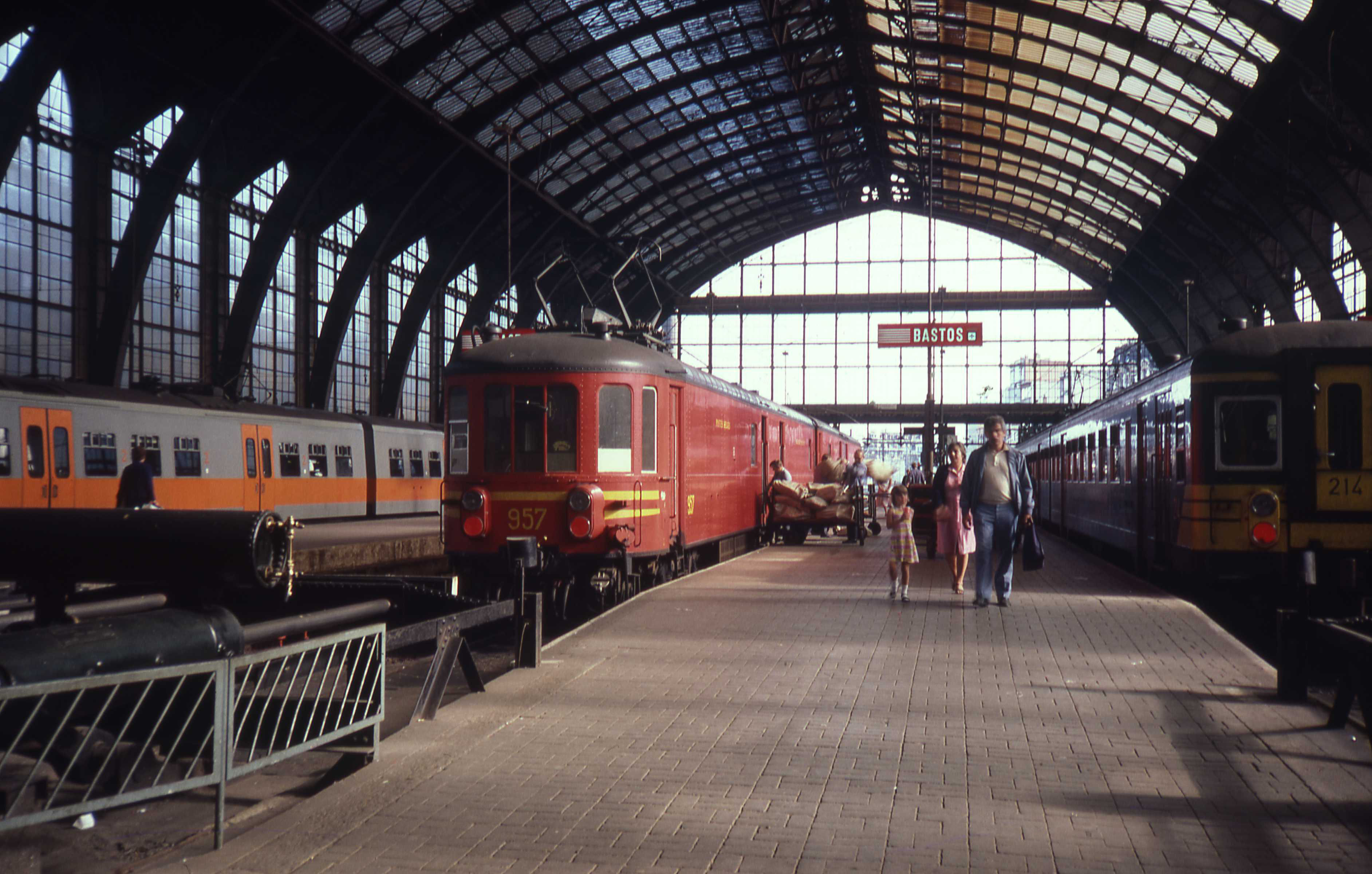
An AM35 mail carriage at Antwerpen-Centraal railway station in July 1985

The units were designed within the framework of the Universal Exhibition in Brussels in 1935, conceived as a chic and modern way to link Brussels and Antwerp. They were Belgium's first electric units. The AM35 EMU's were withdrawn from passenger service between 1959 and 1962 due to the heavy wear and tear they inflicted on the rails; several power cars were refurbished into mail trains for the Belgian postal service in 1967–1968. These mail trains were withdrawn in 1988.

== Preservation ==
A four car set was kept in working order by Belgian State Railways; the leading car was later put on display at Train World while postal unit 002 is in private hands.

Most of the trailers were converted into service vehicles (measuring coaches, cinema car and track worker accommodation). The cinema coach is preserved in Maldegem and some mobile track worker “camp cars” are still in use.

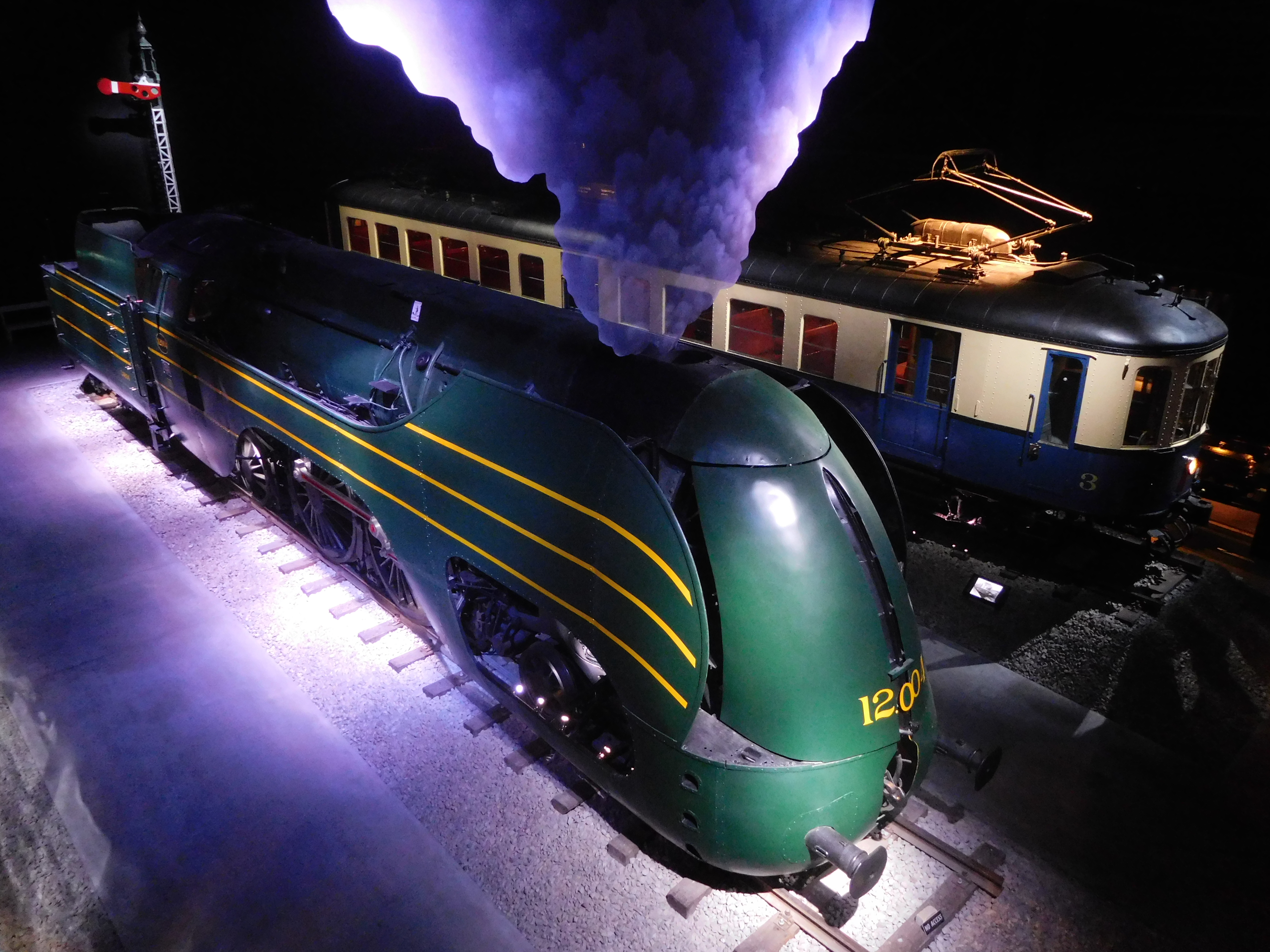
Front car preserved at Train World, behind 12.004.

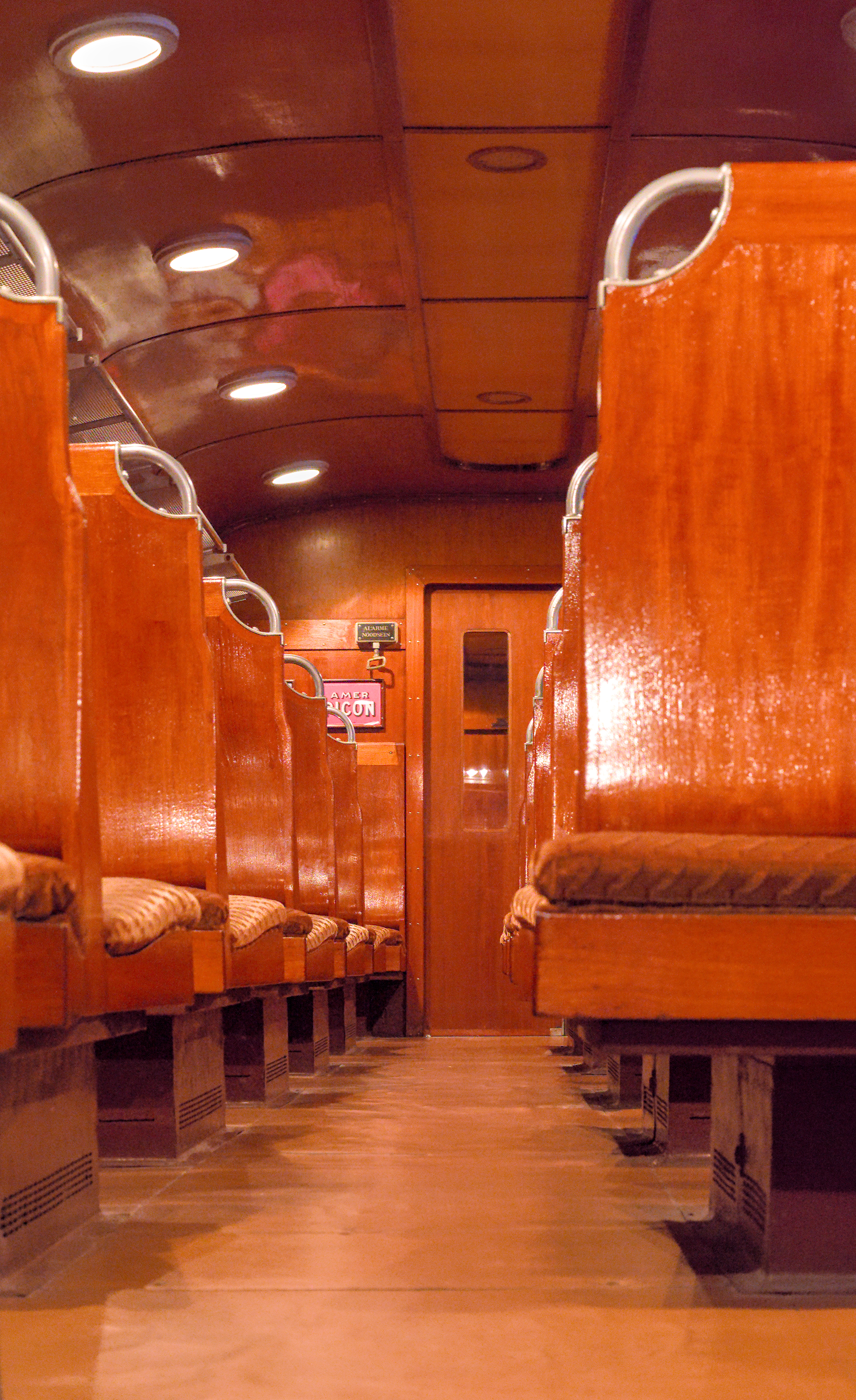
Third class interior.

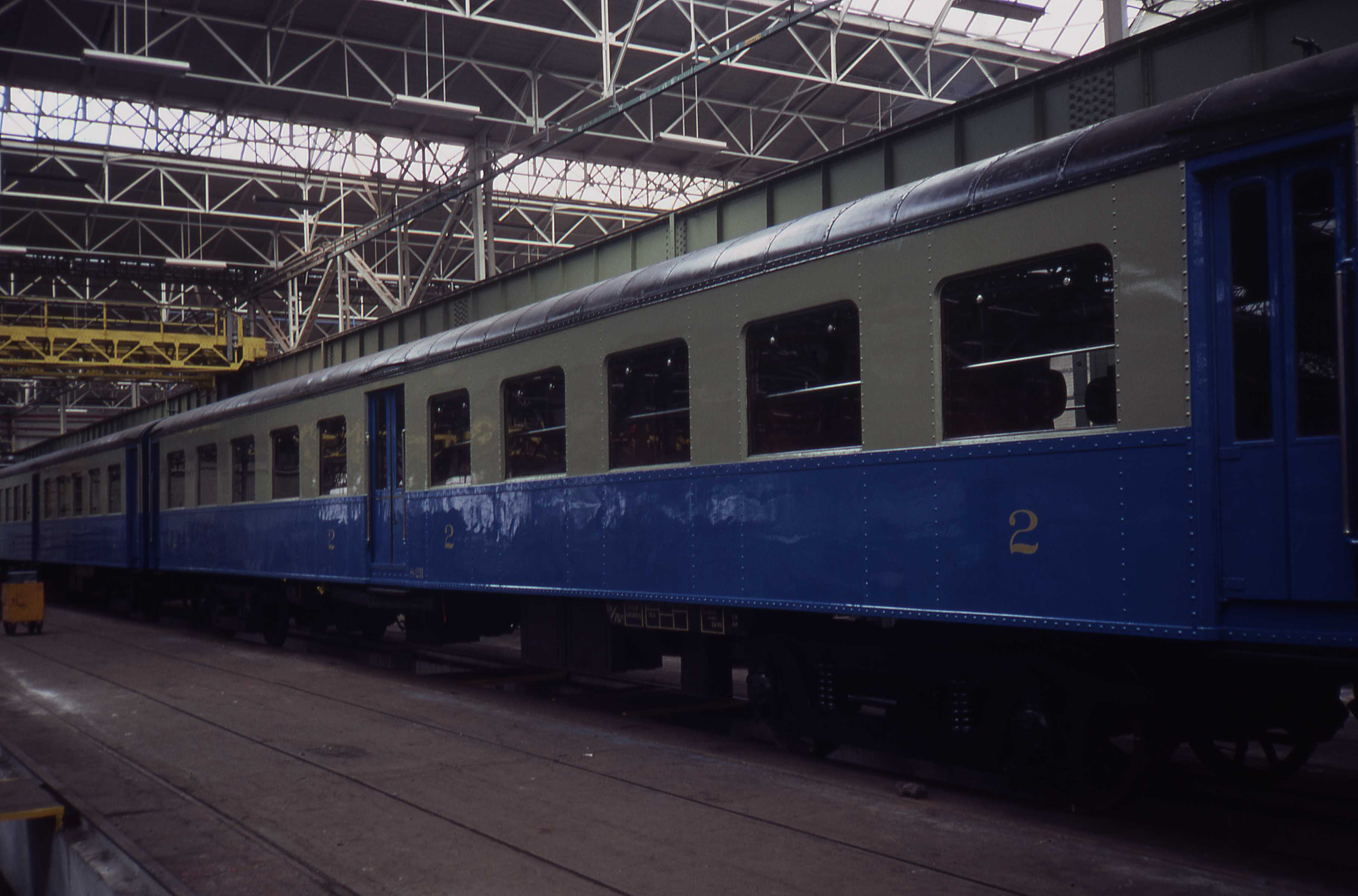
Preserved trailer during restoration.

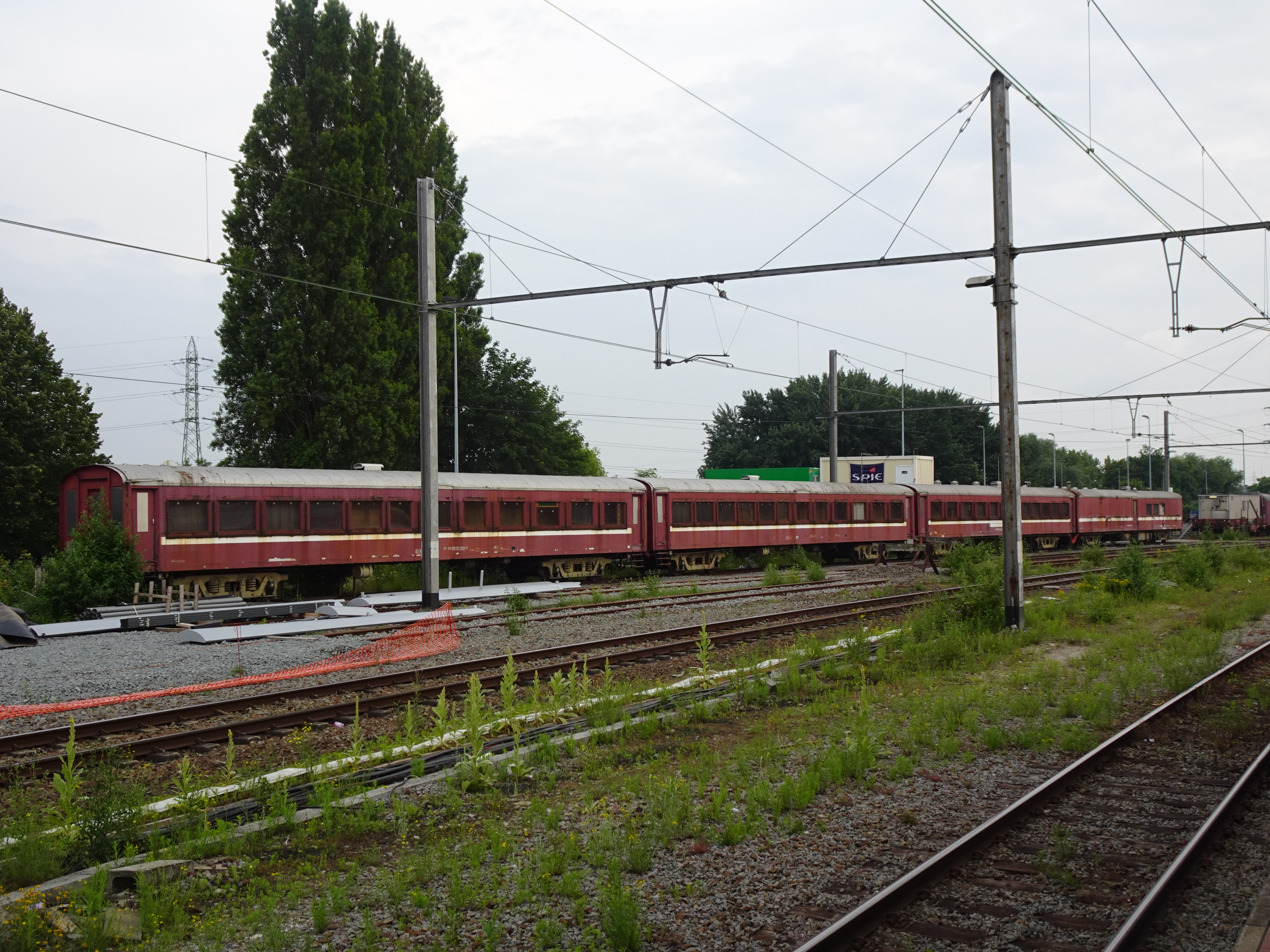
Four trailers housing track workers in Vilvoorde.
