= Belgian Railways Classical twin EMUs =

Electric multiple unit trains

NMBS/SNCB Classical twin EMUs
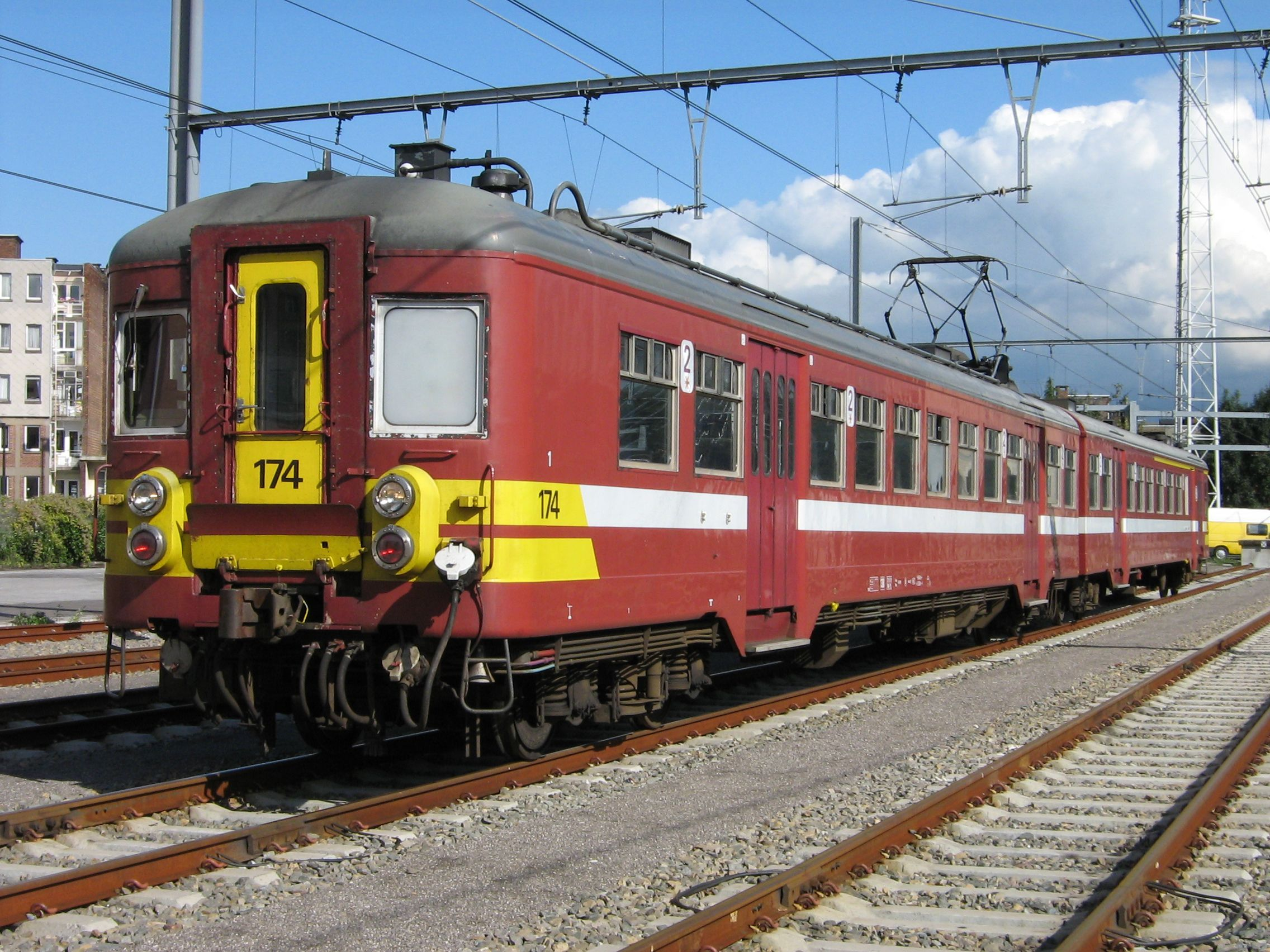
- NMBS/SNCB EMU AM 174 in Liège Guillemins Station

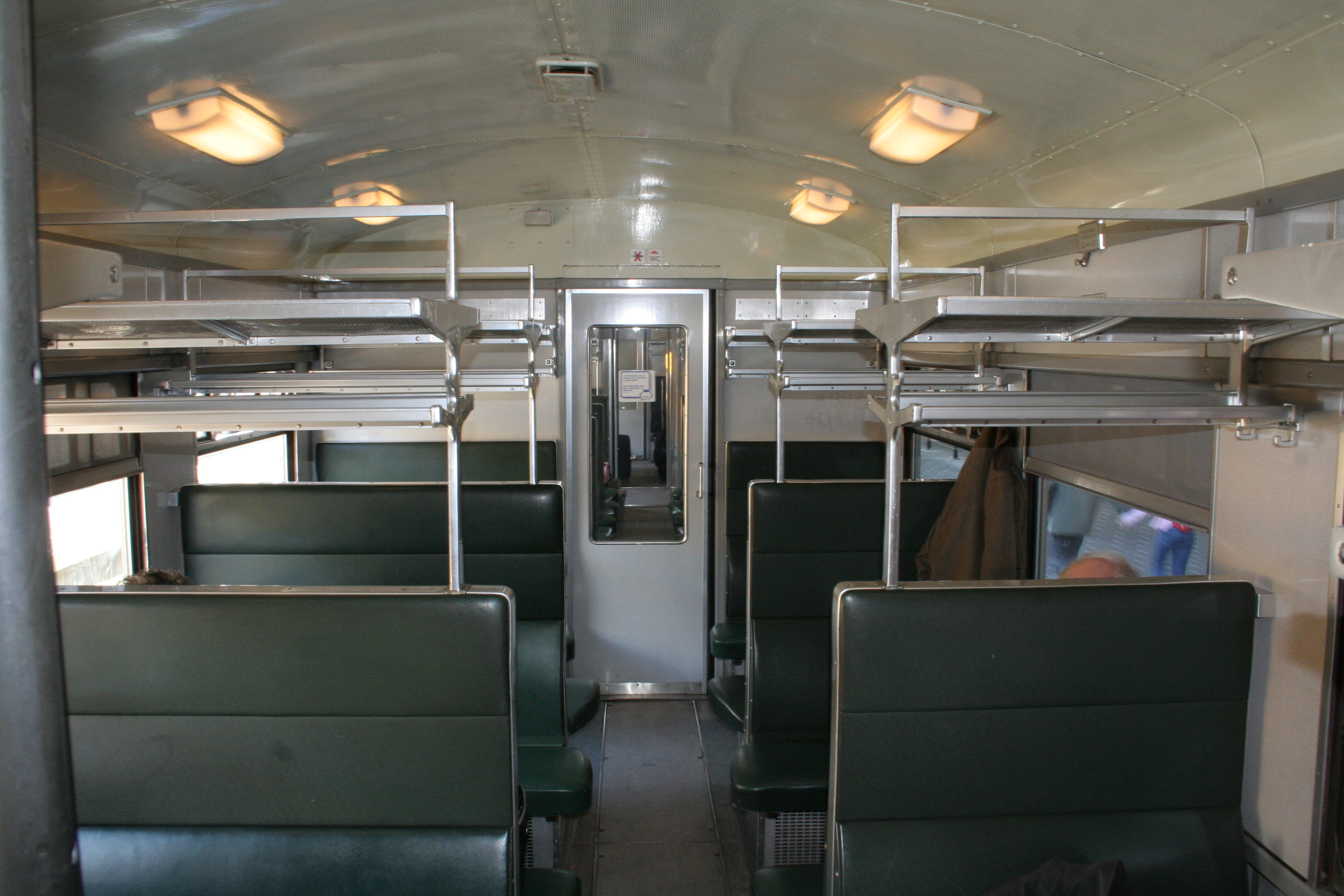
- 2nd class original interior
- In service: 1939-December 2024
- Manufacturers: La Brugeoise et Nivelles, ACEC, Ateliers Germain, Usines Ragheno
- Built at: Braine-le-Comte, Bruges, Charleroi, Mechelen
- Constructed: 1939–1980
- Refurbished: 1999–2008
- Scrapped: 1978–2024
- Number built: 497 (not in service at the same time)
- Number in service: 0
- Formation: EMC-EMS
- Capacity: 118 to 185, depending on series
- Operator: NMBS/SNCB

Specifications
- Train length: 44.4 m (145 ft 8 in) to 46.575 m (152 ft 9 5/8 in), depending on series
- Width: 2.781 m (9 ft 1 in) to 3.000 m (9 ft 10 in), depending on series
- Height: 3.767 m (12 ft 4 in) to 4.400 m (14 ft 5 in), depending on series
- Doors: AM39: Sliding doors Rest: Pneumatic folding doors 4 per side (excl. baggage door)
- Maximum speed: 130 km/h (81 mph)<b→r/> 140 km/h (87 mph) AM46 + AM66 and up
- Weight: 98.5 t (96.94 long tons; 108.58 short tons) to 117 t (115.15 long tons; 128.97 short tons), depending on series
- Power output: 620 to 840 kW (830 to 1,130 hp), depending on series
- Electric systems: 3000 V DC; 1500 V DC (Netherlands); Catenary
- Current collection: Pantograph
- UIC classification: (A1)(1A) + (A1)(1A)
- Safety systems: TBL1+ (units 642 and up)
- Coupling system: Henricot semi automatic coupler
- Multiple working: Within class (all series are interoperable) and with AM75
- Track gauge: 1,435 mm (4 ft 8 1/2 in) standard gauge

NMBS/SNCB Classical twin EMUs (also referred by their construction year – AM39 for "Automotrice 1939" up to AM79 for the last units from 1979; or MS39 to MS79 for the Dutch-language equivalent "Motorstel") were electric multiple unit trains operated by the National Railway Company of Belgium (NMBS/SNCB). They were the standard equipment for local trains under the Belgian standard 3000 Volts DC overhead lines, until they gradually replaced by the Class 08 Desiro Mainline EMU's starting from the early 21st century.

Classical EMUs were originally painted in dark green, with small yellow stripes surrounding the front lights. As those were considered insufficiently visible, the front door was also painted in yellow and the stripes were enlarged.

A subset of 22 EMUs was built with stainless steel body instead of (regular) carbon steel. This remains a one shot trial as the next generations were built with carbon steel bodies.

Another subset of 6 EMUs, built in 1970, were specifically adapted for airport service, with more space between seats and a huge luggage compartment. Although they were operated by railways staff, access was restricted to travellers holding valid SABENA airline tickets with a dedicated platform provided at Brussels Central Station. A blue paint scheme was also chosen to identify those EMUs. These units were retired in 2013.

In 1984, the Belgian Railways introduced a new transportation plan based on fixed-interval timetables (and the closure of many secondary passenger lines) called "Plan IC-IR." A new paint scheme was applied, based on a burgundy red color with a large white line surrounding the entire coaches or EMUs below the windows.

In 1999, classical EMUs built in the seventies were extensively refurbished, the program included comfort upgrade (interior replacement, sound system, closed circuit toilets) and repainting in the light gray livery with blue and red lines under the windows. Few units were still in the older green delivery when refurbished. The last 40 to be refurbished units received extra features (LED information displays, multi-service compartments for bicycles or standing passengers) for suburban "CityRail" (predecessor of the Brussels S Train) services.

== Withdrawal ==
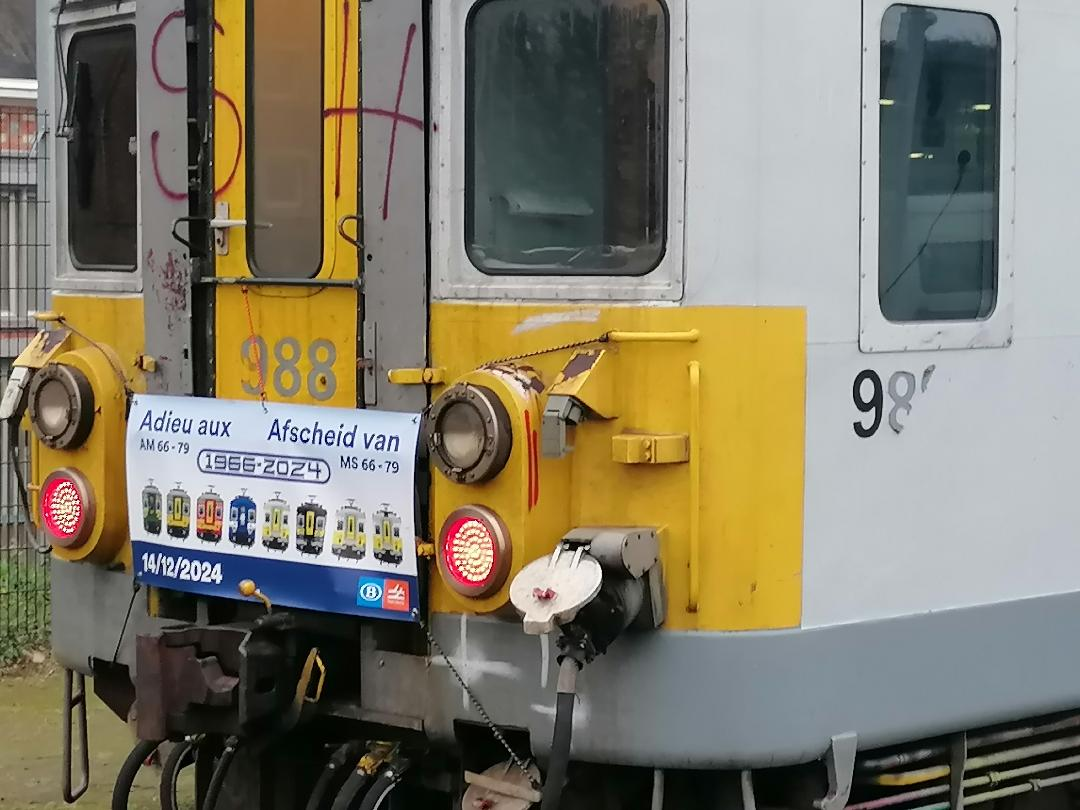
Farewell run of the classical EMU

The first withdrawals of the classical EMUs took place at the end of the 1970s.

In 2013, a hundred non-refurbished units were scrapped, after many of the Desiro Mainline Class 08 entered into revenue service.

The last unit was retired in a farewell run held on 14 December 2024. Unit 660, which was part of the farewell run, will be preserved at Train World in Schaerbeek.

== Technical specifications ==
These EMUs are driven by four 185 kW 1500 Volts DC motors. Units built before 1970 were driven by a Jeumont-Heidmann camshaft controller. After 1970, Thyristor drive were used instead.

Class	Image	Fleet numbers	Number	Top speed	Power output	Length	Mass/Weight (in tons)	Capacity	Withdrawn	Notes
MS39		001-008	8	130 km/h (81 mph)	840 kW	43.04 m (141 ft 2 in)	101 t (99.4 long tons; 111.3 short tons)	143 30 1st 113 2nd	1978	High-platform only units
MS46		009	1	140 km/h (87 mph)	830 kW	43.3 m (142 ft 1 in)	110 t (108.3 long tons; 121.3 short tons)	164 24 1st 140 2nd	1978	Prototype and pseudo-highspeedunit capable of reaching 140 km/h. High-platform only unit
MS50		010-034	25	130 km/h (81 mph)	620 kW	44.4 m (145 ft 8 in)	117 t (115.2 long tons; 129.0 short tons)	170 32 1st 138 2nd	1995	Almost identical to MS53. High Platform Units
MS51		501; Later 050	1	130 km/h (81 mph)	620 kW	45.78 m (150 ft 2 in)	98.5 t (96.9 long tons; 108.6 short tons)	161 42 1st 119 2nd	1978	Later renumbered to 050, the original 050 was renumbered 062. High-platform only unit
MS53		035-049	15	130 km/h (81 mph)	620 kW	44.4 m (145 ft 8 in)	116 t (114.2 long tons; 127.9 short tons)	170 32 1st 138 2nd	1995	Almost identical to MS50. High-platform only units
MS54		050-128	79	130 km/h (81 mph)	620 kW	45.28 m (148 ft 7 in)	106 t (104.3 long tons; 116.8 short tons)	185 31 1st 154 2nd	1995	050 was renumbered to 062 after the first 062 caught fire. 15 units were converted to mail trains for Belgian Post in 1988. 106 was used as a test train for TBL in 2004
MS55		502-539	38	130 km/h (81 mph)	620 kW	45.68 m (149 ft 10 in)	105 t (103.3 long tons; 115.7 short tons)	181 45 1st 136 2nd	1995	
MS56		129-150	22	130 km/h (81 mph)	620 kW	45.28 m (148 ft 7 in)	102 t (100.4 long tons; 112.4 short tons)	185 31 1st 154 2nd	2000	Stainless steel body, units were not painted
MS62 MS63; MS65		151-210; 211-250; 251-270	60; 40; 20	130 km/h (81 mph)	735 kW	46.57 m (152 ft 9 in)	101 t (99.4 long tons; 111.3 short tons)	180 28 1st 152 2nd	2013	151 was renumbered to 050 in the 90's due to test with asynchronous motors.
MS66; MS70JH; MS70TH		601-640; 641-664; 665-676	40; 24; 12	140 km/h (87 mph)	770 kW	46.61 m (152 ft 11 in)	101 t (99.4 long tons; 111.3 short tons)	180 28 1st 152 2nd	2024	From 665 on units were equipped with thyristors. In 2006–2008 all MS70TH sets, except 672, were refurbished to MSCR
MS70 Airport		801-806; Later 595-600	6	140 km/h (87 mph)	770 kW	46.61 m (152 ft 11 in)	121 t (119.1 long tons; 133.4 short tons)	118 32 1st 86 2nd	2013	Specially built for services to Brussels Airport-Zaventem, with extra luggage space.
MS73; MS74; MS78; MS79		677-706; 707-730; 731-756; 757-782	30; 24; 26; 26	140 km/h (87 mph)	770 kW	46.61 m (152 ft 11 in)	107 t (105.3 long tons; 117.9 short tons)	178 28 1st 150 2nd	2024	In 2006–2008 677 to 683 and 707 to 730, except 709 and 716, were refurbished to MSCR
MSCR 'CityRail'		960-999	40	Modernised MS70TH, MS73 and MS74. Retired in 2024.						

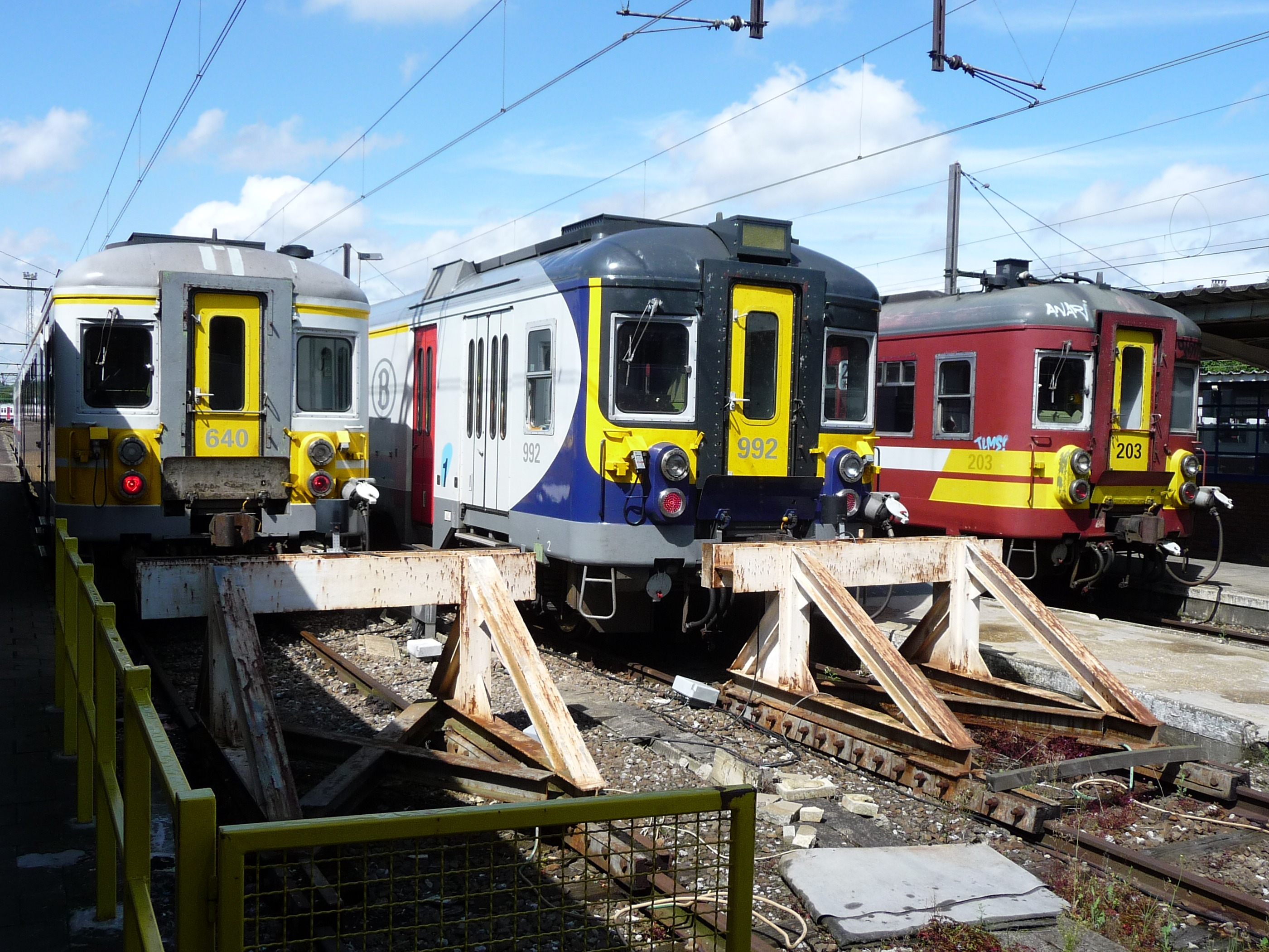
Three different painting schemes at Ottignies station.

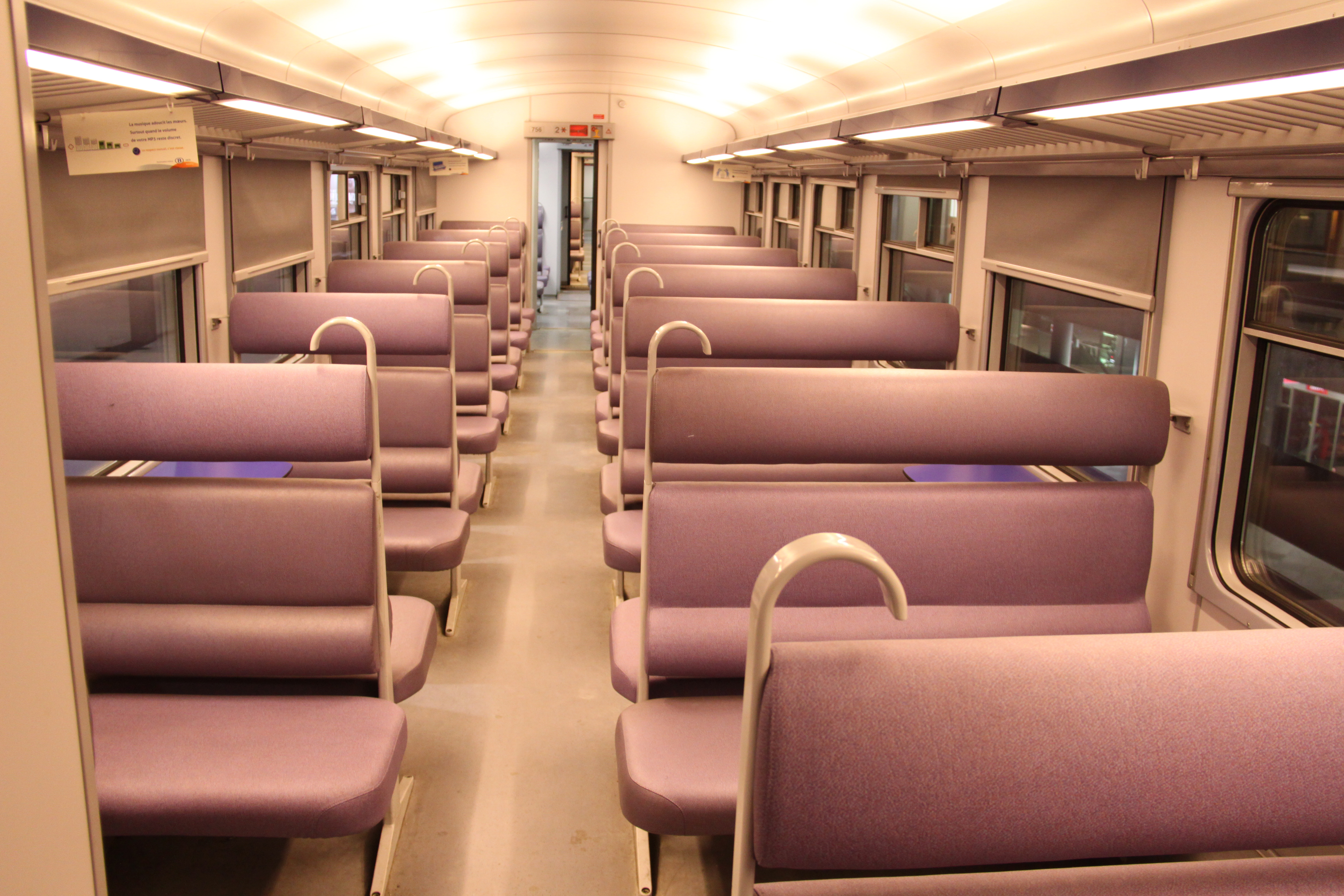
Second class interiors of a refurbished unit.

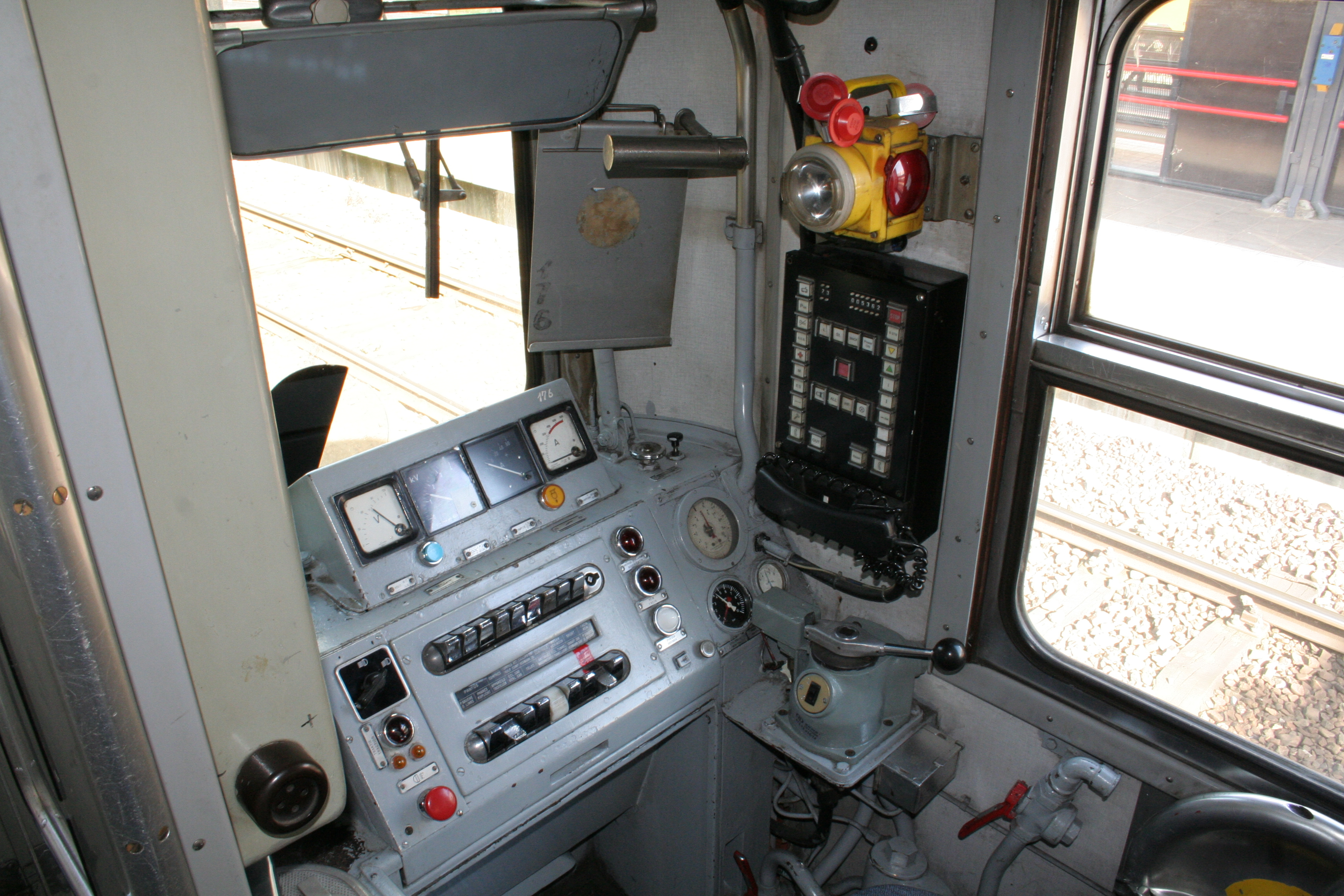
Drivers cab of an unrefurbished unit.
