= SNCB Type 26 =

NMBS/SNCB Type 26
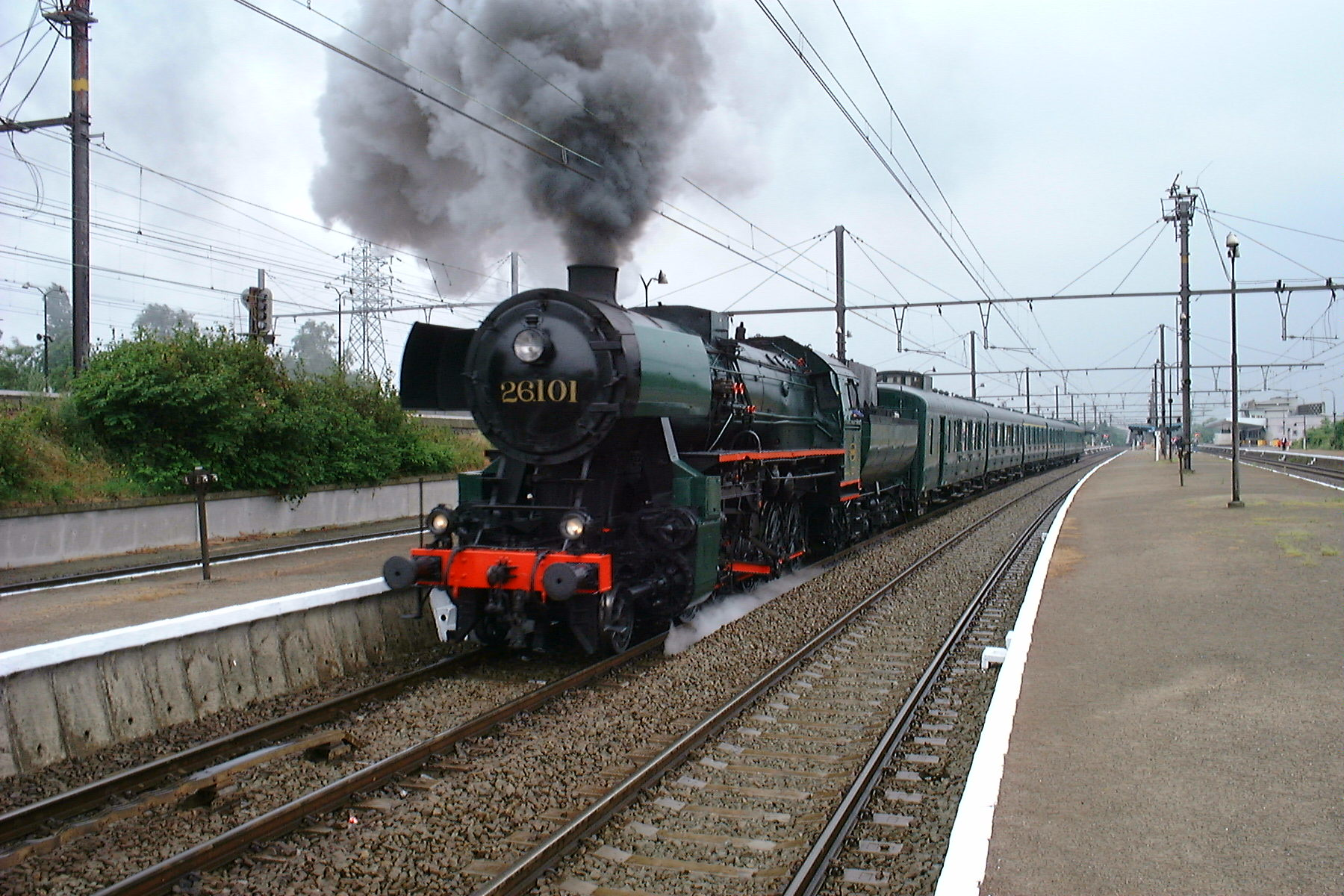
- No 26.101 with a train - see text.
Type and origin
- Power type: Steam
- Builder: Cockerill: 25; HSP: 25; SAFB: 25; Tubize: 25
- Build date: 1945–1947
- Total produced: 100
Specifications
- Configuration
  - Whyte: 2-10-0
  - UIC: 1′E h2
- Gauge: 1,435 mm (4 ft 8 1/2 in) standard gauge
- Leading dia.: 850 mm (33 1/2 in)
- Driver dia.: 1,400 mm (4 ft 7 1/8 in)
- Wheelbase
  - Axle spacing (Asymmetrical): 2,600 mm (8 ft 6 3/8 in) +; 1,650 mm (5 ft 5 in) +; 1,650 mm (5 ft 5 in) +; 1,650 mm (5 ft 5 in) +; 1,650 mm (5 ft 5 in) =
  - Engine: 9,200 mm (30 ft 2 1/4 in)
- Loco weight: 79 t (78 long tons; 87 short tons)
- Firebox
  - Grate area: 3.90 m^{2} (42.0 sq ft)
- Boiler pressure: 16 kgf/cm^{2} (15.7 bar; 228 psi)
- Heating surface: 178 m^{2} (1,920 sq ft)
- Superheater
  - Heating area: 64 m^{2} (690 sq ft)
- Cylinders: Two, outside
- Cylinder size: 600 mm × 660 mm (23 5/8 in × 26 in)
Career
- Operators: NMBS/SNCB
- Class: Type 26
- Numbers: 26.001–26.100
- Preserved: None
- Disposition: All scrapped

The NMBS/SNCB Type 26 was a class of 2-10-0 steam locomotives built between 1945 and 1947. Originally commissioned as part of an order for 200 DRB Class 52 Kriegslokomotiven placed by the Deutsche Reichsbahn (DRG) with Belgian locomotive manufacturers in 1943, the 100 members of the Type 26 class were completed for the National Railway Company of Belgium (NMBS/SNCB) following the liberation of Belgium late in 1944.

Ten members of the class were quickly sold to Luxembourg to become Société Nationale des Chemins de Fer Luxembourgeois (CFL) 5601 to 5610.

No members of the class have been preserved. However, two former polish Ty2s has been turned into class 26s. The railway preservation organisation TSP-PFT acquired No. Ty2-3554, restored it to resemble its Type 26 counterparts, numbered it 26.101, and now uses it to haul special trains for enthusiasts. Another engine, No. Ty2-7173, which worked at the Nene Valley Railway before being sold and is now located Oostmalle, Belgium as No. 26.102.

== See also ==
- History of rail transport in Belgium
- List of SNCB/NMBS classes
- Rail transport in Belgium
