= Belgian State Railways Type 7 =

Class of 4-6-0 locomotives

Belgian State Railways Type 7 (ex Type 8 bis)
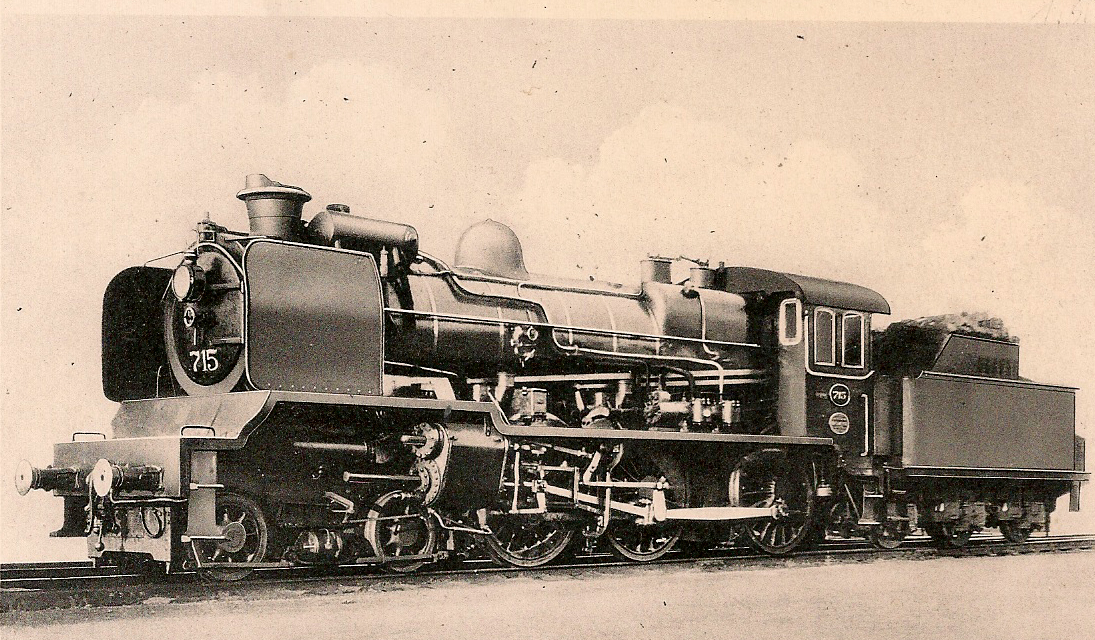
- Belgian State Railways Type 7 (ex Type 8 bis)
Type and origin
- Power type: Steam
- Builder: Various
- Build date: 1921–1924
- Total produced: 75
Specifications
- Configuration
  - Whyte: 4-6-0
  - UIC: 2′C h4
- Gauge: 1,435 mm (4 ft 8 1/2 in) standard gauge
- Driver dia.: 1,800 mm (70.87 in)
- Wheelbase: 8,800 mm (346.46 in)
- Loco weight: 76.5 tonnes (75.3 long tons; 84.3 short tons)
- Firebox
  - Grate area: 3.08 m^{2} (33.2 sq ft)
- Boiler pressure: 16 atm (1.62 MPa; 235 psi)
- Heating surface: 160 m^{2} (1,700 sq ft)
- Superheater
  - Heating area: 54.8 m^{2} (590 sq ft)
- Cylinders: Four
- Cylinder size: 400 mm × 640 mm (15.75 in × 25.20 in); 600 mm × 640 mm (23.62 in × 25.20 in)
Career
- Operators: Belgian State Railways; NMBS/SNCB
- Class: Type 7 (ex Type 8 bis)
- Numbers: 4601–4675; 700–774; 7.001–7.074
- Withdrawn: 1954–1962
- Preserved: One: 7.039
- Disposition: One preserved, remainder scrapped

The Belgian State Railways Type 7 (originally the Type 8 bis), later known as the NMBS/SNCB Type 7, was a class of 4-6-0 compound locomotives built between 1921 and 1924.

The class was used to work heavy passenger trains operated by the Belgian State Railways, and its successor, the National Railway Company of Belgium (NMBS/SNCB), which was established in 1926.

One member of the class, no. 7.039, has been preserved by the NMBS/SNCB for display at Train World, the Belgian national railway museum.

== See also ==
- History of rail transport in Belgium
- List of SNCB/NMBS classes
- Rail transport in Belgium
