= SNCB Type 29 =

Class of 2-8-0 locomotives

NMBS/SNCB Type 29
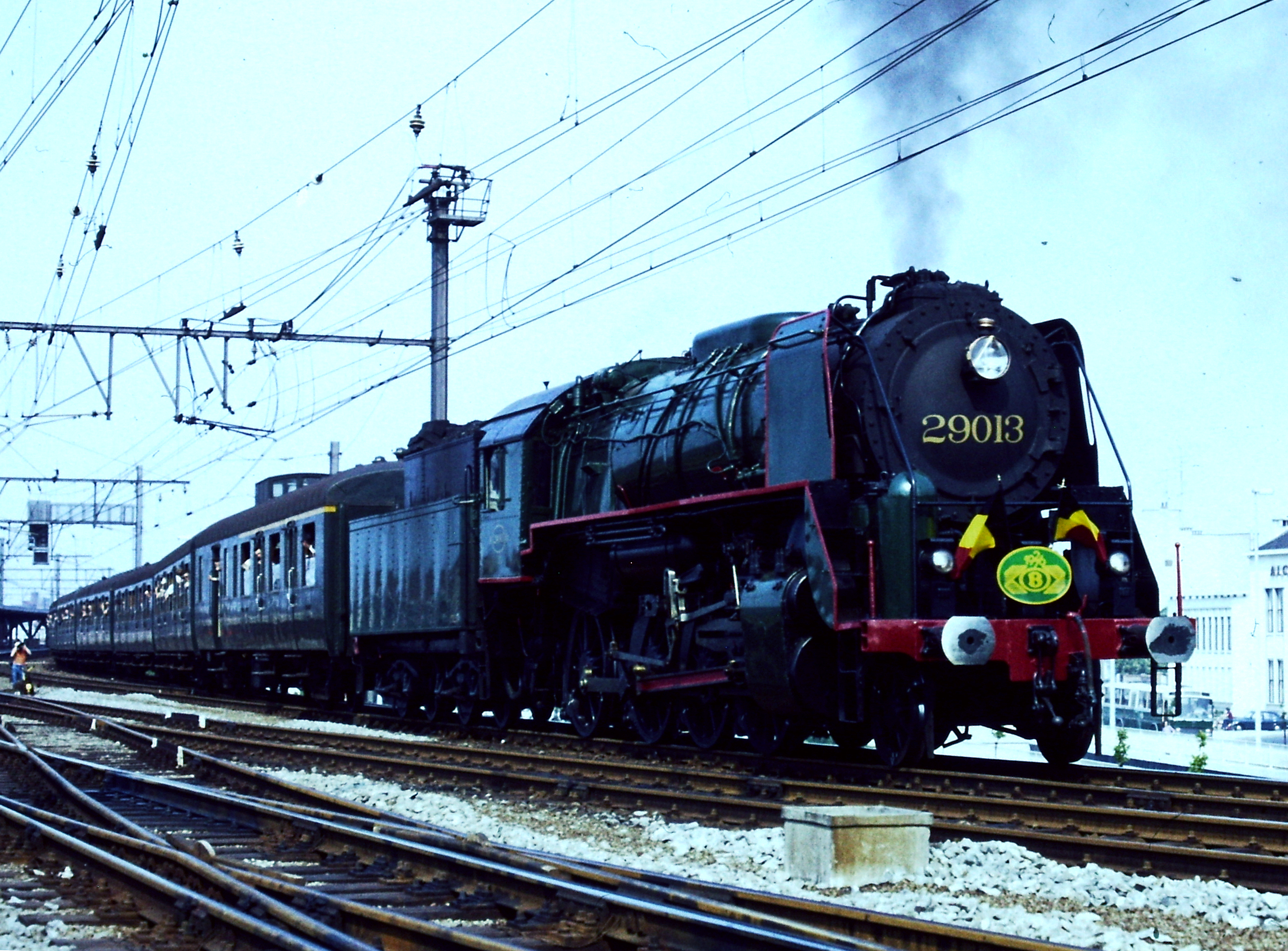
- Preserved 29.013 in 1975.
Type and origin
- Power type: Steam
- Builder: Montreal Locomotive Works: 160; American Locomotive Company: 80; Canadian Locomotive Company: 60
- Serial number: MLW: 74498–74657; ALCO: 74707–74785; CLC: 2288–2347
- Build date: 1945–46
- Total produced: 300
Specifications
- Configuration
  - Whyte: 2-8-0
  - UIC: 1′D h2
- Gauge: 1,435 mm (4 ft 8 1/2 in) standard gauge
- Driver dia.: 1,520 mm (59.84 in)
- Wheelbase: 8,407 mm (27 ft 7 in)
- Loco weight: 84.5 tonnes (83.2 long tons; 93.1 short tons)
- Firebox
  - Grate area: 4.40 m^{2} (47.4 sq ft)
- Boiler pressure: 15.75 atm (1.60 MPa; 231 psi)
- Heating surface: 183 m^{2} (1,970 sq ft)
- Superheater
  - Heating area: 73 m^{2} (790 sq ft)
- Cylinders: Two (external)
- Cylinder size: 22 in × 28 in (558.80 mm × 711.20 mm)
Performance figures
- Power output: 2,000 CV (1,470 kW; 1,970 hp)
Career
- Operators: NMBS/SNCB
- Class: Type 29
- Numbers: 29.001–29.300
- Preserved: Two: 29.013 & 29.164
- Disposition: Two preserved, remainder scrapped

The NMBS/SNCB Type 29 was a class of 2-8-0 "Consolidation" type steam locomotives built between 1945 and 1946. The class was ordered and used to help revive the operations of the National Railway Company of Belgium (NMBS/SNCB) following World War II. The locomotives were built in Canada and the United States, and supplied to Belgium under the auspices of what later became known as the Marshall Plan.

Two members of the class, no. 29.013 & 29.164, have been preserved by the NMBS/SNCB. 29.013 for display at Train World, the Belgian national railway museum at Schaerbeek railway station in north-central Brussels, and 29.164 at a depot near Haine-Saint-Pierre, surviving as mobile steam heater A621.904.

== See also ==
- History of rail transport in Belgium
- List of SNCB/NMBS classes
- Rail transport in Belgium
- China Railways KD7
