= SNCB Type 64 =

Class of steam locomotives

NMBS/SNCB Type 64
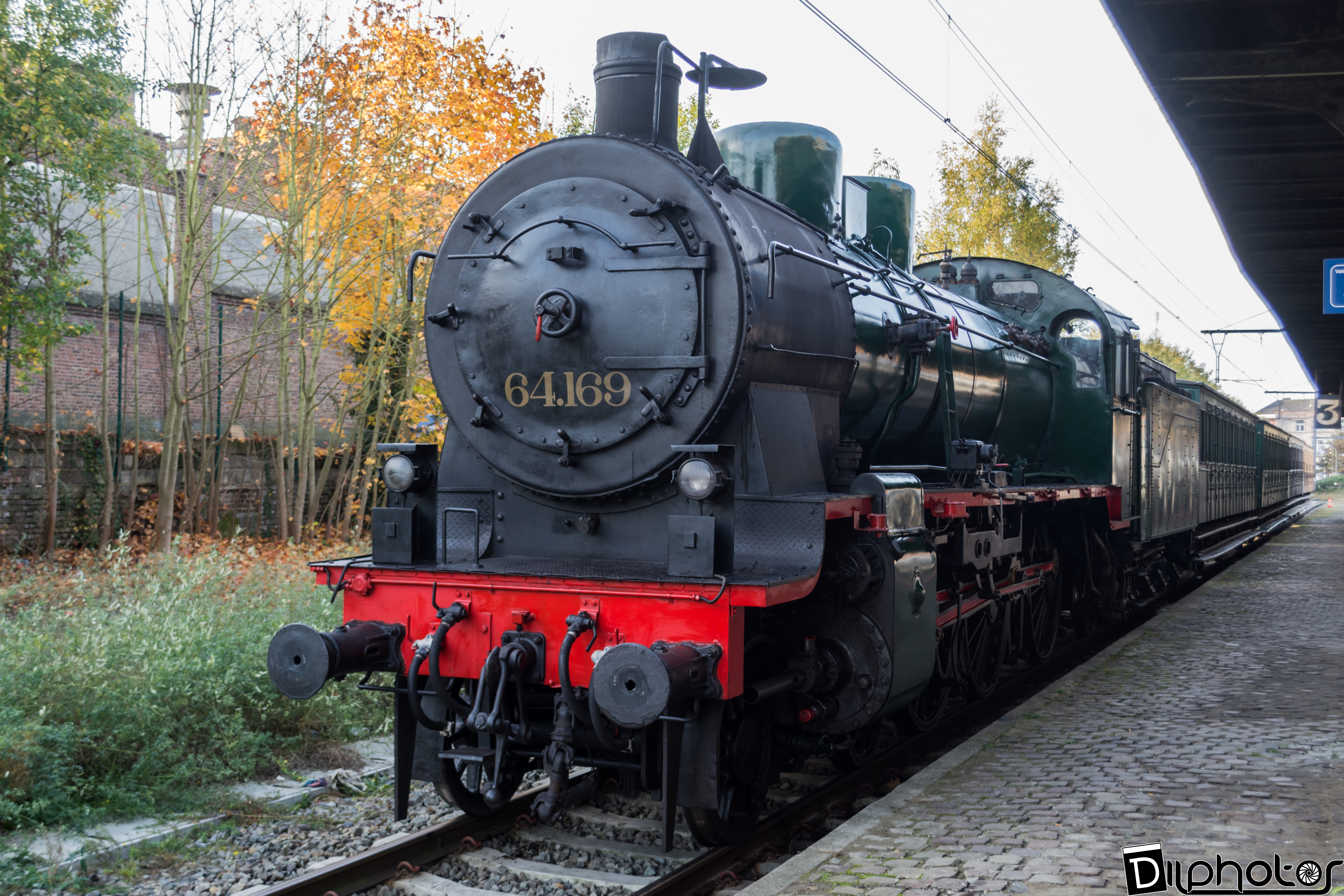
- NMBS/SNCB Type 64 64.169
Type and origin
- Power type: Steam
- Builder: L. Schwartzkopff, Hanomag, Henschel
- Build date: 1906-1923
- Total produced: 3956 as P 8, 168 delivered as Type 64
Specifications
- Configuration
  - Whyte: 2-6-0
- Gauge: 1,435 mm (4 ft 8 1/2 in) standard gauge
- Leading dia.: 1,000 mm (39.37 in)
- Driver dia.: 1,750 mm (68.90 in)
- Length: 11.15 m (36 ft 7 in)
- Loco weight: 75.28 t (74 long tons; 83 short tons)
- Fuel type: Coal
- Boiler pressure: 12 kg/cm^{2} (171 psi)
- Heating surface
  - Firebox: 14.35 m^{2} (154 sq ft)
  - Tubes: 135.01 m^{2} (1,453 sq ft)
  - Total surface: 149.36 m^{2} (1,608 sq ft)
- Superheater
  - Heating area: 58.9 m^{2} (634 sq ft)
- Cylinders: 2
- Cylinder size: 575 mm (22.64 in)x630 mm (24.80 in)
- Valve gear: Hausinger
Performance figures
- Maximum speed: 100 km/h (62 mph)
Career
- Operators: NMBS/SNCB
- Class: Type 64
- Number in class: 168
- Numbers: 64.001 – 64.168
- Delivered: SNCB 1919
- Withdrawn: 1967
- Preserved: 1, 64.045

The NMBS/SNCB Type 64 was a class of 4-6-0 steam locomotives built as Prussian P 8s for German railways, delivered as war reparations to Belgium at the end of World War I. 168 locomotives of this type were delivered to Belgium, working mostly on light passenger trains operated by the National Railway Company of Belgium (NMBS/SNCB). The final locomotives of this type were withdrawn in 1967, marking the end of steam service in the country.

== Design, construction and service history ==
As part of the Treaty of Versailles, Germany had to deliver over 2000 locomotives to Belgium as reparations. The first units arrived in Belgium in 1919, still wearing their German paint and copper plates identifying their region of use and a number. Painted verdigris for the body, black for the smoke box and the red for the chassis, wheels and decoration, these units would retain their German number identification plates until January 1925, keeping their German numbers until they were renumbered by the SNCB on October 1, 1931.

Originally built as Prussian P 8 locomotives, the Belgian Type 64 were capable of running up to speeds of 100 km/h.

Many of this type of locomotive were maintained at the Central workshop in Mechelen, which also performed services including complete tear-downs and boiler repairs.

Type 64 locomotives were seen in the Flemish TV series Wij, Heren van Zichem, during filming circa 1966.

== Preservation ==
Only one of the Type 64 was preserved by SNCB, the 64.045, which is not in working order.

Another locomotive, no. 64.169, has been preserved by Patrimoine Ferroviaire et Tourisme (PFT) in Belgium. Originally a CFR 230.084, it was found in a dilapidated state in Romania, sitting in Bacău for 20 years until it was purchased by the PFT on February 3, 2001 for a cost of $23 000. €130.000 was set aside for restoration of the locomotive, which was done by Cumeg in Cluj-Napoca. It returned to excursion service in Belgium in 2007.

== See also ==
- History of rail transport in Belgium
- List of SNCB/NMBS classes
- Rail transport in Belgium
