= SNCB Type 12 =

Class of steam locomotives

NMBS/SNCB Type 12
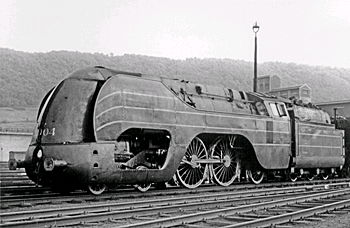
- 12.004 circa 1940
Type and origin
- Power type: Steam
- Designer: Raoul Notesse
- Builder: Société Anonyme John Cockerill
- Build date: 1938–1939
- Total produced: 6
Specifications
- Configuration
  - Whyte: 4-4-2
  - UIC: 2′B1′ h2
- Gauge: 1,435 mm (4 ft 8 1/2 in) standard gauge
- Leading dia.: 900 mm (35.43 in)
- Driver dia.: 2,100 mm (82.68 in)
- Trailing dia.: 1,262 mm (49.69 in)
- Loco weight: 89 tonnes (87.6 long tons; 98.1 short tons)
- Total weight: 116 tonnes (114.2 long tons; 127.9 short tons)
- Fuel type: Coal
- Fuel capacity: 8 tonnes (7.9 long tons; 8.8 short tons)
- Water cap.: 24,000 litres (5,300 imp gal; 6,300 US gal)
- Boiler pressure: 18 kg/cm^{2} (1.77 MPa; 256 psi)
- Cylinders: Two, inside
- Cylinder size: 480 mm × 720 mm (18.90 in × 28.35 in)
Performance figures
- Maximum speed: 140 km/h (87 mph) (service) 165 km/h (103 mph) (record)
- Power output: 2,500 hp (1,864 kW)
- Tractive effort: 118.52 kN (26,644 lbf)
Career
- Operators: SNCB/NMBS
- Class: Type 12
- Numbers: 1201 - 1206 12.001 – 12.006
- Withdrawn: July–September 1962
- Preserved: 12.004
- Restored: 1985
- Disposition: 1 preserved, 5 scrapped

The NMBS/SNCB Type 12 was a class of 4-4-2 steam locomotives built in 1938–1939 for the fast lightweight Ostend boat trains operated by the National Railway Company of Belgium.

== Design and construction ==
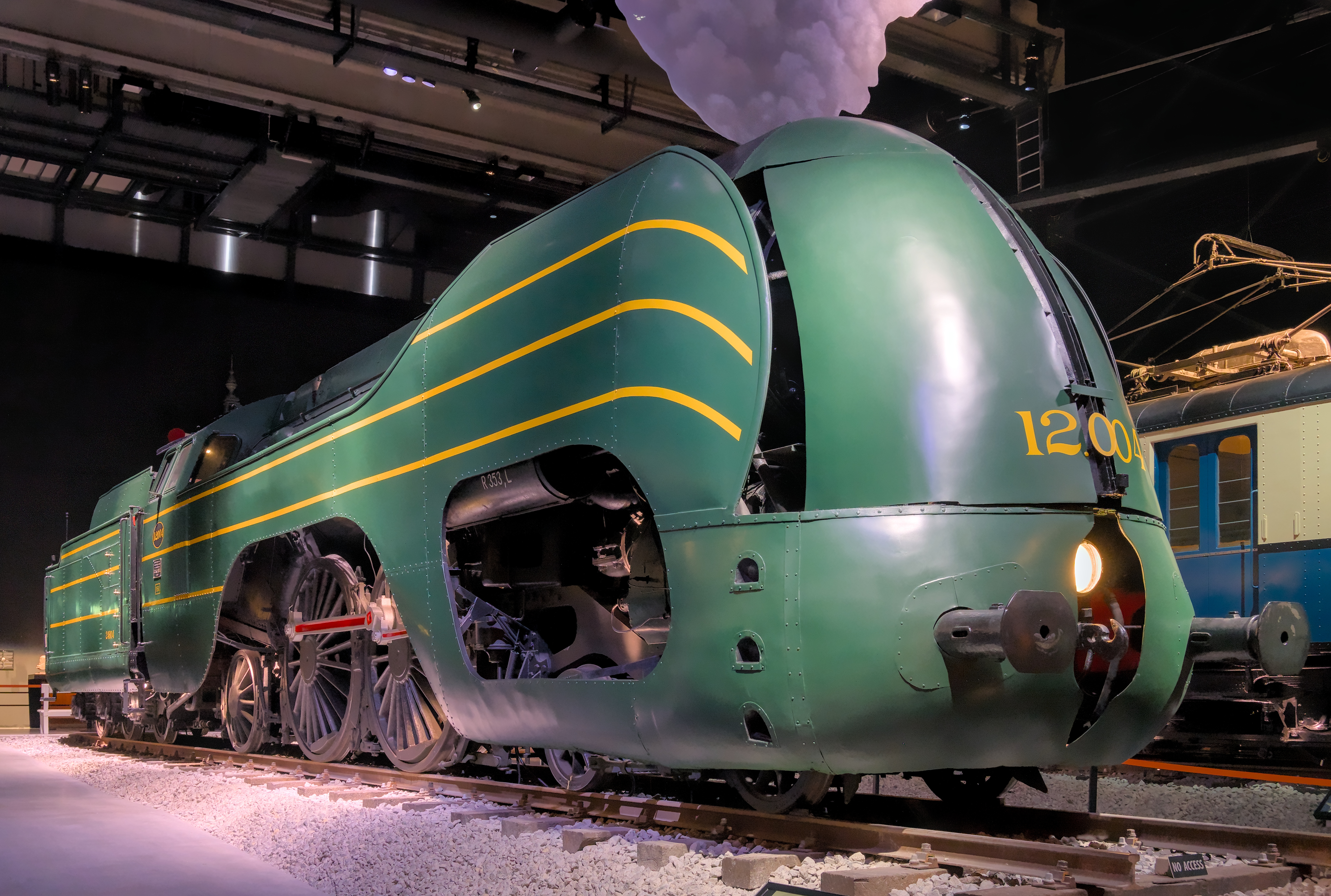
The preserved Type 12 locomotive exhibited in Train World, Brussels, with a mock steam effect

The class was designed by engineer Raoul Notesse, based on the Canadian Pacific Railway's successful 4-4-4 "Jubilee" semi-streamlined locomotives of 1936/7, but also incorporated the ideas on streamlining of André Huet.

The type 12 locomotives were produced for the Belgian Consortium of Locomotive Construction, by Société anonyme John Cockerill at Seraing, near Liège.

The locomotive bodies were fully streamlined except for openings to provide access to the valve gear and the crankshaft. The design included inside cylinders but outside valve gear to reduce oscillation at speed.

== Operation ==
The class was designed for the fast, relatively lightweight, boat trains on the 124 km (77 mi) journey between Brussels and Ostend to be capable of speeds of 120–140 km/h (75–87 mph). They were also used on Brussels–Liège expresses. During World War II they were used on Brussels–Ostend, Lontzen/Herbesthal, and Lille trains. For most of their careers, the type 12s were assigned to Schaerbeek, near Brussels.

The class was rated at a maximum speed of 140 km/h (87 mph). However, on 12 June 1939 one type 12 locomotive completed the 105 km (65 mi) from Brussels to Ostend in 57 minutes at a maximum speed of 165 km/h (103 mph).

The members of the class ended their careers on the Brussels–Mons and Brussels–Tournai services and were finally withdrawn 27 September 1962. No. 12.004 had been preserved by SNCB and was brought back to running order for the 150th anniversary of railways in Belgium in 1985 but was subsequently left exposed to the elements. Since September 2015 12.004 has been in the "Train World" railway museum at Schaerbeek, so this locomotive is back home.

== In fiction ==
François Schuiten, the Belgian comic book author, made No. 12.004 the central theme of his Graphic novel La Douce, published in 2012.

In Thomas & Friends: The Great Race, a Belgian character named Axel was based on this locomotive.

== See also ==
- History of rail transport in Belgium
- List of SNCB/NMBS classes
- Rail transport in Belgium
