= Belgian Railways Class 25.5 =

Class 25.5
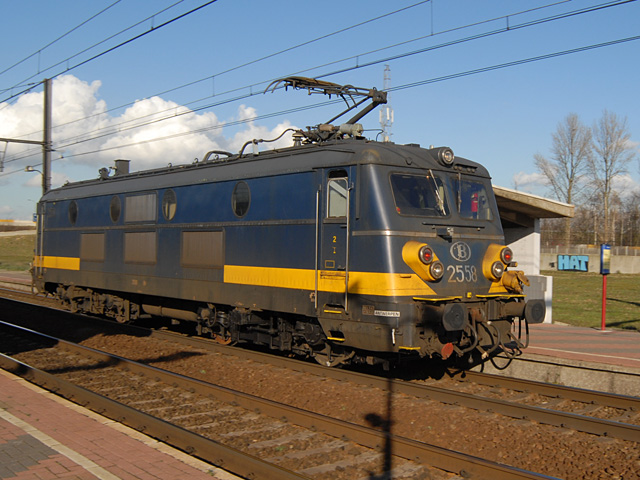
- NMBS/SNCB Class 25.5 loco 2558 at Antwerpen-Noorderdokken 8 March 2007.
Type and origin
- Power type: Electric
- Builder: BN/ACEC
- Build date: 1960-1961, modified 1973 - 1974
- Total produced: 8
Specifications
- Configuration
  - UIC: Bo′Bo′
- Gauge: 1,435 mm (4 ft 8 1/2 in) standard gauge
- Driver dia.: 1,262 mm (49.7 in)
- Length: 18 m (59 ft 1 in)
- Adhesive weight: 10.5 t (10.33 long tons; 11.57 short tons)
- Loco weight: 85 t (83.66 long tons; 93.70 short tons)
- Electric system/s: 1500 V DC, 3000 V DC
- Current pickup: Pantograph
Performance figures
- Maximum speed: 130 km/h (81 mph)
- Power output: 1,740 kW (2,330 hp) continuous, 1,880 kW (2,520 hp) one hour
- Tractive effort: 196 kN (44,000 lbf)
Career
- Operators: SNCB/NMBS
- Class: 25.5
- Number in class: 8
- Numbers: 2551-2558
- Delivered: 1960-1961
- Retired: 2009
- Disposition: 2551 preserved. Others scrapped

SNCB Class 25.5 locomotives were part of the 1950s generation of SNCB electric locomotives that included Series 122 (later 22), 123 (later 23), 125, (later 25) and 140 (later 25 and 25.5) built between 1953 and 1961. There were 50 Series 122, 83 Series 123, 16 Series 125 and 6 Series 140 for a total of 155 locomotives. They were seen across Belgium on passenger and freight trains until they were retired in 2012. There was no difference in power between the classes as they all used the same traction motors and control equipment.

Class 25 was intended as a passenger engine. The main differences to Class 23 were the cables on the roof and the provision of wheelslip detection plus an improved starting system. The Class 25 roof cabling was later applied to all Class 22 and 23 locos as they passed through the works. They were painted dark blue with a yellow band low on the body. Unlike the other 1950s locomotives, Class 25.5's nose and side numbers plus their SNCB logos were in chrome rather than being painted on.

The Class 25.5 was the first class on SNCB to be modified for push-pull operations followed by Class 25. In 1973 the last eight locomotives of Class 25, 2515–2522, received the dual voltage equipment from locomotives 2239-2250 and a third headlamp. They also had Dutch signalling and train protection fitted. Lastly, they were given push-pull equipment. This let them work into Holland hauling push-pull trains operating the Benelux intercity service between Brussels and Amsterdam. This sub-series was renumbered in order 2551-2558 and named Class 25.5. In 1986 they were replaced on the Benelux service by the newly built SNCB Class 11 and new coaches from the Dutch railway to include driving trailers. Class 25.5 continued in service pulling mostly freight trains in Belgium and Holland until their retirement in 2009.

2557 changed identities with 2504 following an accident in 1979. 2504 (ex-125.004) received the dual voltage equipment, third headlight and Dutch safety equipment from 2557 (ex-2521, ex 125.105, ex-140.005) to keep the number of dual voltage locos in passenger service the same.

2551 has been preserved by the PFT-TSP railway preservation group.
