= Belgian Railways Class 51 =

Class 51
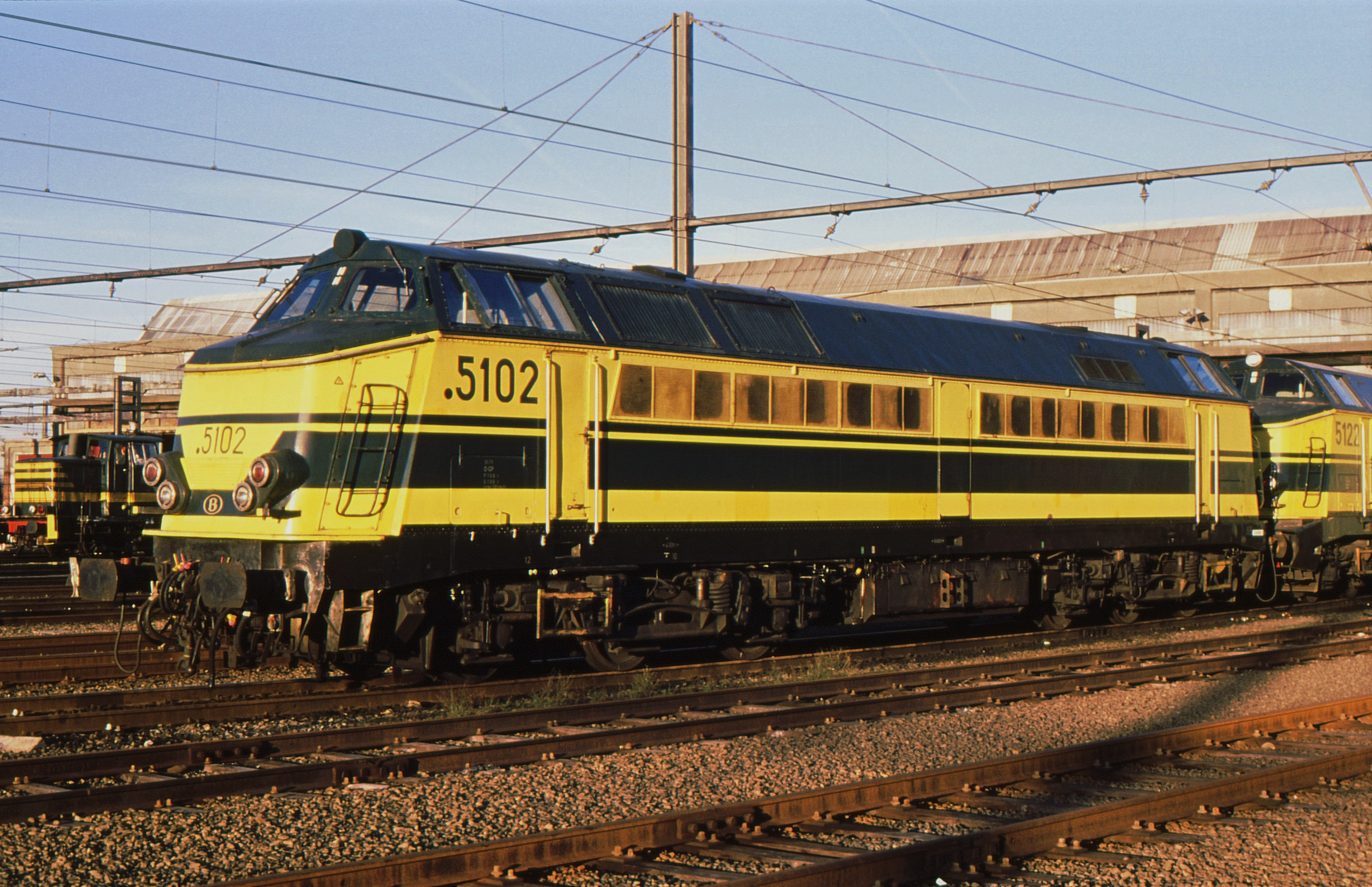
- Locomotive 5102 at Schaarbeek in 1998
Type and origin
- Power type: Diesel
- Builder: Cockerill
- Build date: 1961-1963
- Total produced: 93
Specifications
- Configuration
  - AAR: C-C
  - UIC: Co′Co′
- Gauge: 1,435 mm (4 ft 8 1/2 in) standard gauge
- Driver dia.: 1,010 mm (39.76 in)
- Length: 20.16 m (66 ft 2 in)
- Width: 2.90 m (9 ft 6 in)
- Height: 4.25 m (13 ft 11 in)
- Adhesive weight: 9.75 t (9.60 long tons; 10.75 short tons)
- Loco weight: 117 t (115.2 long tons; 129.0 short tons)
- Fuel type: Diesel
- Fuel capacity: 4,000L (1,056 US Gallon) 879 imp gallon
- Prime mover: Cockerill-Baldwin 608A
- Engine type: I8 Diesel Engine
- Cylinders: 8
- Transmission: Electric (ACEC)
- Loco brake: Air
- Train brakes: Air
Performance figures
- Maximum speed: 120 km/h (75 mph)
- Power output: 1,450 kW (1,940 hp)
- Tractive effort: 272 kN (61,000 lbf) Continuous 149 kN (33,000 lbf)
Career
- Operators: SNCB/NMBS
- Class: 51
- Number in class: 0 All withdrawn

The NMBS/SNCB Class 51 is a class of Co′Co′ diesel locomotive formerly used in Belgium.

== Disposition ==
No class 51s remain in service with NMBS/SNCB although a number have been preserved.

- 5117 PFT
- 5120 CFV3V
- 5128 PFT
- 5149 PFT
- 5166 SNCB, Schaarbeek Depot
- 5183 PFT

Some remained active abroad:

- 5175 Seen in Sicily July 2017
- 5132 Spotted in Sicily April 2018
