= Belgian Railways Class 55 =

Diesel locomotive

Class 55
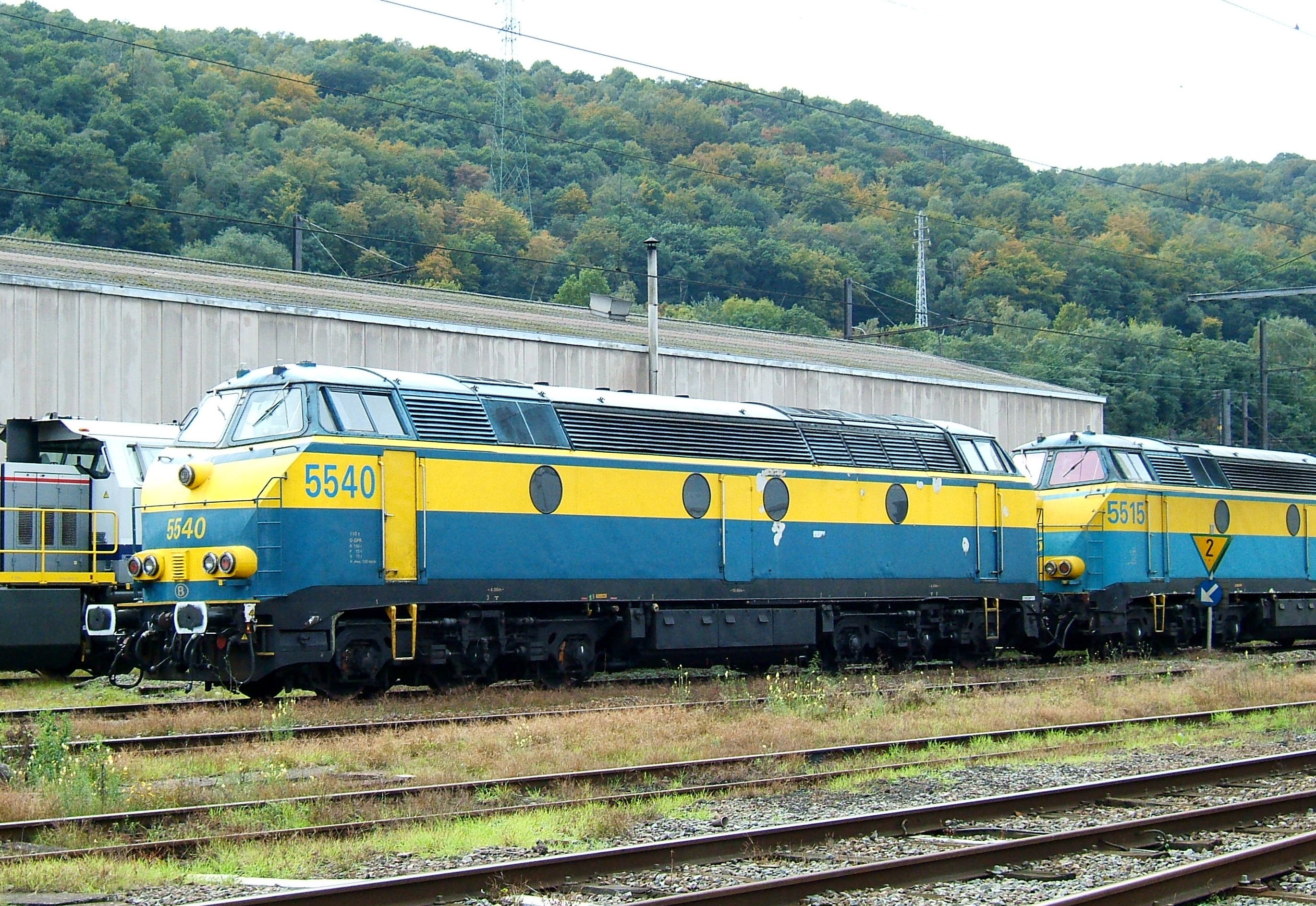
- NMBS/SNCB Class 55 locos 5540 & 5515 at Kinkempois depot, 21 October 2006.
Type and origin
- Power type: Diesel
- Builder: BN/ACEC/SEMG
- Build date: 1961-1962
- Total produced: 42
Specifications
- Configuration
  - UIC: Co′Co′
- Gauge: 1,435 mm (4 ft 8 1/2 in) standard gauge
- Driver dia.: 1,010 mm (39.76 in)
- Length: 19.55 m (64 ft 2 in)
- Width: 2.9 m
- Height: 4.25 m
- Adhesive weight: 9.2 t (9.1 long tons; 10.1 short tons)
- Loco weight: 110 t (108.3 long tons; 121.3 short tons)
- Fuel type: Diesel
- Fuel capacity: 4000L 879 imp gallon (1,056 US Gallon)
- Prime mover: GM 16-567C
- Engine type: Two-stroke 45° V-engine diesel
- Aspiration: Turbochargers
- Cylinders: 16
- Cylinder size: Bore x Stroke; 8.5 in (216 mm) x 10 in (254 mm)
- Transmission: Electric (ACEC)
- Loco brake: Air
- Train brakes: Air
Performance figures
- Maximum speed: 120 km/h (75 mph)
- Power output: 1,435 kW (1,924 hp)
- Tractive effort: 272 kN (61,000 lbf)
Career
- Operators: SNCB/NMBS
- Class: 55
- Number in class: 23
- Numbers: Various remain in range 5501-5542
- Disposition: In service

The SNCB Class 55 is a NMBS/SNCB diesel locomotive.

Six of these locomotives (5501, 5506, 5509, 5511, 5512 and 5514) are outfitted with TVM 430 signaling and a Scharfenberg coupler. This is for hauling broken-down or unpowered TGVs on line 1. They display a horizontal red band and the letters "TVM". Some locomotives are owned and used by the Société Nationale des Chemins de Fer Luxembourgeois as CFL Class 1800.
