= Belgian Railways Class 50 (diesel locomotive) =

High-powered testbed locomotive

Class 50
Type and origin
- Power type: Diesel
- Builder: Cockerill
- Build date: 1969 (rebuilt from 200.001/5101)
- Total produced: 1
Specifications
- Configuration
  - UIC: Co′Co′
- Gauge: 1,435 mm (4 ft 8 1/2 in)
- Length: 20.16 m (66 ft 2 in)
- Width: 2.91 m (9 ft 7 in)
- Height: 4.25 m (13 ft 11 in)
- Loco weight: 123.5 t
- Fuel type: Diesel
- Engine type: Cockerill-Baldwin 608A I8
Performance figures
- Maximum speed: 140 km/h (87 mph)
- Power output: 4000 hp ≈ 2940 kW
Career
- Operators: SNCB/NMBS
- Class: 50
- Number in class: 1
- Numbers: 5001
- Disposition: Reinstated to HLD 5101

The NMBS-SNCB HLD 50 locomotive was a high-powered testbed locomotive, converted from HLD 201.001 in 1969.

== History ==
NMBS-SNCB wanted to gain experiences with high-powered diesel locomotives, with a possible order following if the tests would prove successful. As locomotive 200.001 was due for a large revision it was decided to rebuild this locomotive with a 4000 hp Cockerill engine. It was planned to give the locomotive the number 200.101, but as the rebuilding took some 2 years and a half, much longer than expected, it was directly given the new number 5001, in line with the large renumbering in 1971.

Apart from the new 16-cylinder engine it was also equipped with electric train heating, which replaced the steam generator.

== Career ==
After the locomotive was converted it was first trialled and put in commercial service. During both trials and commercial service it proved to be very unreliable and was spending more time in workshops than it was running on the track.

In 1976 the trials were stopped as NMBS-SNCB decided that it didn't need a high-power diesel locomotive anymore. Upon this decision it was first stabled at Kinkempois workshops and later at the shed in Latour.

After some time the locomotive was sent to the Salzinnes workshops to be converted back into a standard class 51 locomotive. It received the engine of HLD 5176 which was damaged in an accident, but whose engine was still intact. In 1980 it was back put into service as a standard class 51 locomotive under number 5101.
