= DRG Class 25 =

Class 25 may refer to:

- Express train, steam locomotives with a 2-8-0 wheel arrangement operated by the Deutsche Reichsbahn in the GDR after World War II:
  - The new, post-war locomotive (Neubaulokomotive): DR Class 25.0
  - The trials locomotives: DR Class 25.10
- The electric multiple units of DRG Class ET 25, later DB Class 425, built for the Deutsche Reichsbahn in the 1930s.
