= Mail train =

Many countries have had dedicated railway services for the delivery of postal mail.

Examples include:

- In Australia, the Travelling post office, Queensland
- In Austria, the Bahnpost (Austria) (1850–2004)
- In France, the SNCF TGV La Poste (1984–2015) were rail cars built specifically for La Poste, which had run rail services since 1846
- In Germany, as well as the Bahnpost (Germany) (from 1840s), several cities have their own mail trains, including:
  - Poststraßenbahn Berlin in Berlin
  - Post-U-Bahn München in Munich
- In Switzerland, the Bahnpost (Switzerland) has run since 1847
- In the United Kingdom, the Travelling Post Office (1830–2004) was a service where post was sorted en route
  - The London Post Office Railway (1927–2003) operated in dedicated tunnels under London
- In the United States, the Railway Mail Service (1862–1978) of the United States Postal Service carried the vast majority of mail from the 1890s until the 1960s
  - The Railway Mail Service used railway post offices within passenger services to sort post en route
  - The use of the Chicago Tunnel Company for mail freight inspired the London Post Office Railway
