= Belgian Railways Class 25 =

Class 25
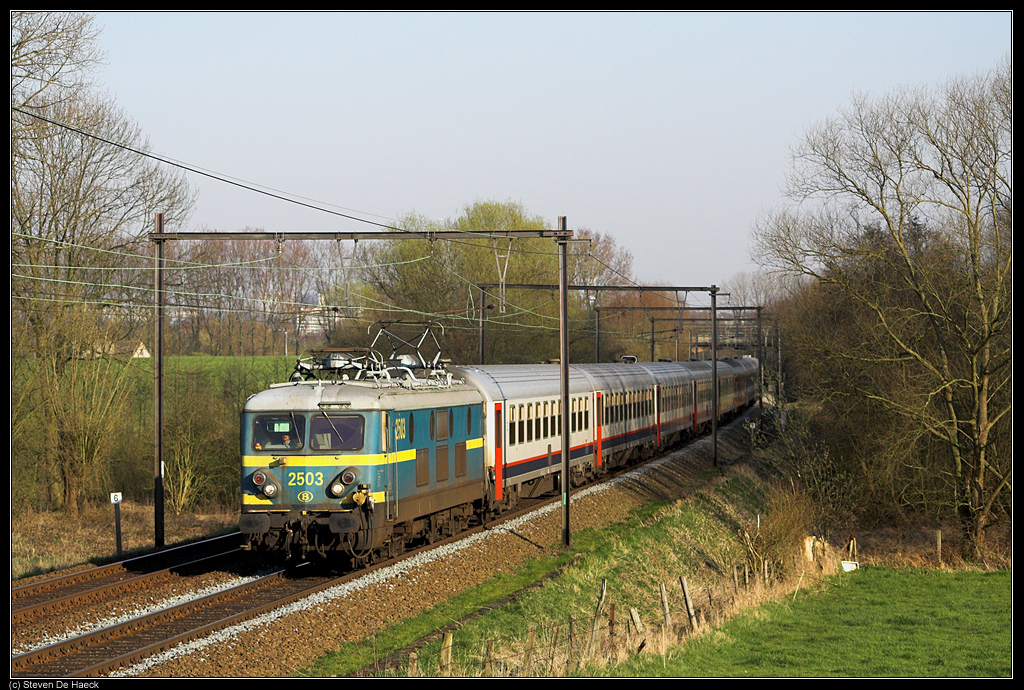
- NMBS-SNCB HLE 2503 at Sint-Anna-Pede.
Type and origin
- Power type: Electric
- Builder: BN/ACEC
- Build date: 1960-1961
- Total produced: 22
Specifications
- Configuration
  - UIC: Bo′Bo′
- Gauge: 1,435 mm (4 ft 8 1/2 in) standard gauge
- Driver dia.: 1,262 mm (49.7 in)
- Length: 18 m (59 ft 1 in)
- Adhesive weight: 10.5 t (10.33 long tons; 11.57 short tons)
- Loco weight: 84 t (82.67 long tons; 92.59 short tons)
- Electric system/s: 3000 V DC
- Current pickup: Pantograph
Performance figures
- Maximum speed: 130 km/h (81 mph)
- Power output: 1,740 kW (2,333 hp) continuous 1,880 kW (2,521 hp) one hour
- Tractive effort: 196 kN (44,000 lbf)
Career
- Operators: SNCB/NMBS
- Class: 25
- Number in class: 22
- Numbers: 2501-2522
- Delivered: 1960-1961
- Disposition: 2551 (ex-2515, ex-125.015) preserved, all others withdrawn and scrapped.

Class 25 locomotives were part of the 1950s generation of SNCB electric locomotives that included Types 122 (later 22), 123 (later 23), 125, (later 25 and 25.5) and 140 (later 25 and 25.5) built between 1953 and 1961. There were 50 Series 122, 83 Series 123, 16 Series 125 and 6 Series 140 for a total of 155 locomotives. They were seen across Belgium on passenger and freight trains until they were retired in 2012. Class 23 was later fitted for multiple working, and were often found in pairs. There was no difference in power between the classes as they all used the same traction motors and control equipment.

Class 25 was intended as a passenger engine. The main differences to Class 23 were the cables on the roof and the provision of wheelslip detection plus an improved starting system. The Class 25 roof cabling was later applied to all Class 22 and 23 locos as they passed through the works.

These locomotives were the final development of the Type 122. They were originally called Type 125 and numbered 125.001 to 125.016. A second run of six locos produced Type 140, numbered 140.001-140.006 because their top speed was re-geared to 140 km/h (87 mph). This did not work out too well as the locos lost tractive effort and did not accelerate as fast as the normal Series 125 version. They were returned to standard with Class 125 by 1968 and numbered 125.101-125.106 1n 1971 all were renumbered into Series 25 with the numbers 2501–2522. In 1973 the last eight of them, 2515–2522, received the dual voltage equipment from 2239 to 2250, a third headlamp and Dutch safety equipment. This let them work into The Netherlands hauling international passenger trains. This sub-series was renumbered 2551-2558 (Class 25.5) and painted dark blue with yellow bands. They continued in service pulling mostly freight trains all over the system and into The Netherlands until their retirement in 2009.

The Class 25.5 was the first class on SNCB to be modified for push-pull operations followed by Class 25. Class 25.5 locomotives were assigned to the Benelux limited stop service between Brussels and Amsterdam hauling I4 coaches. There were two terminal stations on the line, Antwerp Central and Amsterdam Central. Push pull was required to avoid the delays from having the locomotives run around the trains or another locomotive added at the other end. This idea was later applied to the Class 25 fleet so they could easily work peak hour trains on the electrified part of the network. A number of M2BD coaches were transformed into driving trailers for this purpose. Later on more M2BDs were transformed into driving trailers for Class 62/63 diesel locos. The M2BDs that worked with Class 25 had a pointed (seen from the side) cab end while the version for Class 62 was nearly completely flat. The reason for the difference was that each group of M2BD was made to function with only one loco type thus an M2BD for Class 25 would not be functional with a Class 62 and vice versa.

2557 changed identities with 2504 following an accident in 1979. 2504 (ex 125.004) received the dual voltage equipment, third headlight and Dutch safety equipment from 2557 (ex-2521, ex 125.105, ex-140.005) to keep the number of dual voltage locos available for passenger service the same.

2551 has been preserved by the PFT-TSP railway preservation group.
