= Rail transport in Belgium =

Belgium
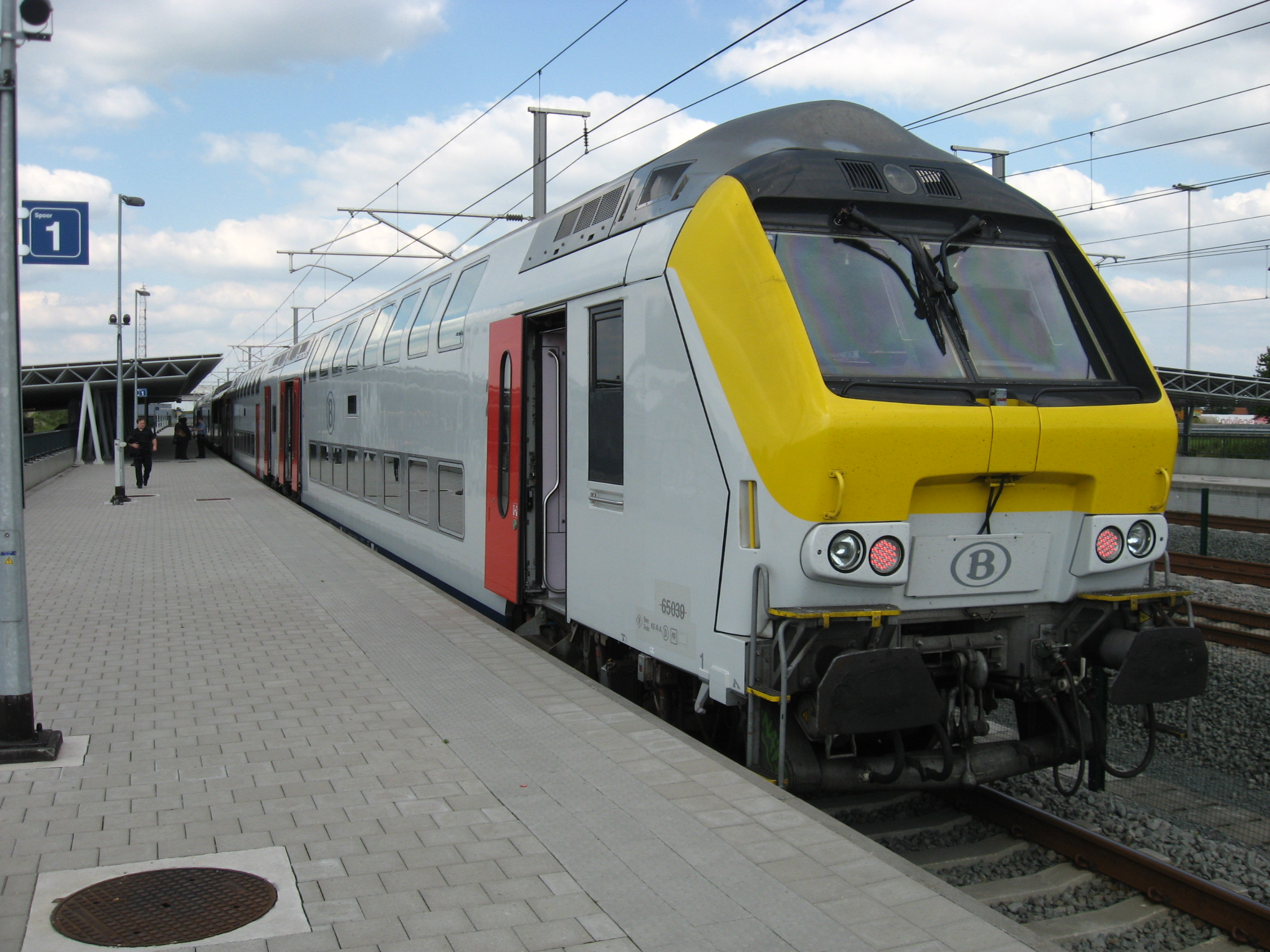
- IR train in Noorderkempen Station

Operation
- National railway: NMBS/SNCB
- Infrastructure company: Infrabel
- Major operators: Eurostar, SNCF, DB (passengers), Lineas, BLS Cargo Nord, DB Cargo Belgium, SNCF Fret (freight)

Statistics
- Ridership: 244.6 million per year (2023)
- Passenger-distance: 10.441 billion per year (2023)
- Freight: 53.5 million tonnes per year (2023)

System length
- Total: 3,733 kilometres (2,320 mi) (2022)
- Double track: 2,934 kilometres (1,823 mi) (2023)
- Electrified: 3,286 kilometres (2,042 mi) (2022)

Track gauge
- Main: 1,435 mm (4 ft 8 1/2 in)
- High-speed: 1,435 mm (4 ft 8 1/2 in)

Electrification
- 3000 V DC: Main network
- 25 kV AC: High-speed lines and recent electrification

Features
- No. of stations: 555 (2023)
Map

Rail transport in Belgium benefits from an extensive rail network. The country is a member of the International Union of Railways (UIC). The UIC Country Code for Belgium is 88.

== History ==
On May 5, 1835, the first railway in continental Europe opened between Brussels-Groendreef/Allée verte and Mechelen. Some sort of railroad or canal had been envisaged as early as 1830. The feasibility of a railroad was investigated by engineers Pierre Simons and Gustave De Ridder. The first trains were Stephenson engines imported from Great Britain. The engines were called Pijl meaning Arrow, Olifant meaning Elephant, and 'Stephenson' (named after its designer). They pulled bench-cars and diligences. On the return from Mechelen, the Olifant pulled all 30 cars. By 1840, Ghent, Bruges, Ostend, Antwerp, Mechelen, Brussels and Leuven were connected. The lines that had to reach Liège, Mons and Kortrijk were partially completed. In 1843, when the major East-West/North-South axes were complete, private companies were allowed to construct and use their own rail systems. These were crucial in the industrialisation of the country.

In 1870, the Belgian state owned 863 kilometres (536 mi) of rail lines, while the private enterprises owned 2,231 kilometres (1,386 mi). From 1870 to 1882, the railways were gradually nationalised. In 1912, 5,000 kilometres (3,100 mi) were state property compared to 300 kilometres (190 mi) private lines. Full nationalisation was considered at the time but was not enacted until 1926, when the SNCB was started. It was named the SNCB (Société nationale des Chemins de Fer belges) or NMBS (Nationale Maatschappij der Belgische Spoorwegen), named in a similar way to the French rail network, SNCF, which was founded 12 years later. In 1958 the network was fully state-owned. On 5 May 1935 the SNCB started with electrification on the line Brussels North to Antwerp Central, 44 kilometres (27 mi).

== Infrastructure ==
In 2003, the network constituted 3,518 kilometres (2,186 mi) of railways, all of which were standard gauge: 1,435 mm (4 ft 8 1/2 in). Of all of those railways, 2,631 kilometres (1,635 mi) were also electrified. Most electrified Belgian lines use a 3 kV DC overhead power supply, but the high speed-lines are electrified at 25 kV AC, as are recent electrifications in the south of the country (Rivage - Gouvy and Dinant - Athus lines).

Trains in Belgium normally run on the left hand track. This is in contrast to road vehicles, which drive on the right hand side of the road and is evidence of the British involvement in building the rail network in the 19th century.

The railway network is controlled and maintained by Infrabel.

== Policy ==
Belgium operates a policy of cheap rail travel. Citizens in Belgium, especially students and older citizens, are offered incentives and cheaper fares in order to alleviate congestion on the nation's roads. Public sector employees are entitled to a free or heavily subsidised season ticket for commuting by rail. Many private sector employers will make a contribution to the cost of a season ticket. Smoking is prohibited in all railway stations, and all tracks since January 2023 (enclosed and outside too), and passenger cars.

== Rail links with adjacent countries ==
All adjacent countries use the same 1,435 mm (4 ft 8 1/2 in) standard gauge.

- Netherlands - different voltage 3 kV DC/1500 V DC. The change of voltage occurs south of Roosendaal, and between the Dutch stations of Eijsden and Maastricht Randwijck; monovoltage 3 kV Belgian trains proceed under reduced power to the first large station past the border (Roosendaal or Maastricht). Border crossings are at:
  - Essen, Visé (Wezet)
  - Meer (high speed line, 25 kV 50 Hz)
  - Hamont, Lanaken and Zelzate (all three: not electrified, freight only; line 20 Lanaken – Maastricht is "temporarily out of service" from Lanaken to the border, and not connected to the rest of the Belgian net.)
  - Eisden (planned, opening scheduled between 2012 and 2017)
  - Achel (closed, reopening scheduled between 2012 and 2017)
  - Sint-Gillis-Waas (closed), Turnhout (closed)
- Germany - different voltage 3 kV DC/15 kV AC. The change of voltage occurs in Aachen station where there is a switchable track so that 3 kV monovoltage trains can reach Aachen. Change of voltage also on the Moresnet viaduct on the freight only line Visé - Montzen - Aachen West. Border crossings are at:
  - Welkenraedt
  - Kelmis-Hergenrath (includes high speed traffic on the upgraded line)
  - Losheimergraben (dismounted), Raeren (dismounted), Gemmenich (freight only, voltage change between goods stations Montzen(B) and Gemmenich(D), several kilometers inside the Belgian side of the border).
  - Steinebrück (closed),
- Luxembourg - different voltage 3 kV DC/25 kV AC. All Belgian lines going to the grand-duchy of Luxembourg use 25 kV 50 Hz long before the border so there is no voltage change. Border crossings are at:
  - Arlon - Sterpenich(B) – Kleinbettingen(L)
  - Gouvy(B) – Troisvierges(L)
  - Athus(B) or Aubange(B) - Rodange(L)
  - Lengeler, Benonchamps, Lommersweiler (all closed)
- France - different voltage 3 kV DC/25 kV AC. The change of voltage occurs at the border, except for the high-speed line which is 25 kV throughout and as mentioned below. Border crossings are at:
  - Mouscron(B) (Moeskroen) – Tourcoing(F)
  - Tournai(B) – Froyennes(B) – Blandain(F) (voltage change long before the border, at the switch "Y Froyennes" from line 75A Tournai – Mouscron)
  - Quiévrain (dismounted)
  - Quévy(B) – Feignies(F)
  - Erquelinnes(B) – Jeumont(F)
  - Aubange(B) – Mont-Saint-Martin(F) (Belgian line is on 50 kV AC long before the border, no voltage change)
  - high speed line at Esplechin
  - Adinkerke to Dunkirk track in situ, line closed to passengers and freight
  - Momignies the track has been taken off in favor of a cycle track
  - Heer-Agimont (line from Dinant to Givet): track in situ, line closed to passengers and freight. Part of the line from Dinant used to be the site of a tourists' steam train, but no more in exploitation.
  - Menen, Comines-Warneton, Leupegem, Antoing, Péruwelz, Dour, Doische (closed)
- United Kingdom - using HSL 1, LGV Nord, the Channel Tunnel and the High Speed 1/Channel Tunnel Rail Link is 25 kV AC. All rail transport between Belgium and the UK transits through France.

== See also ==
- List of Belgian railway services
- List of railway lines in Belgium
- List of railway stations in Belgium
- National Railway Company of Belgium
- List of SNCB/NMBS classes
- Rail transport by country
- Train World
- Transport in Belgium
- Vicinal tramway
