= Ateliers de Constructions Electriques de Charleroi =

Belgian electrical engineering company

ACEC
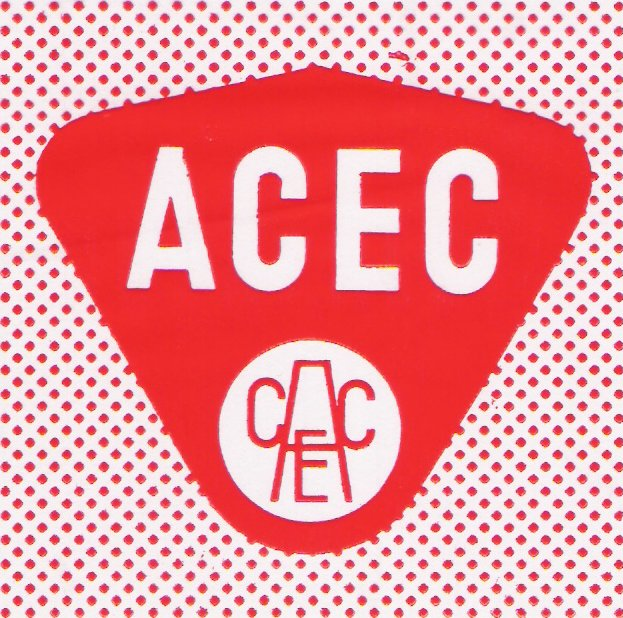
- ACEC logo, post 1956
- Industry: Electrical engineering
- Predecessor: Compagnie générale d'Electricité (Charleroi, 1881–1886); Société anonyme Électricité et Hydraulique à Charleroi (1886–1904)
- Founded: 1904
- Defunct: 1989
- Fate: split and sold
- Headquarters: Charleroi

SA Ateliers de Constructions Electriques de Charleroi (ACEC) was a Belgian manufacturer of electrical generation, transmission, transport, lighting and industrial equipment, with origins dating to the late 19th century as a successor to the Société Électricité et Hydraulique founded by Julien Dulait.

After World War II the company expanded into electronics, and became a contractor to the nuclear industry. The company was acquired by Westinghouse in 1970; in 1985 Westinghouse's share was acquired by Société Générale de Belgique (SGB) and Compagnie Générale d'Electricité (CGE).

The company operated at a loss during the 1980s, and was split and sold; Alstom and its affiliates acquired the majority of the company, along with ABB and Alcatel Bell and others. The remnants of the company were merged into Union Minière in 1989, forming ACEC Union Minière.

== History ==
=== Background, 1878–1904 ===
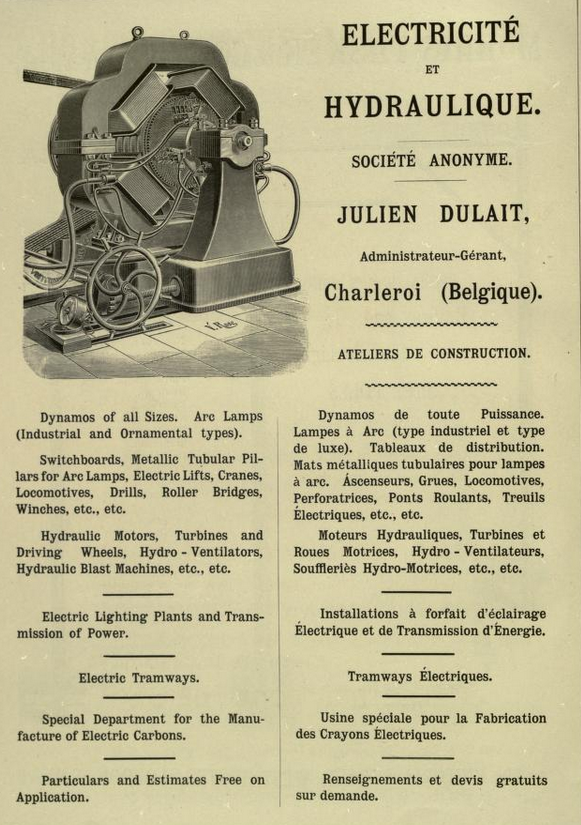
Électricité et Hydraulique advert (1897)

In 1878 Julien Dulait (1855–1926), son of steelworks engineer Jules Dulait began experiments into electrical and hydraulic machines; with co-worker Désiré Barras he created an electricity generating machine powered by an hydroelectric turbine. In 1881 the Compagnie générale d'Electricité was formed in Charleroi with Dulait as consulting engineer, constructing machines to Dulait's designs and those of Zénobe Gramme.

In 1886 the company was renamed becoming Société anonyme Électricité et Hydraulique à Charleroi (E&H), by this time the factory was producing dynamos with over 100 kW power. By 1900 the company had supplied electric lighting to the cities of Liege, Charleroi and Schaerbeek, and opened a new 50 ha (0.50 km^{2}) factory in Marcinelle/Marchienne. In 1904 the company supplied trams for a line in Cointe, Liege- – the first entirely Belgian built trams.

The company's product range included dynamos, lifts, carbon arc lamps, electric traction motors for trams and drilling equipment.

In 1898, the company established a factory in France in Jeumont (France/Belgium border).

On 7 July 1904, the company became Ateliers de Constructions électriques de Charleroi (ACEC), having been acquired by Baron Edouard Empain; Empain made an entry into the electrical industry in an attempt to counter German companies' share of the Belgian market.

The Jeumont, France factory was renamed Ateliers de constructions électriques du Nord et de l'Est (ACENE) in 1906; much later (1960s) becoming part of Jeumont Schneider.

=== ACEC, 1904–1970 ===
After its foundation in 1904 the company expanded in the next decade, establishing several new factories including ones for electrical cables, machine and tool making, and large machines. In 1914 the company began manufacturing motor vehicles, with an electric transmission system, to the design of Balachowsky & Caire. During World War I the factory was stripped of machines by occupying German forces.

Between the wars, ACEC began to produce vacuum-based electronics, including mercury arc rectifiers, which replaced rotary converters on Brussels trams in 1929. The company also produced a high-power test installations, capable of producing 2.5GW in short circuit, with currents and voltages of up to 267kA and 250kV.

In 1939 ACEC began to collaborate with Constructions Electriques de Belgique (CEB), with the two companies rationalising their combined production.

During the build-up to World War II the factory was commissioned to manufacture 75mm anti-aircraft guns, 47mm anti-tank guns and other weapons, as well as variable-pitch propellers and parts for Hispano-Suiza aircraft. After the outbreak of war preparations were made to relocate the factories, and some production was restarted at a Hispano-Suiza factory near Tarbes, France. The Charleroi plant was initially taken under the control of the German armed forces. By 1942 raw materials, manufactured parts and tools were beginning to become scarce, and workers at the plant began to be commandeered to work in factories in Germany, mainly those of AEG, Siemens and Brown-Boveri.

In 1947 the collaboration with CEB concluded with the two companies merging, forming ACEC Herstal.

ACEC also acted as a contractor and equipment supplier to the nuclear industry, supplying sensor and handling systems including fuel rod handling, pumps for coolant systems and instrumentation, as well as conventional power plant equipment such as main generators, pumps, control systems, instrumentation and computer systems. In 1957, the company entered into a licensing arrangement with Westinghouse relating to PWR reactors.

In the three decades after World War II the company also expanded into the electronics industry, starting to manufacture products including tape recorders, televisions, and radios.

The Société Electro Meccanique (SEM) (Ghent) was absorbed in 1960/1.

In 1970, it became a member of the Westinghouse group. Over the next two decades the company was restructured and its various operations sold off, much of the company being acquired by Compagnie Générale d'Electricité (CGE).

=== ACEC breakup, 1970–1989 ===
The ACEC cable factory was split as a separate company câblerie de Charleroi in 1971, and acquired by Compagnie Générale d'Electricité (CGE) in 1986, as of 2012 a factory in Charleroi is part of Nexans Benelux (Nexans group) and manufacturers medium and high voltage electric (up to 500kV) cable.

Westinghouse reduced its shareholding to less than 50% by the late 1970s,

In 1985, Inductotherm Industries acquired four induction heating businesses from ACEC, including Elphiac (Herstal, Belgium, joint company with Philips).

The Société Générale de Belgique (SGB) and Compagnie Générale d'Electricité (CGE) agreed to acquire Westinghouse's (42%) share in the company in 1985, becoming joint majority shareholders.

The company restructured in the 1980s, reducing its workforce from over 5000 in 1985 to 2200 in 1998. The company reported losses of over 4 billion Belgian francs (BF) in 1986, and over 500million loss in 1987. In 1988 the company was still in very poor financial condition; in the first half of 1988 it lost 570million BF on revenues of nearly 4billion Belgian francs. The main shareholders of ACEC's owner SGB (Suez group and Carlo De Benedetti) announced that the company was to be sold.

Many of the company's divisions were acquired by CGE subsidiaries (Alstom, Alcatel). Rail vehicle traction equipment manufacturer Kiepe Elektrik (acquired 1973) was sold to Alstom in 1988. The automation and energy divisions became majority owned by CGEE Alsthom (CGE subsidiary) as ACEC Automatisme SA, and ACEC Energie SA. The rail transport equipment subsidiary became a 100% owned subsidiary of Alsthom as ACEC Transport SA. in 1989; a plant in Herstal was closed, and traction motor manufacture ceased at Charleroi, moving to one of Alstom's French sites.

ABB acquired ACEC's mechanical engineering facilities in Ghent in 1988, effective April 1989, forming ACEC Turbo Power Systems SA (ATPS). The steel construction business "ACEC construction soudée" was sold to Cassart (Fernelmont, Belgium).

ACEC-SDT (space, defence, telecommunications) was merged into Alcatel-Bell (CGE majority owner, via Alcatel NV) forming Acatel-Bell-SDT.

By June 1989, the SGB was the only remaining shareholder of ACEC, trading of shares was suspended on 5 July 1989, in July 1989 the remnants of the company, considered essentially valueless, with estimated liabilities of over 7billion BF were merged into the company Union Minière, forming Acec-Union Minière. The merger, where ACEC absorbed UM, allowed to compensate the tax on UM's profits by carrying forward ACEC's losses.

=== ACEC Union Minière, 1989–1992 ===
The information technology company ACEC-OSI was absorbed into Tractebel subsidiary Trasys (Belgium) in 1989.

The pump machinery division was (ACEC centrifugal pumps) acquired (from ACEC Union Minière) by BW/IP in 1992. BW/IP successor Flowserve closed the Charleroi pump factory in 1997.

After the sale of the centrifugal pumps division, no significant parts of ACEC remained in the Union Minière; it was renamed Umicore in 1992.

== See also ==
- Manx Electric Railway rolling stock, retains original power cars from the late 1890s with E&H traction motors.
- Tihange Nuclear Power Station and Doel Nuclear Power Station, Belgian nuclear powerplants; all (Doel 1–4, and Tihange 1–3) had equipment supplied by ACEC in consortia with other companies.
- Tripartite-class minehunter, and Belgian ship Godetia; built with ACEC equipment – in particular electric manoeuvring propellers.
- ACEC Cobra, ACEC developed armoured vehicle (1977) with electric transmission.
