= Class 22 =

Class 22 may refer to:

- Belgian Railways Class 22, a class of Bo-Bo electric locomotives in service 1959-2009
- British Rail Class 22 1st use, a class of Bo-Bo diesel-hydraulic locomotives in service in the United Kingdom 1962-72
- Dongbo 22-class barge
- British Rail Class 22 2nd use, a class of B-B electric locomotives in service in Belgium, France and the United Kingdom 1994-95
- DR Class 22, a class of 2-8-2 steam locomotives in service in East Germany 1958-71
- GER Class E22, 0-6-0T steam locomotives
- KTM Class 22, a class of Co-Co diesel electric locomotives in service in Malaya 1971-2010
- NCC Class 22, a diesel mechanical locomotive in service in Northern Ireland 1944-65
- NSB Class 22, a class of 2-8-0 steam locomotives in service in Norway 1906-58
- PKP class ET22, a class of Co-Co electric locomotives in service in Poland since 1971
- PKP class Ok22, a class of 4-6-0 steam locomotives in service in Poland 1923-39
- South African Class 22E, a class of Co-Co electric locomotives in service in South Africa since 2015

== See also ==
- Type 22 (disambiguation)
