= HSL 2 =

Belgian high-speed rail line

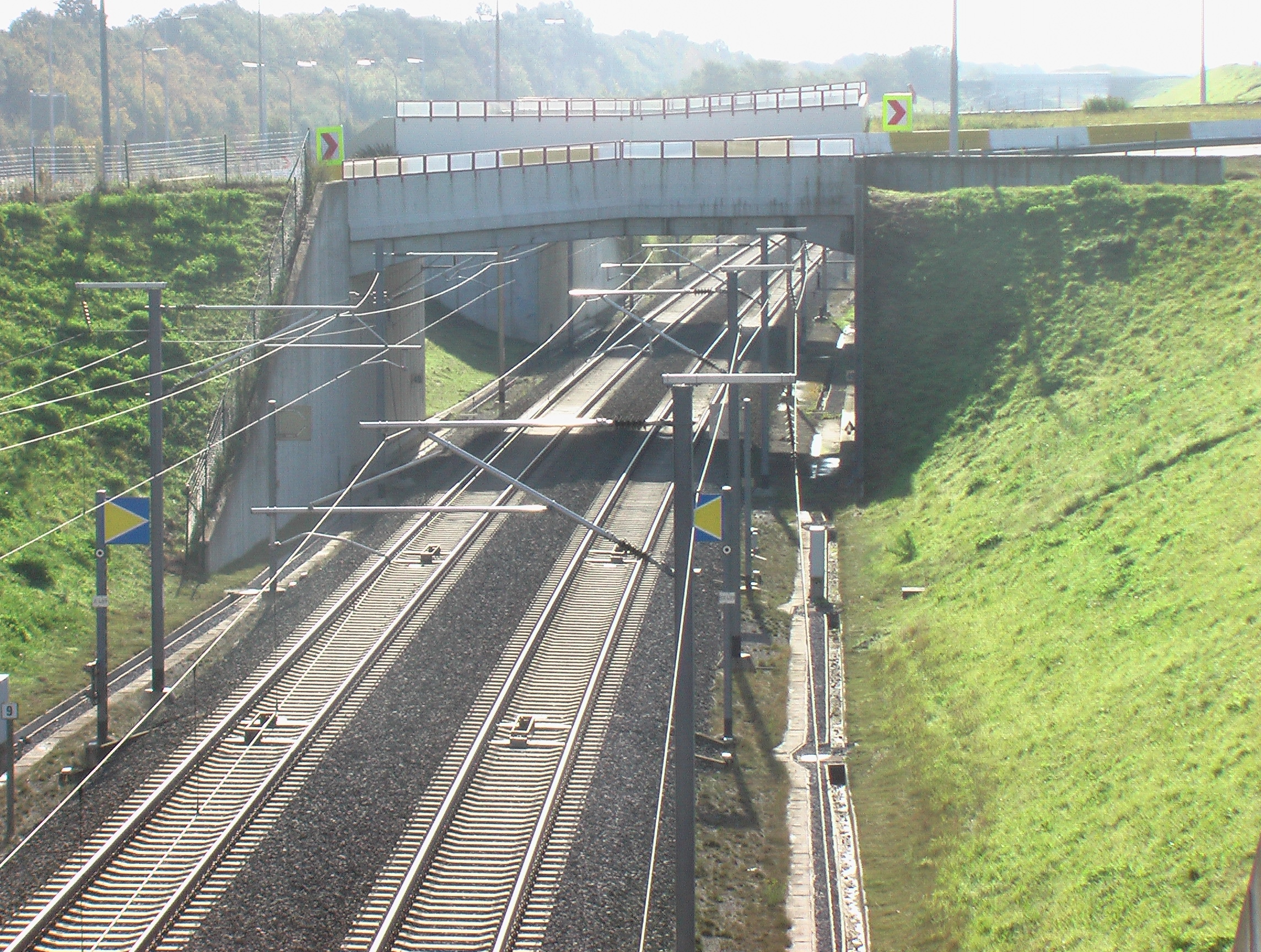
- HSL 2 near Hoegaarden alongside A3/E40

Overview
- Status: In operation
- Owner: Infrabel
- Locale: Belgium
- Termini: Leuven; Ans
- Stations: 0

Service
- Type: High Speed Rail; Heavy rail
- System: Belgian HSL
- Operator(s): Thalys, ICE, SNCB/NMBS
- Depot(s): Forest, (Leuven, Ans)
- Rolling stock: Thalys PBKA, ICE 3M, SNCB Class 18 or Class 13 + I11 or I6 or I10

History
- Opened: 15 December 2002

Technical
- Line length: 66 km (41 mi)
- Number of tracks: 2
- Track gauge: 1,435 mm (4 ft 8 1/2 in) standard gauge
- Electrification: 25 kV, 50 Hz AC
- Operating speed: 300 km/h (186 mph)

The HSL 2 (Dutch: Hogesnelheidslijn 2, English: High-Speed Line 2) is a Belgian high-speed rail line between Leuven and Ans (near Liège) and is 66.2 km (41 mi) long, all of it on dedicated high-speed tracks, which began service on 15 December 2002. As part of the Belgian railway network, it is owned, technically operated and maintained by Infrabel.

Since the extension to the German border was completed (the HSL 3), the fastest journey time between Brussels South and Cologne Central Station is 1 hour and 47 minutes. HSL 2 is used by Eurostar (previously Thalys) and ICE trains as well as fast internal Belgian Railways InterCity services.

== Route ==
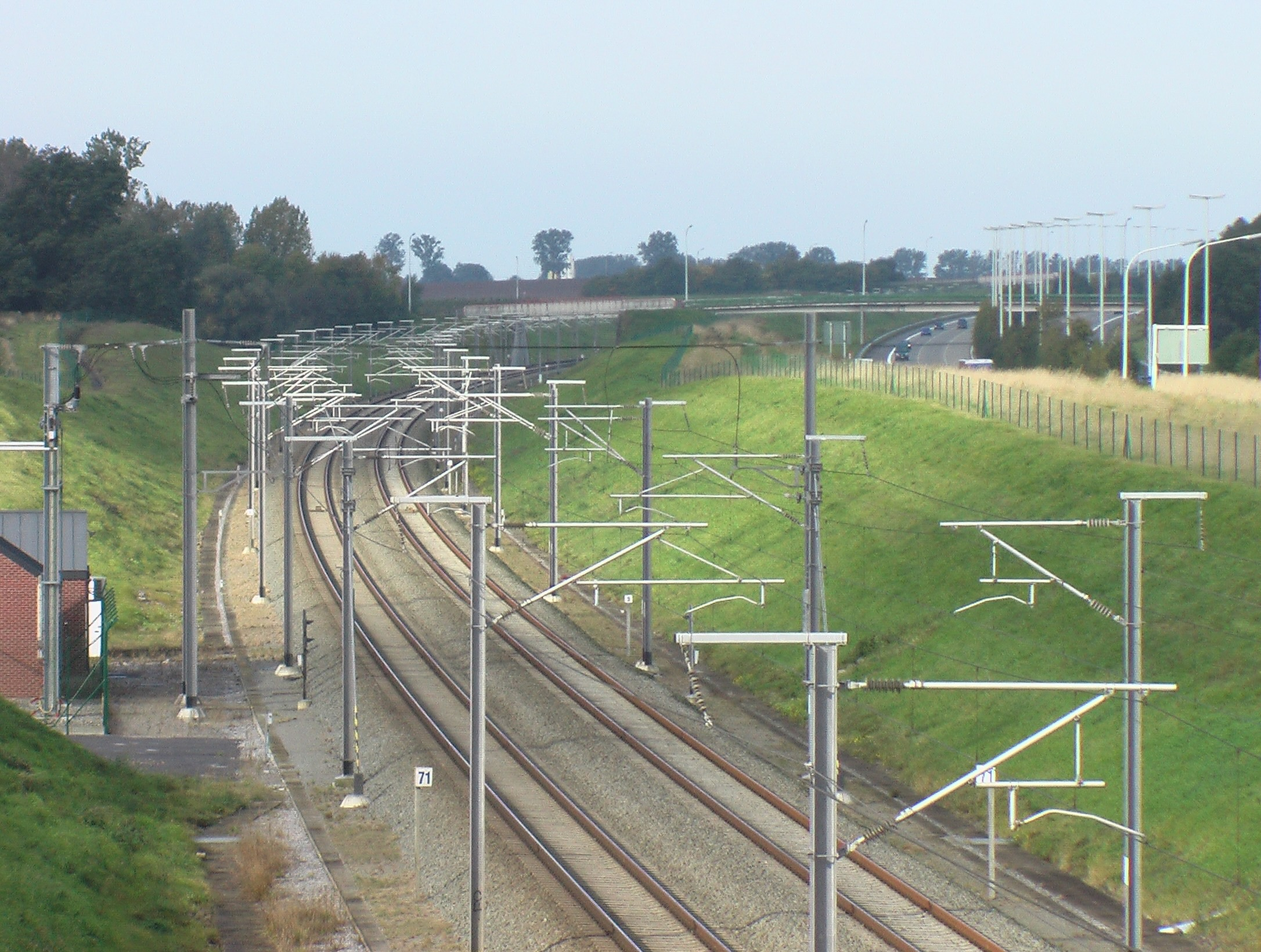
HSL 2 near Berloz alongside A3/E40

From Brussels South, trains travel northwards over Line 0 through Central and North stations. At Schaarbeek the route splits in two; northward bound trains continue over line 25N, line 25, Antwerp and HSL 4 to the Dutch border, eastward bound trains continue over line 36N, line 2 and line 36 to Liège and from there over line 37 and HSL 3 and again line 37 to the German border. Between Schaarbeek and Leuven there are four tracks; the two outer tracks, line 36, permit travel at 160 km/h (99 mph). The two central tracks, line 36N, were planned for 200 km/h (124 mph) direct service and trainsets equipped with ETCS 1 are now allowed to travel at 200 km/h (124 mph).

At Leuven, trains pass through the existing station at 160 km/h (99 mph). Just outside, HSL 2 proper commences with a speed initially limited to 200 km/h (124 mph). After the Bierbeek tunnel (758 m), maximum speed is increased to 300 km/h (186 mph) alongside the E40 motorway. Over the last few kilometers, curbing away from the E40, speed is limited to 220 km/h (137 mph). Quitting HSL 2, trains run to Ans station at 140 km/h (87 mph). Between Ans and Liège-Guillemins station, passenger trains run on the modernised line 36 at a speed of 70 km/h (43 mph) (downwards to Liège) or 140 km/h (87 mph) (EMUs upwards to Ans).

== Other ==
HSL 2 is used by 300 km/h (186 mph) Thalys PBKA sets (now operated by Eurostar), ICE 3neo EMUs on international services, and 200 km/h (124 mph) domestic InterCity services run by sets of Class 18 or Class 13 locomotives with I6, I10 or (mostly) I11 carriages. Trains with the new SNCB Class 18 locomotives appeared on the line. probably in 2010. The DB Velaro D (BR407) was planned to use the route on its way to London, however these plans have since been shelved due to technical and financial problems, and it is unknown if the units will find use on the current ICE International services from Brussels to Germany.

Maintenance bases for the line are situated at Leuven and Ans.

ETCS 1 has been installed on the HSL 2. It is operated from Block 12 in Brussels.

HSL 2 is standard gauge, double track, electrified at 25 kV, 50 Hz AC.

== See also ==
- High-speed rail in Belgium
- Rail transport in Belgium
