= Belgian Railways Class 12 =

Class 12
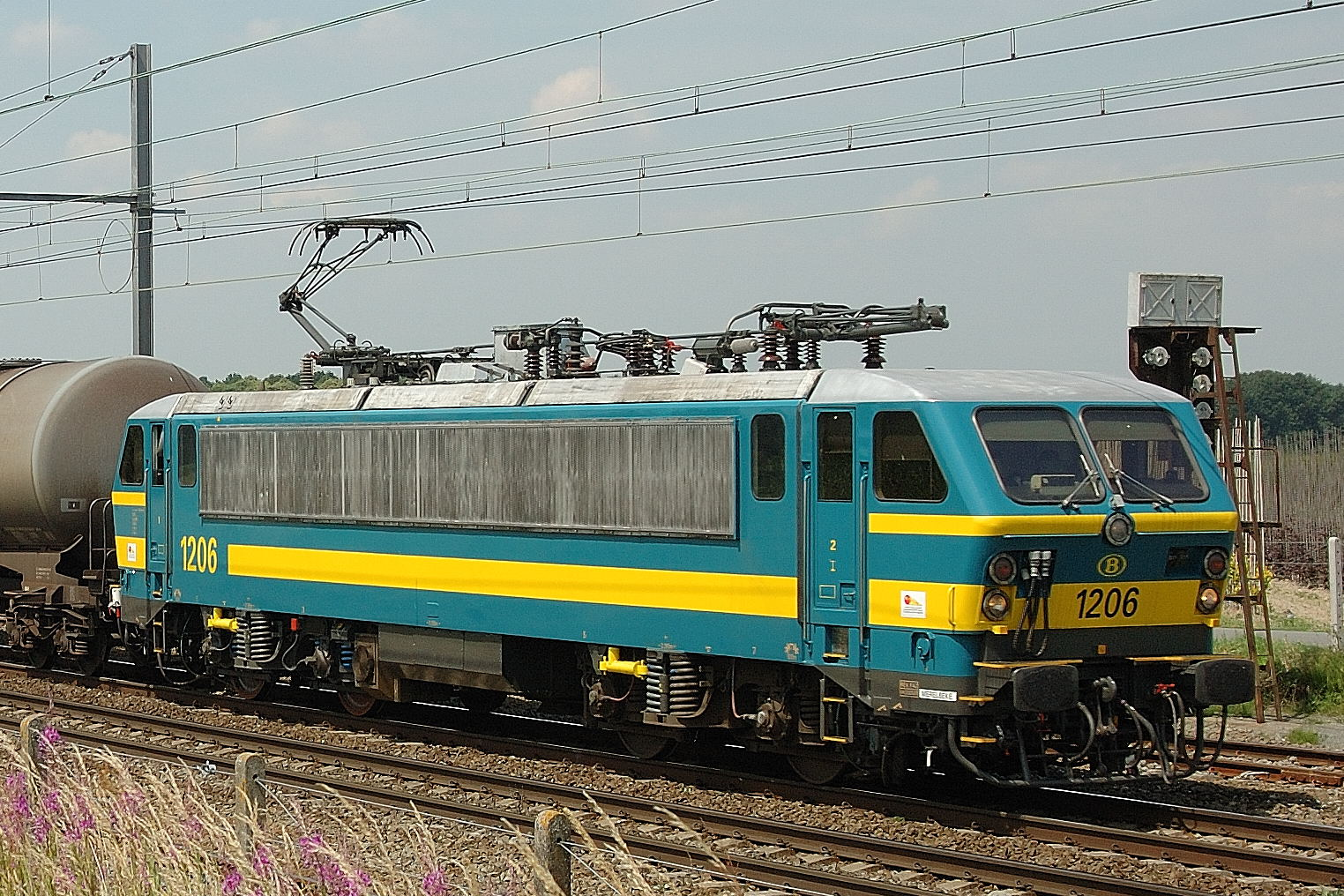
- 1206 with freight train near Schellebelle in June 2009
Type and origin
- Power type: Electric
- Builder: BN/ACEC
- Serial number: 1201-1212
- Build date: 1986 - 1987
- Total produced: 12
Specifications
- Configuration
  - UIC: Bo-Bo
- Gauge: 1,435 mm (4 ft 8 1/2 in) standard gauge
- Driver dia.: 1,250 mm (49.2 in)
- Wheelbase: 9.00 m (29 ft 6 in)
- Length: 18.65 m (61 ft 2 in)
- Width: 2.91 m (9 ft 7 in)
- Height: 4.22 m (13 ft 10 in)
- Loco weight: 85 t (83.66 long tons; 93.70 short tons)
- Electric system/s: 3000 V DC, 25 kV 50 Hz AC
- Current pickup: Pantograph
- Traction motors: LE622S, 4 off
Performance figures
- Maximum speed: 160 km/h (99 mph)
- Power output: 3,130 kW (4,197 hp)
- Tractive effort: 234 kN (53,000 lbf)
Career
- Operators: SNCB/NMBS
- Class: 12
- Numbers: 1201–1212
- Delivered: 1986
- Retired: 2012

The Belgian Railways Class 12 lwere dual-voltage (25000 V, 50 Hz AC and 3000 V DC) electric lomotives built for cross-border service into France. They were based on the single-voltage Class 21 locomotives. They are part of the large 1980s family of 144 electric locomotives.

== Locomotive family ==
The family was made up of Classes 11 (12), 12 (12), 21 (60) and 27 (60). Classes 11, 12 and 21 were nearly twice as powerful as Classes 22, 23 and 25. Class 27 was more than twice as powerful as the 1950s locomotives. This family was heavily influenced by the Class 20² from the mid-1970s. They were very reliable because of the trial and error development of their predecessor. This family came into service with M4 and M5 coaching stock and the AM80 and AM86 series of EMUs. This generation was a major modernization of the SNCB even if the older M2 coaching stock remained active for more than a decade before being replaced. The only real difference between a Class 12 and a Class 21 was the Class 12 had a transformer inside to allow working under both 3000 V DC in Belgium and 25000 V AC plus French signalling and train protection for working in France. Externally they were identical except for a few details.

== Class 12 ==
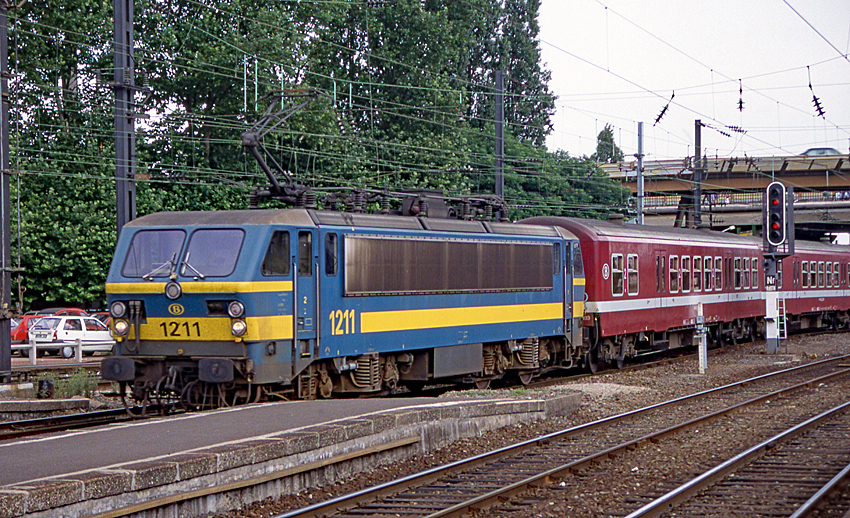
1211 at Lille station in August 1995

Class 12 was originally built to work freight and passenger services between Antwerp (via Gent) and Liège (via Namur) in Belgium on one hand and Lille in France on the other. Class 12 spent most of its early years pushing and pulling rakes of M4 stock across Belgium. Sometimes they ventured onto other domestic services where their 25000 V capability wasn't needed. The introduction of the SNCB Class AM96 electric multiple units displaced them from passenger duty by 1999 but they continued to be used in freight service for 13 more years. Later on they hauled freight between the port of Zeebrugge to Lille and beyond, going via Brugge and Mouscron. They were withdrawn from service in 2012 because Class 13 locomotives had by then lost most of their passenger workings and were available for freight. Class 13 was more powerful and also had the same dual voltage capability as Class 12. All Class 12s were stored at the dêpot of Stokkem, near Arlon, upon withdrawal.

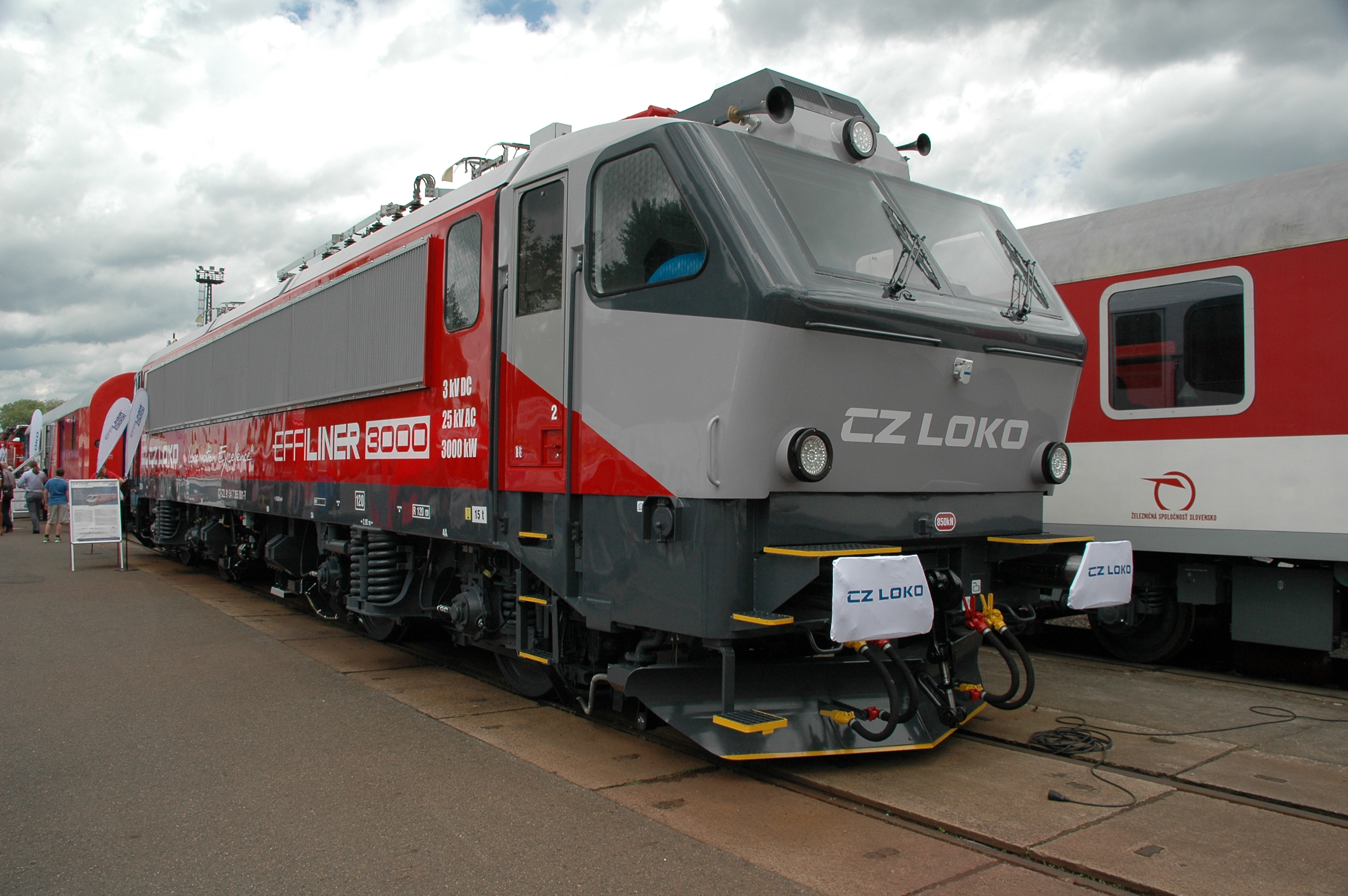
CZ Loko refurbished Class 12 in June 2016

During 2013, locomotive 1203 went to the Czech Republic for service trials. In mid-2014, it was intensively tested at Velim in the Czech Republic under 25kV overhead. It was then sold to open access operator XTR-System Development in the Czech Republic with an option to buy the entire class. The option was taken and the remaining Class 12 locomotives left Belgium in March 2016 en route to their new owner. The same operator also agreed to buy all 12 of the SNCB Class 11 locomotives at the same time but the deal never went through and the locomotives have been sitting outside at Stockem ever since. Class 12 underwent asbestos removal before they departed for the Czech Republic. XTR-System Development has also expressed an interest in buying at least some of the SNCB Class 21 locomotives as they are retired.

Most were overhauled and regeared for a maximum speed of 120 km/h (75 mph) with their train electrical heating removed.
