= Belgian Railways Class 11 =

Class 11
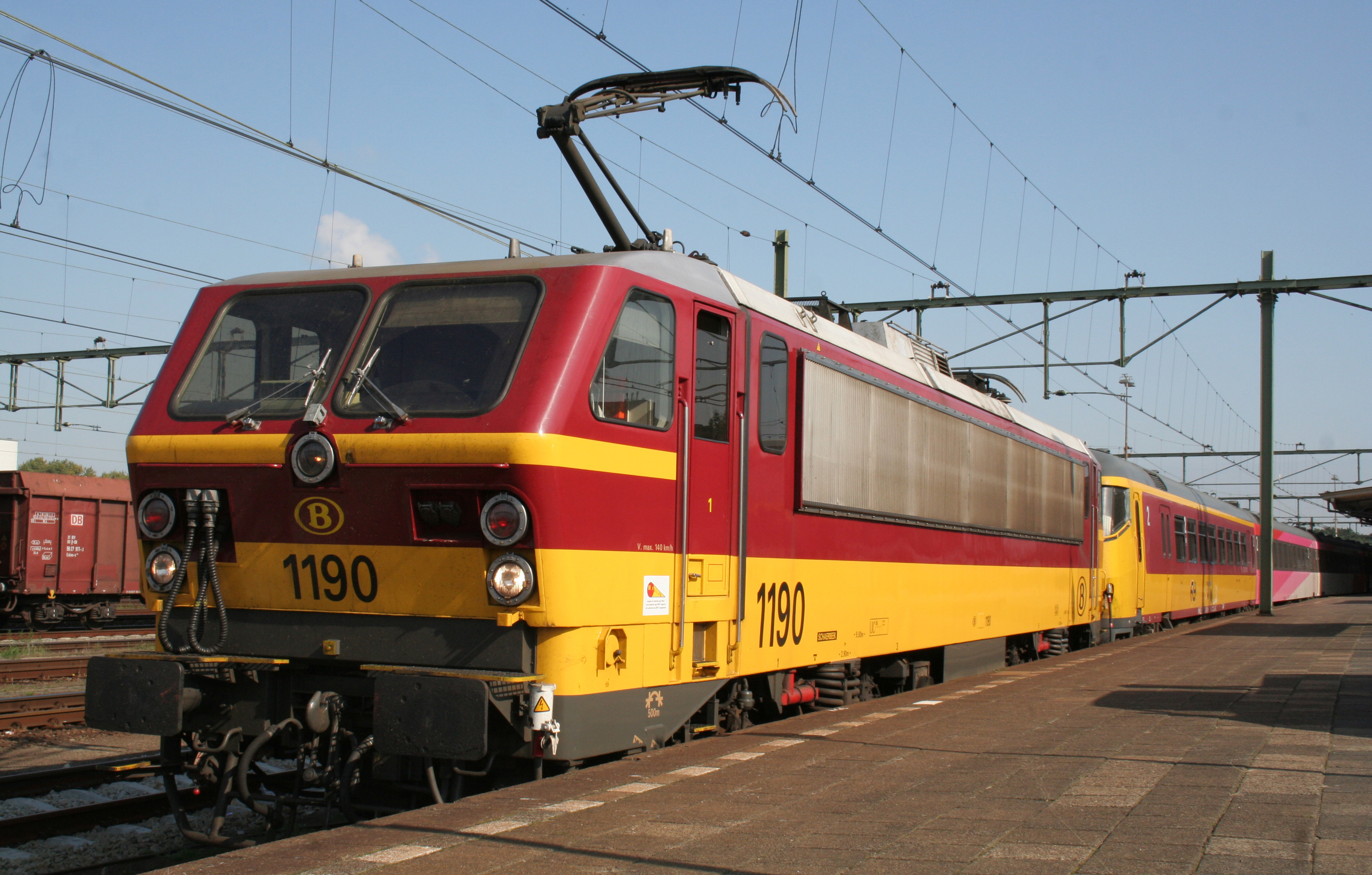
- 1190 at Roosendaal railway station in September 2008
Type and origin
- Power type: Electric
- Builder: BN/ACEC
- Build date: 1985–1986
- Total produced: 12
Specifications
- Configuration
  - UIC: Bo-Bo
- Gauge: 1,435 mm (4 ft 8 1/2 in) standard gauge
- Driver dia.: 1,250 mm (49 in)
- Length: 18.65 m (61 ft 2 in)
- Loco weight: 85 t (84 long tons; 94 short tons)
- Electric system/s: 1500 V DC; 3000 V DC
- Current pickup: Pantograph
Performance figures
- Maximum speed: 140 km/h (87 mph)
- Power output: 3,310 kW (4,440 hp)
- Tractive effort: 234 kN (53,000 lb_{f})
Career
- Operators: SNCB/NMBS
- Class: 11
- Numbers: 1181–1192
- Disposition: All scrapped

The Belgian Railways Class 11 was part of the large 1980s family of 144 electric locomotives. The family was made up of Classes 11 (12), 12 (12), 21 (60) and 27 (60). Classes 11, 12 and 21 were nearly twice as powerful as Classes 22, 23 and 25 while Class 27 was more than twice as powerful as these 1950s locomotives. This family was heavily influenced by the Class 20² from the mid-1970s. They were very reliable because of the trial and error development of their predecessor. This family came into service with M4 and M5 coaching stock and the AM80]and AM86 series of EMUs. This generation was a major modernization of the NMBS/SNCB even if the older M2 coaching stock remained active for more than a decade before being replaced. The only real difference between a Class 11 and a Class 21 was the Class 11 had a transformer inside to allow working under both 3000 V DC in Belgium and 1500 V DC plus Dutch signalling and train protection for working in Holland. Externally they were identical to Classes 12 and 21 aside from the livery and a few minor details.

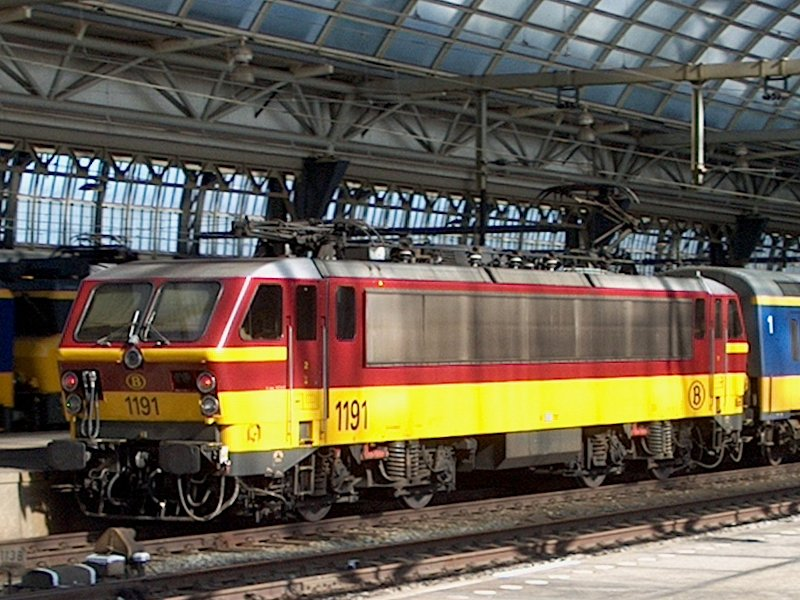
1191 at Amsterdam Centraal station in September 2007

The Class 11 locomotives were built in the 1980s for hauling Benelux trains between Brussels and Amsterdam. They operated in push pull mode, remotely controlled from a leading driving trailer when at the rear of the train. They were numbered 1181-1192 to avoid confusion with NS Class 1100 locos that were still in use at that time. The Dutch Class 11 was originally numbered from 1101 to 1160. In 2009 they were replaced on the Benelux trains by Bombardier Traxx locomotives which had been leased from Alpha Trains. When Class 11 locomotives were replaced on international services they were moved to peak hour services within Belgium for the rest of their working lives before retirement. They are painted to match the Nederlandse Spoorwegen coaching stock they used to work with.

Due to their limited number and intensive use at speeds up to 140 km/h (87 mph), these locomotives aged rapidly after 25 years of service and became subject to frequent failures. Of course that led to frequent service disruptions and many passenger complaints. All Class 11s were stored inside at the dêpot of Stockem, near Arlon, upon withdrawal late in 2012. In mid-2014, similar loco 1203 was intensively tested in the Czech Republic at Velim under 25000 volt overhead and did very well. It was then sold to open access operator XTR-System Development in the Czech Republic with an option to buy the entire class. The option was taken and the remaining Class 11 locos were transferred to their new operator early in 2016. The same operator also agreed to buy 11 ( of the SNCB 12 Class 11 locomotives at the same time but the deal never went through and the locos have been sitting outside at Stockem ever since 1187 was/is preserved by The SNCB Historical Patrimonium. As of May 2020, they are reported to have been sold, presumably for scrapping, with the exception of 1187 which is kept in a museum.

On 11 August 1999, locomotive 1187 became the first of its class to work on anything other than the Benelux service that they were designed and purchased for. It operated from Brussels Midi to Arlon, near Luxembourg, and return for a rather strange reason. SNCB wanted to run a special train that day because of a total solar eclipse. The eclipse would be much more noticeable in the southeast of Belgium than around Brussels or anywhere else in the country. 1187 must have been the only newer loco available at Schaarbeek depot that morning or perhaps it just happened to be the only one that was parked where it wasn't necessary to move other locomotives or coaches for it to leave the depot. Either way, this should not have happened as there was an agreement between SNCB and NS that these 12 locomotives and their coaches were only to be used on the Benelux service.

All had been withdrawn by 2013.
