= Class 19 =

Class 19 may refer to:

- Caledonian Railway 19 Class, 0-4-4T steam locomotives
- Belgian Railways Class 19, electric locomotives
- British Rail Class 19, an experimental locomotive
- DRG Class 19, 2-8-2 express train, tender locomotives of the Deutsche Reichsbahn:
  - DRG Class 19.0: Saxon XX HV
  - DRB Class 19.1: PKP class Pt31
  - DRB Class 19.10
- GER Class T19
- KTM Class 19, diesel-electric shunting locomotives
- New South Wales Z19 class locomotive, 0-6-0 steam locomotives
- O 19-class submarine

== See also ==
- No.19 class minesweeper
