= Belgian Railways Class 27 =

Class 27
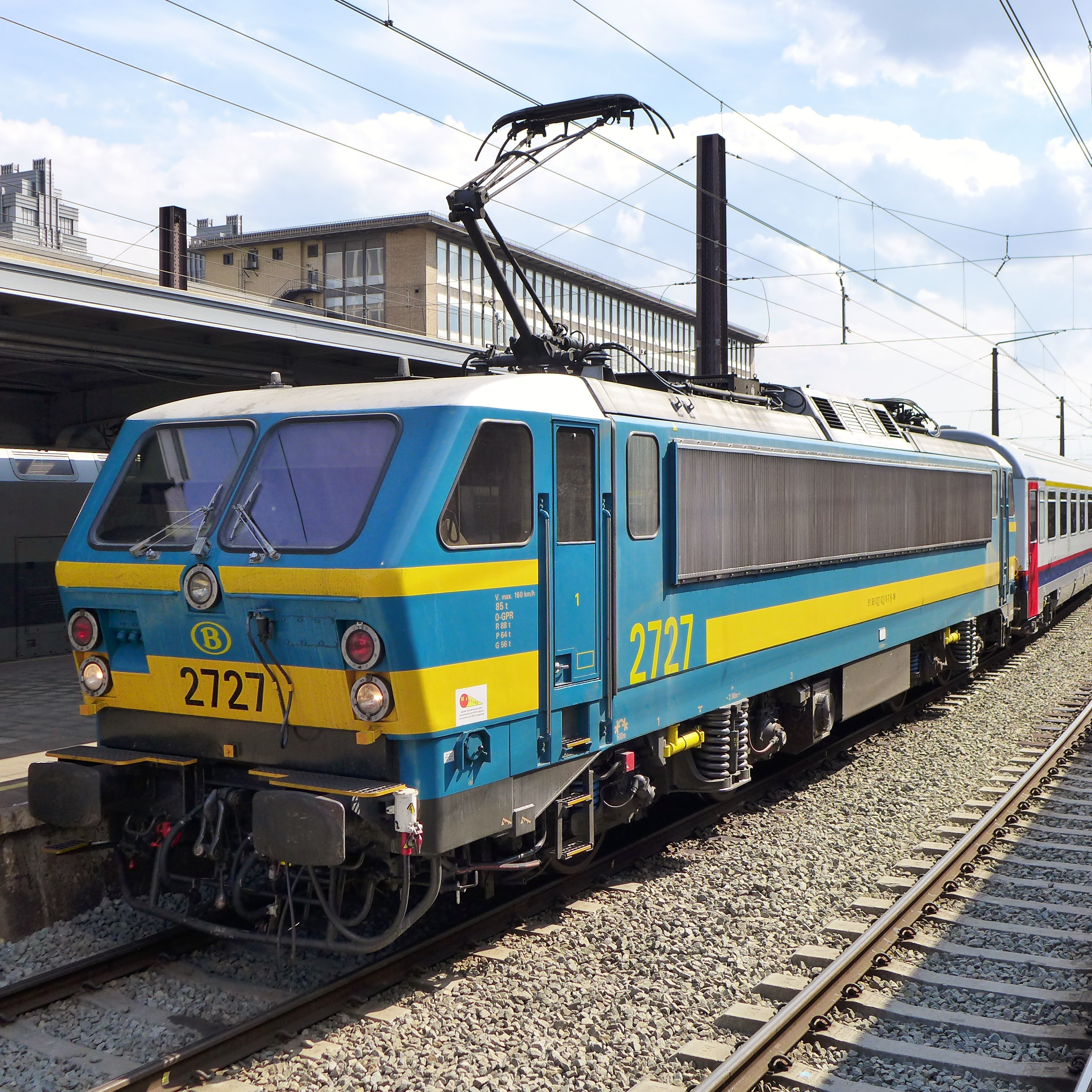
- 2727 at Brussels-South station in June 2014
Type and origin
- Power type: Electric
- Builder: BN/ACEC
- Build date: 1981–1984
- Total produced: 60
Specifications
- Configuration
  - UIC: Bo-Bo
- Gauge: 1,435 mm (4 ft 8 1/2 in) standard gauge
- Driver dia.: 1,250 mm (49.2 in)
- Length: 18.65 m (61 ft 2 in)
- Width: 2.91 m (9 ft 7 in)
- Height: 4.22 m (13 ft 10 in)
- Adhesive weight: 10.5 t (10.3 long tons; 11.6 short tons)
- Loco weight: 85 t (83.66 long tons; 93.70 short tons)
- Electric system/s: 3000 V DC
- Current pickup: Pantograph
Performance figures
- Maximum speed: 160 km/h (99 mph)
- Power output: 4,190 kW (5,619 hp) continuous; 4,250 kW (5,699 hp) one hour
- Tractive effort: 234 kN (53,000 lbf)
Career
- Operators: SNCB/NMBS
- Class: 27
- Number in class: 0 (all withdrawn)
- Numbers: 2701–2760
- Delivered: 1981–1984

Class 27 were the first of the Belgian Railways' large 1980s family of 144 electric locomotives. The family was made up of Classes 11 (12), 12 (12), 21 (60) and 27 (60). Classes 11, 12 and 21 were nearly twice as powerful as the preceding classes 22, 23 and 25. The Class 27 was more than twice as powerful as these 1950s locomotives. The family was heavily influenced by the Class 20^{2} locomotives built in the mid 1970s. They were very reliable because of the trial and error development of their predecessors. This family came into service with M4 and M5 coaching stock and the AM80 and AM86 series of electric multiple units. This generation was a major modernisation even if the older M2 coaching stock remained active for more than a decade. These four sister classes were visually identical except for a few minor details. Class 11's livery was specific to the Benelux service, which they operated for most of their service lives.

Class 27 locomotives have been the staple power for SNCB/NMBS for over 40 years. They worked all over the 3000 volt electrified lines including the occasional trip through to Luxembourg City. The arrival of Class 13 had little impact on Class 27 at the time as the 13s were occupied with trains of I11 coaching stock and goods trains working on newly electrified sections under 25,000 volts, 50 Hz, where Class 27s could not go. Class 27s were frequently engaged in pulling heavy freights from the Flemish ports to the sorting yard at Montzen, near the German border. They also pulled a number of passenger services including peak hour trains of M5 double deck coaching stock.

They became very active on trains with the newer M6 stock. Locomotives 2742 to 2760 were modified with MUX and automatic couplers at one end so they could work in multiple in push-pull trains made up of two Class 27s each with a rake of five M6 coaches running one behind the other. The trains started at separate destinations and joined up later to run together as a unit over most of their route. Later they split up and went their separate ways to their final destinations and reversed for the return journey. These locos had been showing frame wear because they were not originally designed for this kind of service so SNCB was monitoring them closely. These MUX locomotives were replaced on freight duties by Class 13, which have lost most of their passenger duties.

Locomotive 2711 holds the world record for the longest passenger train ever hauled by a single locomotive. Set on 27 April 1991, it hauled 70 carriages from Gent to Oostende.

As at April 2023, 46 remained in service with two having been sold to Certus Rail Solutions.

The final locomotives of this class were withdrawn from regular service in December 2025 along their sister Class 21, with the railway operator citing their incompatibility with ETCS, which will become mandatory in 2027, as well as sufficient availability of new M7 sets.
