= Belgian Railways Class 21 =

Class 21
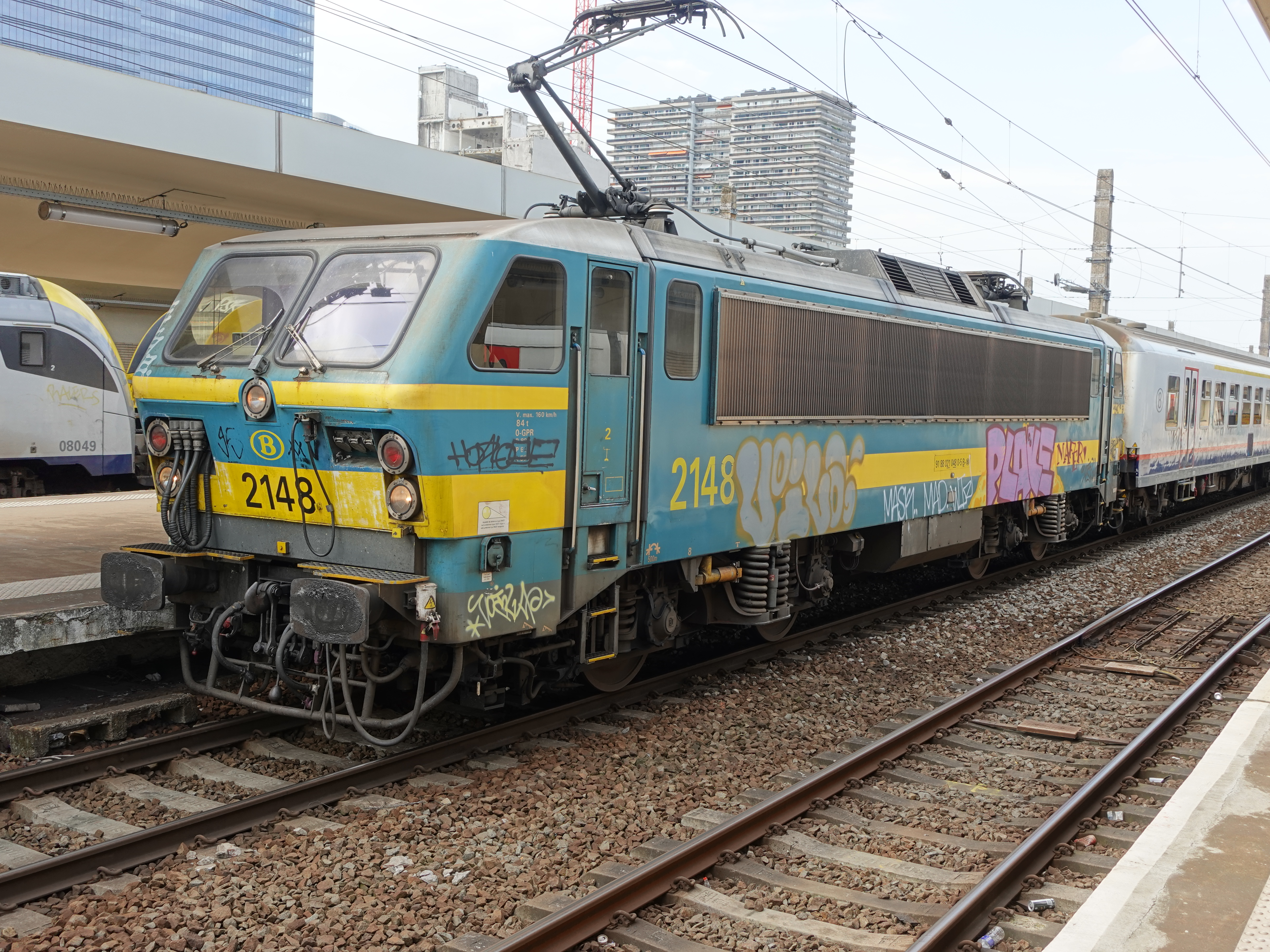
- 2148 at Brussels-North in July 2024
Type and origin
- Power type: Electric
- Builder: BN/ACEC
- Build date: 1984-1987
- Total produced: 60
Specifications
- Configuration
  - UIC: Bo-Bo
- Gauge: 1,435 mm (4 ft 8 1/2 in) standard gauge
- Driver dia.: 1,250 mm (49.2 in)
- Length: 18.65 m (61 ft 2 in)
- Width: 2.91 m (9 ft 7 in)
- Height: 4.22 m (13 ft 10 in)
- Adhesive weight: 10.5 t (10.3 long tons; 11.6 short tons)
- Loco weight: 84 t (83 long tons; 93 short tons)
- Electric system/s: 3000 V DC
- Current pickup: Pantograph
Performance figures
- Power output: 3,310 kilowatts (4,440 bhp)
Career
- Operators: SNCB/NMBS
- Class: 21
- Number in class: 0 (all withdrawn)
- Numbers: 2101-2160

SNCB Class 21 is part of the large 1980s family of 144 electric locomotives. The family was made up of Classes 11 (12), 12 (12), 21 (60) and 27 (60). Classes 11, 12 and 21 were nearly twice as powerful as Classes 22, 23 and 25 while Class 27 was more than twice as powerful as the 1950s locomotives. This family was heavily influenced by the Class 20 from the mid-1970s. The 1980s locomotives were very reliable because of the trial and error development of their predecessor. This family came into service with M4 and M5 coaching stock and the AM80 and AM86 classes of electric multiple units. This generation was a major modernization of the SNCB even if the older M2 coaching stock remained active for more than a decade before being replaced. These four sister classes are visually identical except for a few minor details. Class 11's bordeaux and yellow livery is specific to the Benelux service which they powered for most of their service lives.

Class 21 locomotives, although lower in power than the Class 27s, worked interchangeably with them for the most part. They hauled both passenger and freight trains. They were frequently seen pushing or pulling trains made of M4 and M5 coaching stock around the system.

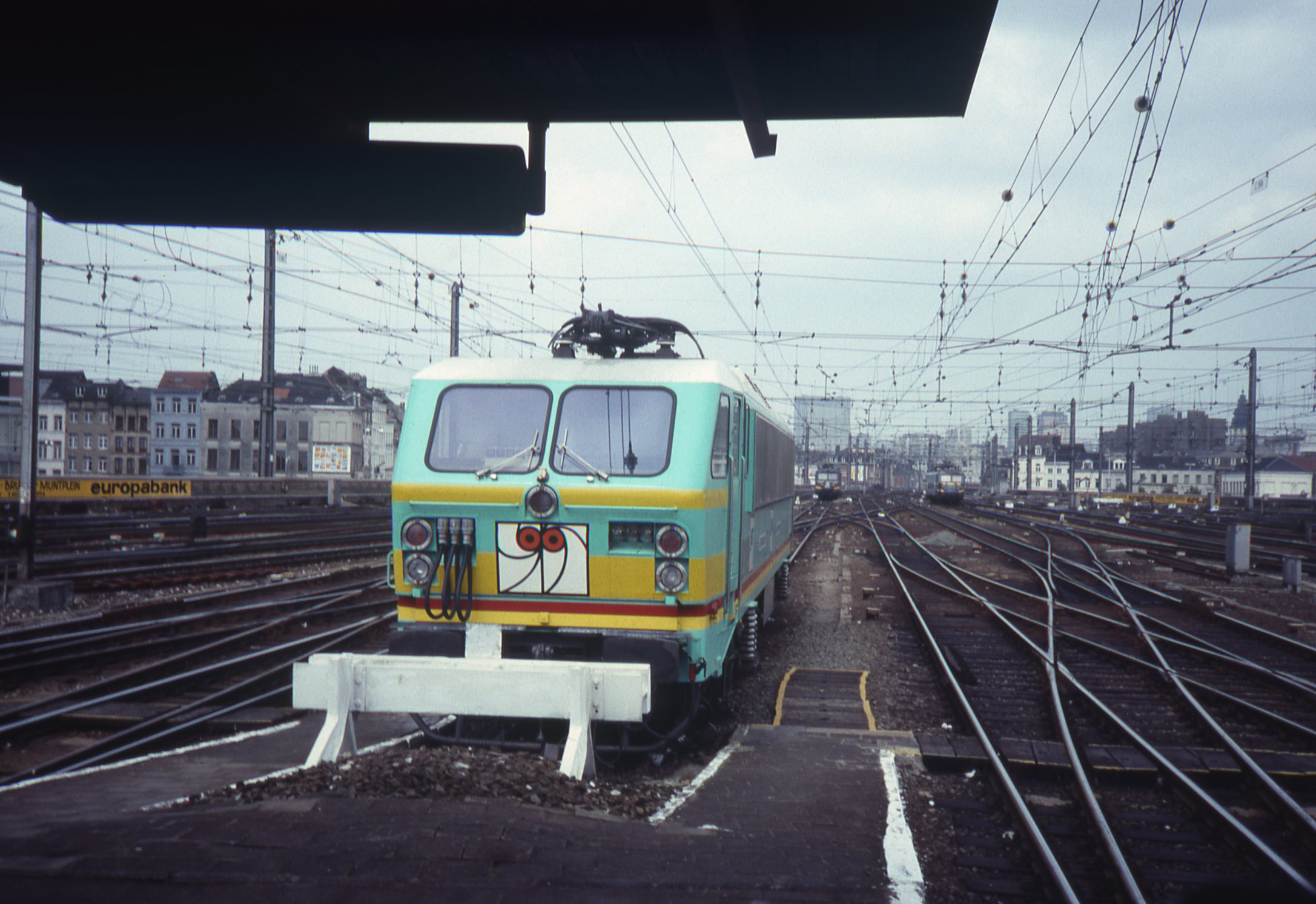
2109 at Brussels-South in 1989

In May 1989, locomotive 2109 was repainted in turquoise to haul a matched set of wagons for the Technorame train. This train was sponsored by the regional government of Wallonie and traveled around French-speaking Belgium displaying various high-tech items to the public for several months. At the end of this contract it re-entered regular service on both freight and passenger trains while still wearing its special colors. This continued for at least two months before it was repainted in the normal colors for the class.

During 1993 locomotive 2130 was converted for use as a test bed for the development of the future Class 13. It was renumbered into Class 19 as 1901 for the testing program and was the only member of the class. It also gained triphase traction motors and a transformer that let it work under both 3000 volts DC and 25000 volts, 50 Hz AC plus French safety equipment and operated into Lille-Flandres station in France a number of times while in regular service. By 2001 the testing was complete and it was restored to standard with its original number of 2130.

Locomotive 2119 was involved in the severe collision at Buizingen, just north of Halle on Line 96, in 2010.

Withdrawals started in early 2014 as NMBS/SNCB decided that it had a surplus of electric locomotives after the Class 18 and Class 19 were delivered from Siemens. Most Class 21 locomotives from 2101 to 2130 were withdrawn by the December 2014 timetable change. Most of 2101 to 2130 have been stripped for spares and had asbestos removed before scrapping. Classes 21 and 27 share many interchangeable parts. A major worry has been the traction motor blowers for Class 27. The company that made them in the 1980s was no longer in business during the final years of the locomotive's operation, so the Class 21s served as a spares bank to keep the Class 27s, which are more powerful, in service.

In 2022, some were sold to Seville Rail Rent with the intention of offering them to Polish railway operators as a replacement for older EU07 series locomotives.

The final locomotives were withdrawn from service in December 2025 along with their sister Class 27, with the railway operator citing their incompatibility with ETCS, which will become mandatory in 2027, as well as sufficient availability of new M7 sets.
