= Belgian Railways Class 18 (Siemens) =

Class of 120 BelgianRailways electric locomotives

HLE 18, HLE 19 EuroSprinter ES60U3
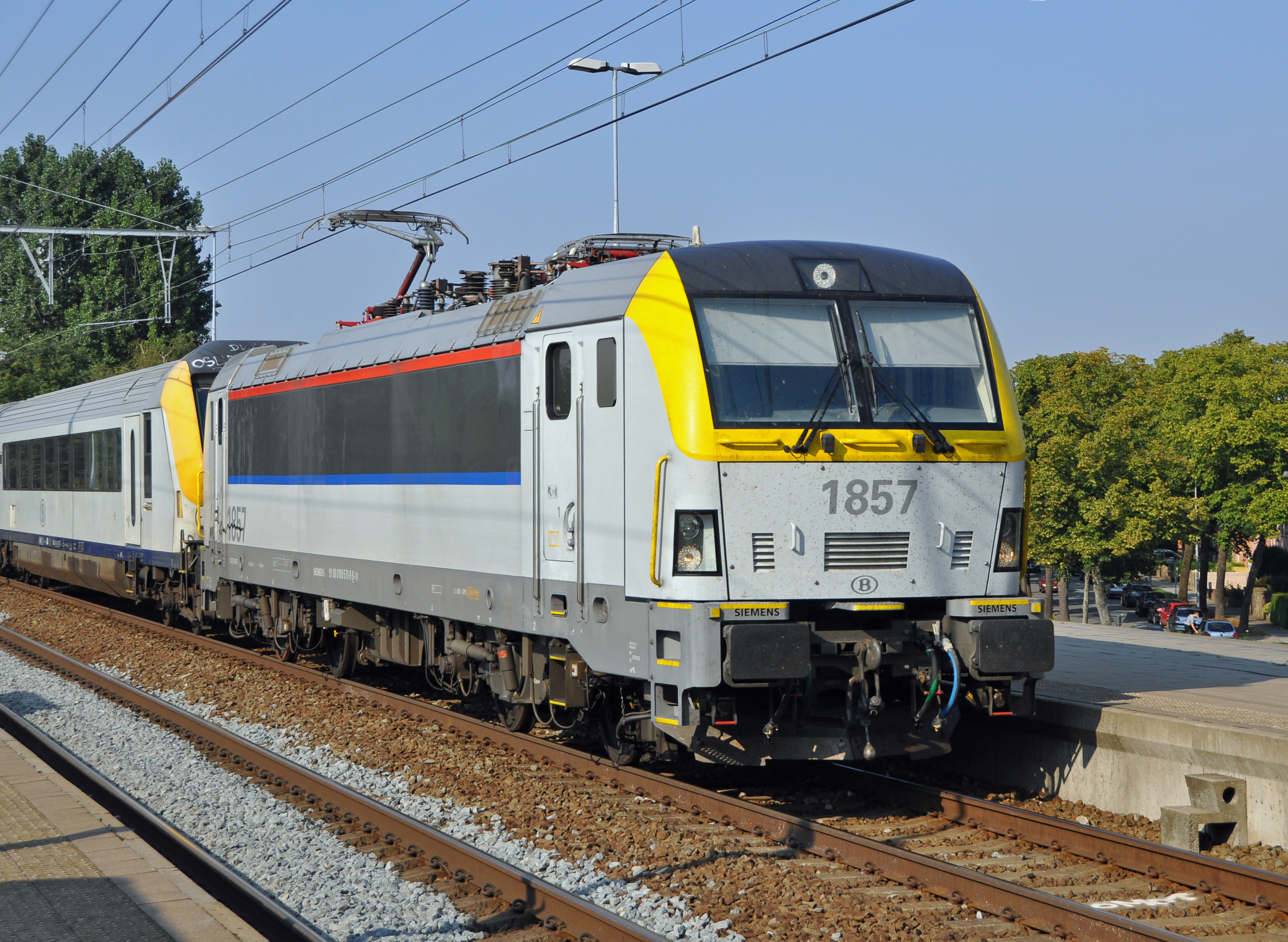
- 1857 at Brugge-Sint-Pieters railway station.
Type and origin
- Power type: Electric
- Builder: Siemens
- Model: EuroSprinter ES60U3
- Build date: first 60 : 2008-2010 second 60 : 2010-2011
Specifications
- Configuration
  - UIC: Bo′Bo′
- Gauge: 1,435 mm (4 ft 8 1/2 in) standard gauge
- Wheel diameter: 1,250 mm (49 in)
- Length: 19,580 mm (64 ft 3 in)
- Loco weight: 88 t (86.61 long tons; 97.00 short tons)
- Electric system/s: 3,000 V DC; 1,500 V DC; 25 kV 50 Hz AC
- Current pickup: 2 Pantographs (DC or 25 kV 50 Hz)
- Transmission: Electric
- Loco brake: disc brakes, rheostatic/regenerative electrical braking
- Train brakes: pneumatic
- Safety systems: ETCS 1 and 2, Memor, KVB, TBL1, TBL1+, TBL2
Performance figures
- Maximum speed: 200 km/h (125 mph)
- Power output: 25 kV AC, or 3 kV DC 5 MW (6,700 hp) peak 6 MW (8,000 hp) for 20min. 1.5 kV 2.4 MW (3,200 hp) /2.5 MW (3,400 hp)
- Tractive effort: 300 kN (67,000 lbf) @0 km/h (0 mph); 250 kN (56,000 lbf) @ 72 km/h (45 mph)
- Brakeforce: 150 kN (34,000 lbf) max regenerative braking power 2.4 MW (3,200 hp) under 3 kV, 5 MW (6,700 hp) under 25 kV AC and 3 kV DC. rheostatic braking power 2.6 MW (3,500 hp) under 3 kV or 1.5 kV DC.
Career
- Operators: SNCB/NMBS
- Class: HLE 18 & 19
- Number in class: 120
- Numbers: 1801-1896, 1901-1924
- Delivered: 2009-2012
- Technical information : except where noted

The SNCB/NMBS HLE 18 (Siemens class ES60U3) are a series of four axle Bo′Bo′ multivoltage electric Siemens EuroSprinter locomotives ordered in two batches of sixty in 2006 and 2008.

The locomotives were supplied for use by SNCB/NMBS (Belgian national railways) on passenger services.

Ninety-six of the class form the HLE 18 class, 24 units fitted with an automatic central coupler form the SNCB HLE 19 class.

== History ==
An order for 60 units, value €211 million, was placed in December 2006 for delivery between January 2009 and June 2010. In December 2008, an option to order 60 more locomotives was exercised for an amount of € 222M, for delivery between June 2010 and April 2012.

The locomotives were ordered to replace Belgian Railways Class 13, Class 21 and Class 27 locomotives on passenger intercity services. The Class 13 were mostly displaced on freight trains while the Class 21 and 27 took over slower passenger trains; this allowed the withdrawal of outdated Belgian Railways Class 23 and 26 locomotives as well as the younger but troublesome Class 20. While belonging to the EuroSprinter family of locomotives, the Class 18 units use a new exterior cab design (similar to the CP Class 4700 ordered by Comboios de Portugal around the same time), that would later be used on the later Vectron locomotives and the upcoming ÖBB Nightjet Siemens Viaggio Comfort Next Level rakes.

Locomotive number 1860 was officially presented at InnoTrans in 2008. The first unit, number 1801 was transferred to the Velim railway test circuit for testing in December 2008.

On March 3, 2009, the first unit (roadnumber 1802) was officially delivered to SNCB/NMBS for test and homologation purpose. Homologation issues delayed commercial introduction (originally planned for the summer schedule - May 2011), as a result Siemens was obliged to pay the maximum amount of penalties (€21.12 million).

In July 2011 the first revenue earning Intercity services ran, under temporary approval. The type received homologation certification for use in Belgium in late 2011.
