= Belgian Railways Class 19 =

Class 19
Type and origin
- Power type: Electric
- Builder: BN/ACEC
- Build date: 1993
- Total produced: 1
Specifications
- Configuration
  - UIC: Bo′Bo′
- Gauge: 1,435 mm (4 ft 8 1/2 in) standard gauge
- Driver dia.: 1,250 mm (49.21 in)
- Length: 18.65 m (61 ft 2 in)
- Height: 3.60 m (11 ft 10 in)
- Loco weight: 88 t (86.61 long tons; 97.00 short tons)
- Electric system/s: 25 kV 50 Hz AC; 3000 V DC
- Current pickup(s): Pantograph
- Traction motors: ACEC AM144D
Performance figures
- Maximum speed: 160 km/h (99 mph)
- Power output: 4,500 kW (6,000 hp)
- Tractive effort: 280 kN (63,000 lbf)
Career
- Operators: SNCB/NMBS
- Class: 19
- Number in class: 1
- Numbers: 1901

Class 19 is a class of electric locomotives operated by NMBS/SNCB, the state train operator of Belgium.

During 1993 Class 21 locomotive 2130 was converted for use as a test bed for the development of future class 13.

It was renumbered into Class 19 as 1901 for the testing program and was the only member of the class. The traction motors were replaced with asynchronous motors. It also gained a transformer that let it work under 25000 volts, 50 Hz AC and French signalling and train protection systems. The 3000 Volts DC capability was retained. The reason for this was because Class 13 was to be a dual voltage locomotive running on the same voltages with the same type of motors. 1901 operated into Lille Flandres station in France many times as part of the testing process. By 2001 the testing was completed and it was restored to standard with its original number of 2130.

In 2014, NMBS/SNCB decided to stop the first half of Class 21 (2101-2130). Part of this was because they had too many electric locomotives and part of it was because there was a need for otherwise unobtainable spare parts to keep Class 27 in service. These Class 21s will have their asbestos removed and be stripped of parts and scrapped in the near future. The second half of Class 21 is expected to meet the same fate by the end of 2015.
