= Type 22 =

Type 22 may refer to:

- Type 22 (radar) Japanese World War II radar
- Murata Type 22 rifle, a rifle of the Imperial Japanese Army
- Type 22 frigate, a Royal Navy frigate class.
- Type 22 missile boat, a People's Liberation Army Navy fast attack craft
- Type 22 pillbox, a British World War II defence structure

== See also ==
- Class 22 (disambiguation)
