= NMBS/SNCB I11 coach =

I11
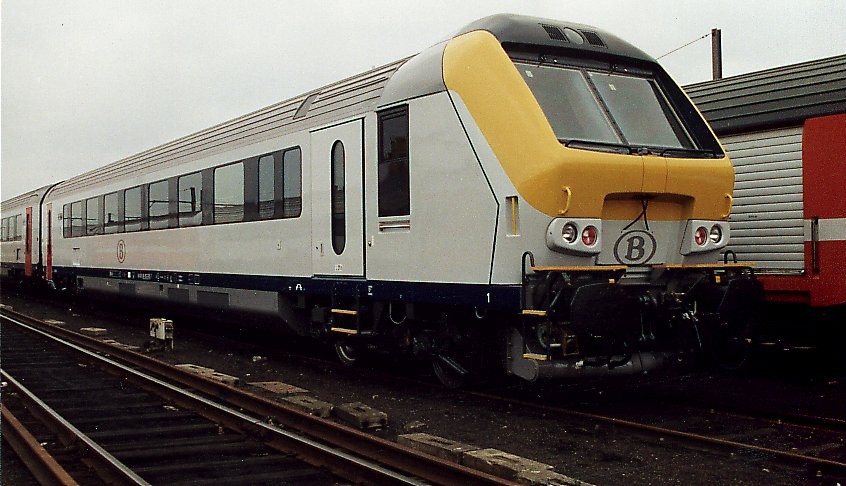
- I11BDx coach in Ostend
- Manufacturers: Bombardier Transportation and La Brugeoise et Nivelles
- Order no.: A: 36 B: 106 BDX: 21
- Built at: Bruges, Belgium
- Constructed: 1995–1997

Specifications
- Maximum speed: 200 km/h (124 mph)

The I11 is a type of passenger car used since 1995 in the network of the Belgian railway company NMBS/SNCB for long distance (InterCity) trains.

== Description ==
The carriages were built by Bombardier and BN in Bruges, Belgium between 1995 and 1997. Three types were constructed: 36 of an "A type" with 60 first class seats in [2+1] configuration, 106 of a "B type" with 80 second class seats in [2+2] formation, and 21 "BDx type" control cars with 58 second class seats and incorporating a driving cab.

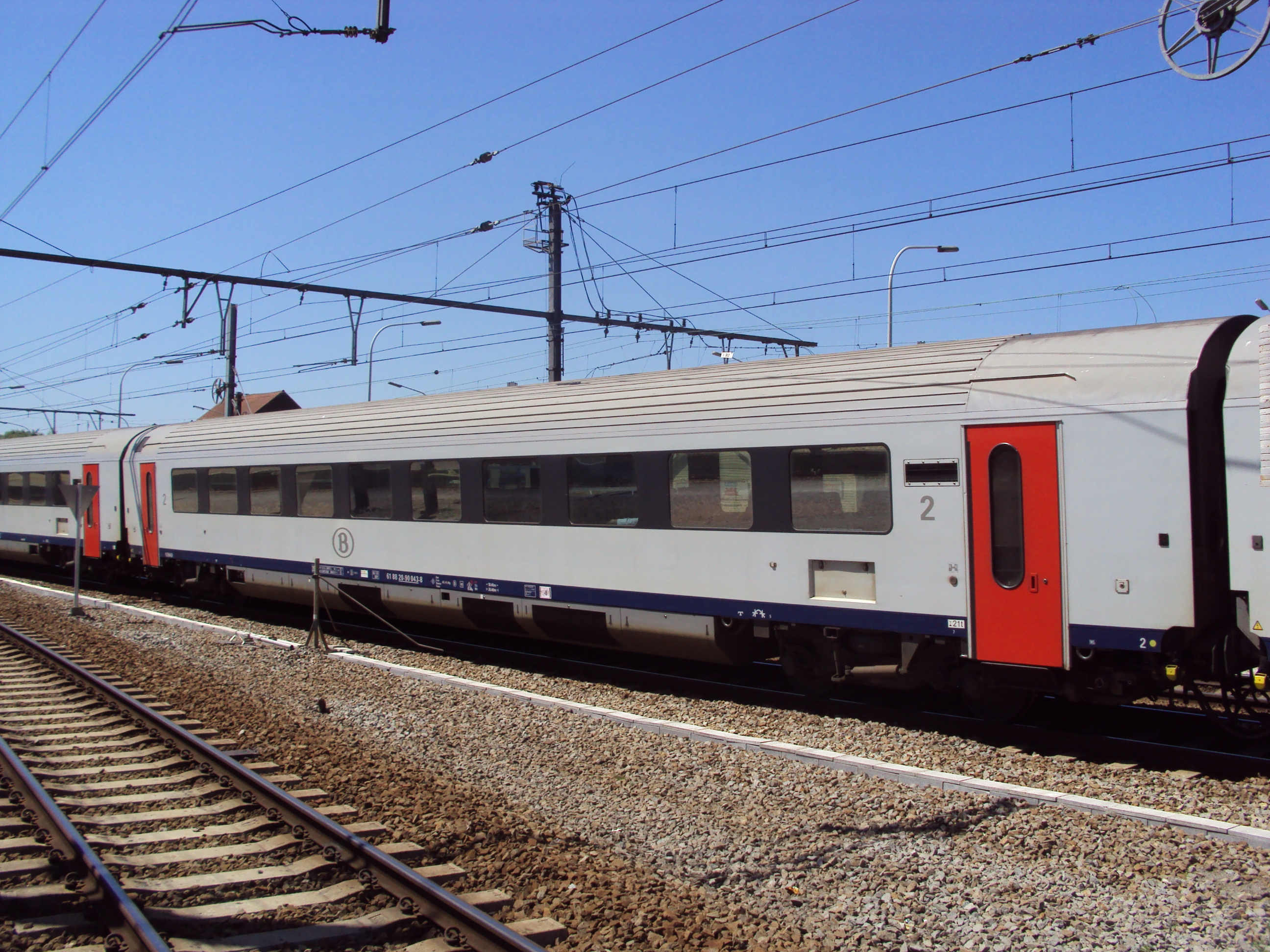
An NMBS/SNCB I11 second class coach in the middle of a train

The designation "I" indicates that the vehicle is also suitable for international traffic, but they are mostly used for work inside Belgium; they have been used for international services including to Milan (Italy), and Chur and Brig (Switzerland) in the early 2000s. The carriages have air conditioning and electronic displays, and a top operating speed of 200 km/h (120 mph) with good ride quality and low sound levels, the bogies are an ANF type.

They can operate in push pull mode with NMBS/SNCB Class 13 or Class 18 locomotives, the units have also been used with two control cars and a mid-train locomotive.

The I11 coaches are mainly used with double decker M7 Cars on the IC-01 Eupen - Ostend route.

== See also ==
- Corail (train)
- China Railway 25T coach
