= Belgian Railways Class 13 =

Electric locomotive

NMBS/SNCB series 13 Tractis
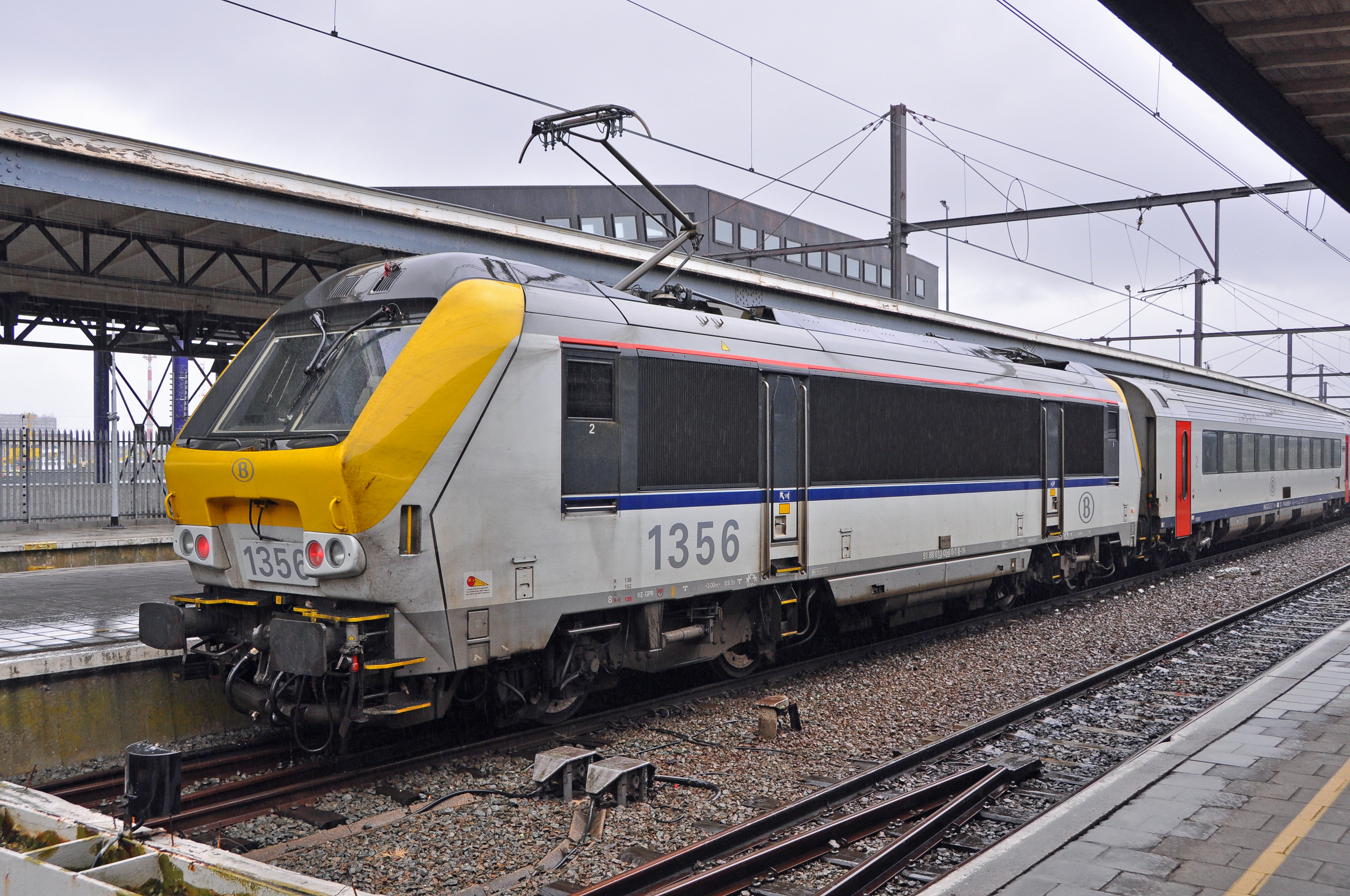
- NMBS/SNCB Class 13 loco 1356 at Ostend station, 10 June 2011.
Type and origin
- Power type: Electric
- Builder: Alstom (Charleroi/Belfort); Bombardier Transportation (BN, Bruges)
- Build date: 1997–2001
- Total produced: 60
Specifications
- Configuration
  - UIC: Bo′Bo′
- Gauge: 1,435 mm (4 ft 8 1/2 in) standard gauge
- Driver dia.: 1,160 to 1,090 mm (45.67 to 42.91 in) (new/worn)
- Wheelbase: 3.000 m (9 ft 10.1 in) (bogie); 10.400 m (34 ft 1.4 in) (between bogie centres)
- Length: 19.11 m (62 ft 8 in)
- Width: 3.026 m (9 ft 11 in)
- Height: 4.275 m (14 ft 0 in)
- Loco weight: 90 t (88.58 long tons; 99.21 short tons)
- Electric system/s: 25 kV AC, 3 kV DC, 1.5 kV DC
- Current pickup: Pantograph
- Loco brake: Electro-pneumatic / rheostatic / electro-regenerative
- Safety systems: KVB (SNCF), TBL2 (NMBS/SNCB)
Performance figures
- Maximum speed: 200 km/h (124 mph)
- Power output: 5,200 kW (7,000 hp) under 25 kV AC or 3 kV DC; 2,100 kW (2,800 hp) under 1.5 kV DC
- Tractive effort: 288 kN (65,000 lbf) (starting)
Career
- Operators: SNCB/NMBS
- Numbers: 1301–1360
- Sources: except where noted

The Class 13 are a type of mixed use 200 km/h (124 mph) multivoltage electric locomotive of type Traxis designed by Alstom in the late 1990s for the Belgian and Luxembourgish railways (CFL Class 3000).

The locomotives operate push-pull trains with coaches of type I11, as well as freight trains.

Since 2012, NMBS/SNCB assigned more and more locomotives to their freight subsidiary due to the introduction of the Class 18 into passenger service.

== History ==
=== Background ===
At the beginning of the 1990s SNCB/NMBS had a requirement to renew its mainline locomotive fleet: it required fast high power passenger locomotives for intercity trains on lines between Ostend, Brussels, Liege and Eupen, as well as needing replacements for diesel locomotive classes 52, 53 and 54 which dated to the 1950s and were used on freight trains for the steel industry on the Athus-Meuse line and into Luxembourg. These requirements led to the decision to purchase a universal locomotive design. The design specifications included a minimum top speed of 200 kilometres per hour (120 mph) and capability to operate under 3 kV DC and 25 kV AC electrification.

Luxembourg state rail company CFL also had a locomotive fleet dating from the 1950/60s, including electric CFL 3600s and GM-EMD diesel engined locomotives CFL 1800. The company also planned to electrify its entire network, the majority at 25 kV AC, as well as 3 kV DC. In December 1992 CFL reached an agreement to jointly procure locomotives with NMBS/SNCB, with the Belgian company leading the procurement process.

The procurement specifications were published in March 1993, accepted bidders were listed in September 1993, with bids received in February 1994. On 22 December 1995 NMBS/SNCB and CFL made a joint order with ACEC-Transport (subsidiary of GEC-Alstom) for 80 units; Alstom's offer was costed at 140.5million Belgian francs per locomotive; NMBS/SNCB and CFL ordered 60 and 20 units respectively of identically specified locomotives, with deliveries beginning in 1998. At the same time as the class 13 order NMBS/SNCB ordered 21 control cars of type I11 for use with the locomotives on passenger services.

Traction and electrical equipment for the class (including 25 kV AC drive, asynchronous motors and GTO inverter technology) was tested on a converted Class 21 locomotive. (Note: Belgian Railways Class 21 number 2130 was converted (1993/4, in service January 1995), and renumbered as Class 19 number 1901. In 2001 the locomotive was converted back to its original form.) Pantograph equipment for the class was tested on class 27 number 2719.

=== Design and construction ===
Input to the design came from ACEC Transport (Charleroi) designing the electrical system and undertaking project coordination, other contributors were: Alstom, Le Creusot manufacture of the first 30 bogies, the remainder by Stork RMO (Netherlands); Pauwels supplied transformers; Alstom, Ornans, traction motors; the first 10 locomotives were manufactured at Alstom, Belfort, the remainder at Bombardier Transportation's factory in Belgium (La Brugeoise et Nivelles, Bruges). Faiveley (pantographs) and Knorr (brake equipment) also supplied components.

The mechanical equipment was identical to the contemporary SNCF BB 36000 Astride: the main frame is constructed of corrosion resistant steel, with 6MJ crash absorbance zones at either end; the locomotive bodywork is of copper plated steel. There are two air conditioned driving cabs, and a central equipment section containing electric and pneumatic equipment, accessed by side corridors. Both primary and secondary suspension are by coil spring with shock absorbers. The transmission system uses a bogie mounted traction motor (one per axle) connected to the wheelset via a hollow shaft drive and flexible coupling, traction forces are tranmissed by low-lying rods connected to the bogie frame. Mechanical braking is by pneumatically operated disc brakes on each axle. The external design takes into account the minimisation of pressure pulses when passing other trains.

The electrical system differs from the SNCF BB 36000 Astride locomotives: current collection is via one of two pantographs, one used for AC electrification supply, the other for DC supply. Under 25 kV AC the supply voltage is stepped down by a transformer with four 1375 kW 1520 V secondary windings for traction; the traction supply is actively rectified using a pulse chopper circuit. Under 3 kV DC electrification the supply voltage is regulated by a chopper to 2200 V, producing the same intermediate DC supply voltage as when under 25 kV AC electrification. The intermediate DC link powers four individual three phase GTO-based, heat pipe cooled inverters (one per traction motor); the traction motors are force cooled four pole, three phase asynchronous machines (4FXA4-559B) rated at 1280 kW. The electrical system allows regenerative braking, except under 1.5 kV DC electrification, under which the locomotives operate at reduced power.

An additional transformer winding supplies 600-800 kW at 1520 V for head end power (heating), there are also 150 kW, 380 V, 50 Hz and 15 kW, 110 V DC auxiliary supplies.

The locomotives were designed to work in multiple, and in push-pull mode. Safety systems relevant to the countries of operation were fitted.

=== Introduction and operations ===
Initial introduction (1998-9) revealed a number of problems relating to electromagnetic interference with signalling and track circuits on introduction of the trains. High levels of electromagnetic noise due to resonance when operating near SNCF BB 15000 or DB Class 181 locomotives in Luxembourg initially caused restriction to single unit working. In Belgium the locomotives were unable to be operated on DC supply due to high levels of 50 Hz harmonics. In France high noise current levels were observed.

By June 2000 the locomotive were able to operate in push-pull mode with I11 coaches, beginning operation on the InterCity G (Ostend-Antwerp) service, and by June 2001 were also operating InterCity A services, sleeper services (TAA) between Brussels and Luxembourg, as well as freight trains between Liege and Luxembourg.

NMBS/SNCB's order was completed by October 2001.

In December 2002 locomotives of the class began to operate commercial services at their top speed of 200 km/h on InterCity A trains Leuven and Liege. Other ones started to replace other engines on freight trains; they were staple power on the newly-electrified Athus-Meuse line, electrified in 25 Kv AC.

The NMBS/SNCB M6 double decker coaches were also used with the class 13; in some cases the trains used two control cars, with a class 13 locomotive in the middle, a train formation nicknamed dromadaire (camel).

Currently, the freight engines belong to Lineas while a handful of Class 13 are used on IC trains between Brussels and Luxembourg.

== See also ==
- Belgian Railways Class 18 (Siemens), Siemens' locomotives of type 'Eurosprinter' ordered in 2006 to supplement Class 13 units, and allow them to be used on passenger services.
