= KTM Class 22 =

Class of English Electric diesel electric locomotives

Keretapi Tanah Melayu class 22
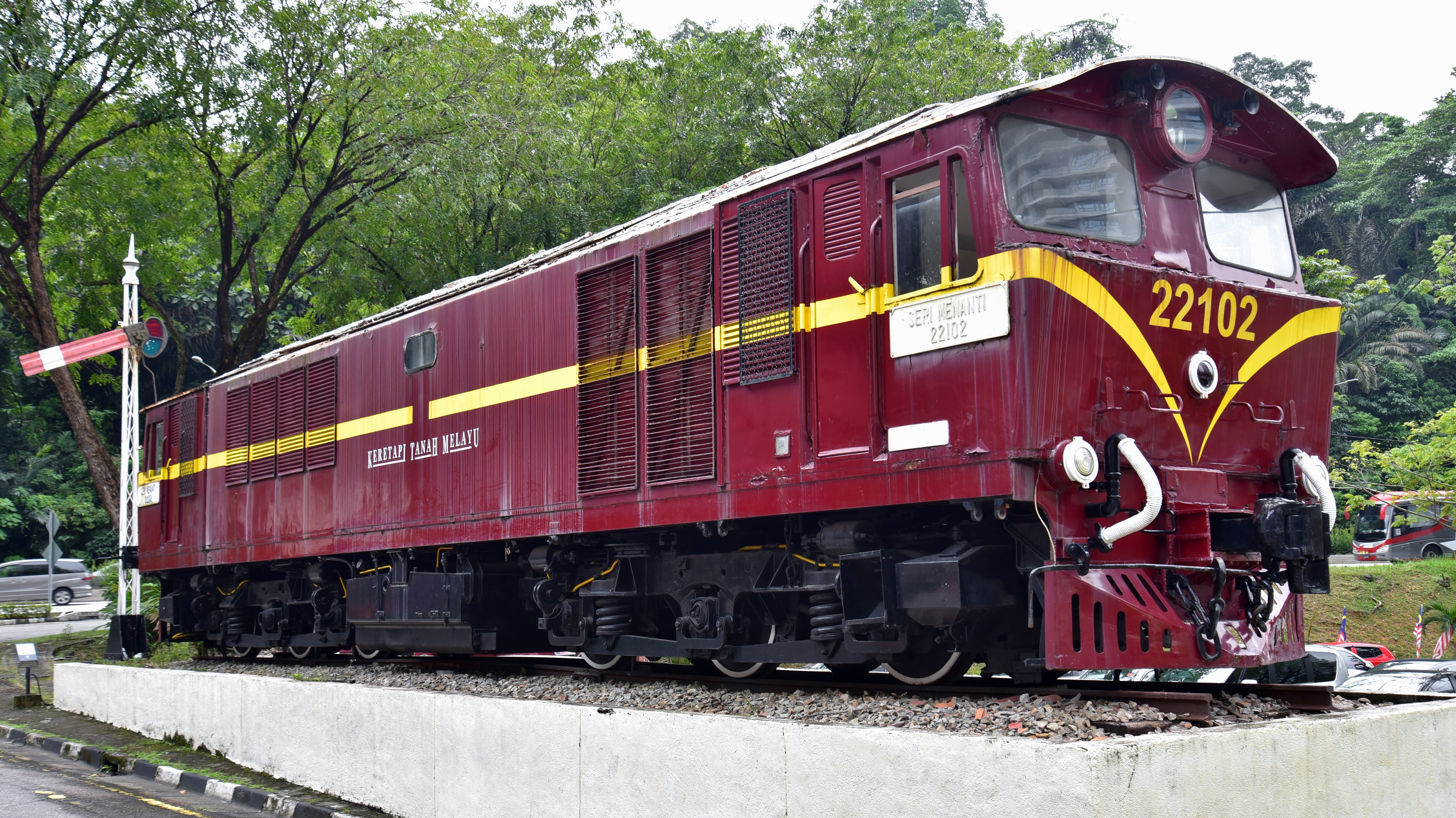
- Preserved locomotive 22102 in August 2023
Type and origin
- Power type: Diesel-electric
- Builder: English Electric-AEI Traction in association with Metro-Cammell
- Build date: 1971
- Total produced: 40
Specifications
- Configuration
  - Commonwealth: Co-Co
- Gauge: 1,000 mm (3 ft 3 3/8 in)
- Bogies: English Electric bolsterless low weight transfer
- Wheel diameter: 3 ft 2 in (0.965 m)
- Wheelbase: 11 ft 8 in (3.556 m) bogie
- Length: 48 ft (14.630 m) over headstocks
- Width: 9 ft 0 1/2 in (2.756 m)
- Height: 12 ft 7 in (3.835 m)
- Axle load: 14 long tons (14.2 t; 15.7 short tons)
- Loco weight: 82 1/2 long tons (83.8 t; 92.4 short tons)
- Fuel type: Diesel
- Fuel capacity: 800 imp gal (3,600 L)
- Sandbox cap.: 560 lb (250 kg)
- Prime mover: English Electric 8CSVT Mk III
- RPM
  - RPM idle: 450 rpm
  - Maximum RPM: 900 rpm
- Engine type: four stroke, four valves per cylinder
- Aspiration: turbocharged, intercooled
- Generator: EE822/16J
- Traction motors: AEI-253
- Cylinders: 8 Vee
- Cylinder size: 10 in × 12 in (254 mm × 305 mm)
- MU working: not fitted
- Loco brake: Air, proportional control, dynamic
- Train brakes: Vacuum
Performance figures
- Maximum speed: 60 miles per hour (97 km/h)
- Power output: 1,710 hp (1,280 kW) gross, 1,500 hp (1,120 kW) net
- Tractive effort
  - Starting: 58,300 lbf (259.3 kN)
  - Continuous: 40,300 lbf (179.3 kN) at 12 miles per hour (19 km/h)
Career
- Operators: Keretapi Tanah Melayu
- Number in class: 40
- Numbers: 22101 - 22140
- First run: 1971

The KTM Class 22 is a class of mainline diesel electric locomotives designed and equipped by English Electric-AEI Traction, with construction by Metro-Cammell, for operations by Keretapi Tanah Melayu in Malaysia.

== Design and history ==
The Class 22 is a dual cab general purpose locomotive with a full-width body. The body is a single stress-carrying truss structure designed for a buffing load of 300,000 lbf (1,334.5 kN). It consists of a basic underframe of rolled channel longitudinal side members connected by cross members at bogie, power unit and equipment mounting points, as well as at buffer beams and drag boxes. Sides consist of fabricated frames with steel panelling welded to the underframe. The prefabricated cabs are also welded to the underframe and sides to form the box structure. Detachable roof panels with hinged covers provide access to components for maintenance and overhaul.

The bogies were designed by English Electric. They are cast steel bolsterless with fully equalised primary suspension using helical coil springs on underslung beams and three-point secondary rubber cushion suspension to the body. To equalise motor reactions, the AEI-253 motors are all mounted on the inner side of each axle.

The engine is the 1,760 bhp V-8 version of English Electric's RK/V Mk III range, turbocharged and intercooled. It provides a 17% increase in power over the 12SVT Mk II engine fitted to the earlier Class 20. The EE822 DC generator is bolted directly to the engine. In February 1995, four (22105, 22107, 22119, 22140) were sent to Morrison Knudsen's factory in Whyalla, Australia for rebuilding. In April 2001, 22119 arrived at A Goninan & Co, Broadmeadow for rebuilding. It was scrapped in 2004.

After being withdrawn in 2010, four were retained and plinthed as exhibits, while three were sold for use by civil engineering contractors, one going to Bangladesh for use by civil engineering firm Maxx Railway Track after being refurbished by Nippon Kiara in Kuala Lumpur in 2014.
