= KTM Class 19 =

Class 19
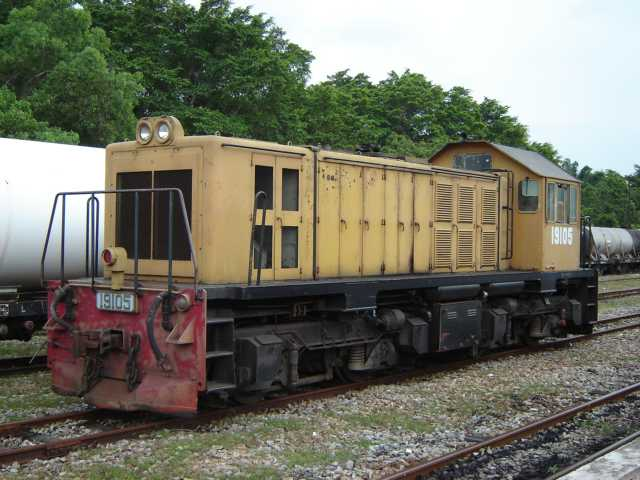
- KTMB Class 19 at Tapis Minyak station, Port Dickson, Negeri Sembilan, Malaysia.
Type and origin
- Power type: Diesel-electric
- Builder: Hitachi Rail
- Build date: 1983
- Total produced: 10
Specifications
- Configuration
  - UIC: Bo′Bo′
- Gauge: 1,000 mm (3 ft 3 3/8 in) metre gauge
- Length: 36 ft 9 in (11.20 m)
- Axle load: 14.33 tons
- Loco weight: 57.35 tons
- Engine type: MTU 6V 396 TC12 650hp @ 1800rpm
- Cylinders: 6
- Transmission: electric (DC-DC)
- Train brakes: Loco: air; train: vacuum and air
Performance figures
- Maximum speed: 70 km/h (43 mph)
- Tractive effort: 22,792 lbs @ 10 km/h, max - 30,500lbs
Career
- Numbers: 19101-19110
- Locale: Malaysia
- References: , unless where noted

The KTM Class 19 are a class of 10 Bo'Bo' shunting locomotives built by Hitachi in 1983 for Keretapi Tanah Melayu (Malayan Railway). The locomotives are based in major train stations as station pilots. As they are classed as shunters, they are limited to major train stations only and do not operate on the mainline.

== History ==
10 locomotives were acquired in 1983 and were assigned shunting duties around Malaysia. As of July 2025 all are in active service.
