= Dongbo 22-class barge =

Class of naval auxillery ship in the People's liberation Army Navy

Class overview
- Operators: People's Liberation Army Navy

General characteristics
- Class & type: Dongbo 22
- Electronic warfare & decoys: None
- Armament: Unarmed
- Aircraft carried: None
- Aviation facilities: None

The Dongbo 22 class barge is a class of little known naval auxiliary ship currently in service with the People's Liberation Army Navy (PLAN). The name of this class is after the first unit commissioned, with the exact type still remains unknown, and a total of three of this class have been confirmed in active service as of mid-2010s.

Dongbo 22 class series barges in PLAN service are designated by a combination of two Chinese characters followed by three-digit number. The second Chinese character is Bo (驳), short for Bo-Chuan (驳船), meaning barge in Chinese, because these ships are classified as barges. The first Chinese character denotes which fleet the ship is service with, with East (Dong, 东) for East Sea Fleet, North (Bei, 北) for North Sea Fleet, and South (Nan, 南) for South Sea Fleet. However, the pennant numbers may have changed due to the change of Chinese naval ships naming convention.

| Class | Pennant # | Status | Fleet |
|---|---|---|---|
| Dongbo 22 class | Dong-Bo 22 | Active | East Sea Fleet |
| Dongbo 22 class | Dong-Bo 23 | Active | East Sea Fleet |
| Dongbo 22 class | Dong-Bo 24 | Active | East Sea Fleet |
