= NSB Class 22 =

Class of Norwegian steam locomotives

NSB type 22
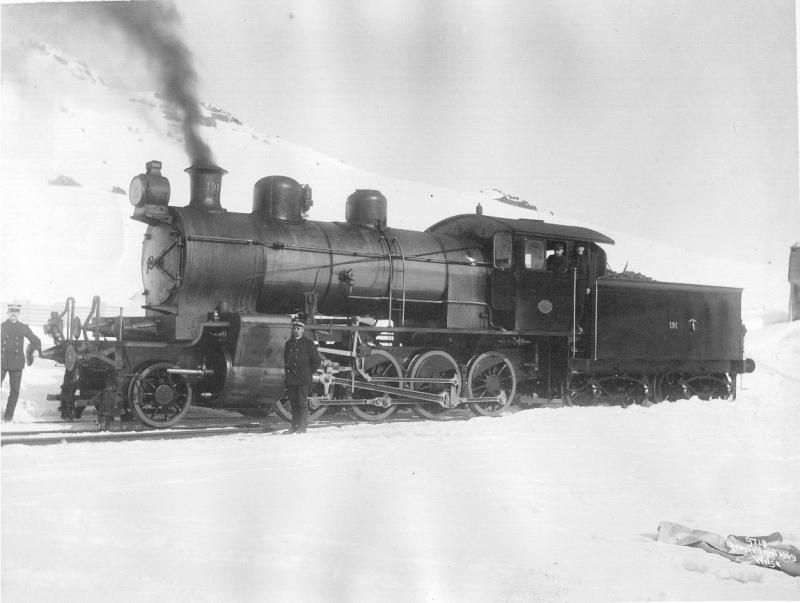
Type and origin
- Power type: Steam
- Builder: Hamar, Thune
- Build date: 1906–1908
- Total produced: 6
Specifications
- Configuration
  - Whyte: 2-8-0
  - UIC: 1'D
- Gauge: 4 ft 8 1/2 in (1,435 mm) standard gauge
- Wheelbase: 2825 mm (9ft 3.2in)
- Length: 16.385 mm (53 ft 8.8in)
- Loco weight: 22a: 49.6 t (54.7 short tons; 48.8 long tons); 22b: 51.2 t (56.4 short tons; 50.4 long tons)
- Tender weight: 16.6 t (18.3 short tons; 16.3 long tons)
- Total weight: 22a: 91 t (100 short tons; 90 long tons); 22b: 92.6 t (102.1 short tons; 91.1 long tons)
- Fuel type: Coal
- Fuel capacity: 4 t (4.4 short tons; 3.9 long tons)
- Water cap.: 15 m^{3} (3,300 imp gal)
- Firebox
  - Grate area: 2.13 m^{2} (22.9 sq ft)
- Boiler pressure: 13 kg/cm^{2} (180 psi)
- Heating surface
  - Firebox: 22a: 130.3 m^{2} (1,403 sq ft); 22b: 108.3 m^{2} (1,166 sq ft)
- Superheater
  - Heating area: 22b: 36.3 m^{2} (391 sq ft)
- Cylinders: 2
- Cylinder size: 22b: 570 mm × 640 mm (22 in × 25 in)
- High-pressure cylinder: 22a: 490 mm × 640 mm (19 in × 25 in)
- Low-pressure cylinder: 22a: 730 mm × 640 mm (29 in × 25 in)
Performance figures
- Maximum speed: Forward and Reverse; 22a: 40 km/h (25 mph) after 1925: 45 km/h (28 mph); 22b: 45 km/h (28 mph)
- Factor of adh.: 22a: 46.6 t (51.4 short tons; 45.9 long tons); 22b: 48 t (53 short tons; 47 long tons)
Career
- Operators: Norwegian State Railways
- Withdrawn: 1906–1958
- Preserved: None, All scrapped

The NSB Type 22 steam locomotives were built between 1906 and 1908 by Thunes mekaniske verksted and Hamar Jernstøberi for the Norges Statsbaner (NSB), the state railway company in Norway.

== History ==
The locomotives were intended for goods trains. Nos. 145 and 146 were built by Thunes in 1906. This was followed by the numbers 190 and 191 from the same manufacturer in 1908, and in the same year Hamar Jernstøberi delivered locomotives nos. 192 and 193.

The first two locomotives were first used on the Kristiania–Gjøvikbanen (KGB, Gjøvikbanen), although they were designed for use as a snowplough locomotive for the Bergen Railway. From 1908 they were used together with the snow blowers in winter on the Bergen Railway, which lasted until 1946. Then they were moved to Drammen to be used in the Oslo district on Valdresbanen, Gjøvikbanen, Randsfjordbanen and Krøderbanen for goods trains.

As a further development, the NSB Type 24 was then built.

=== NSB Type 22a ===
The locomotives were delivered as saturated compound steam locomotives and class was designated NSB type 22a.

=== NSB Type 22b ===
Over the years of operation, the six existing locomotives were rebuilt with superheaters. With the rebuilding, the series designation changed to 22b. However, this conversion dragged on for 18 years. After the first locomotive, the 191 in June 1930, it took eight years until the next, no. 193, was fitted with a superheater in October 1938. The rest followed: no. 192 in June 1941, no. 144 in February 1942, no. 145 in May 1942 and no. 190 in September 1948.

NSB Type 22c

Another conversion, in which the heating area was to be increased from 108.3 m^{2} to 116.3 m^{2} and the superheater area from 36.3 m^{2} to 55.6 m^{2}, was already intended for this variant. The series designation NSB 22c was already intended for this variant.

== Disposal ==
The locomotives were stored and scrapped between 1956 and 1958, the last being 22b no. 191 on October 28, 1958.
