= NMBS/SNCB M7 railcar =

Class of bilevel passenger car

M7 bilevel car
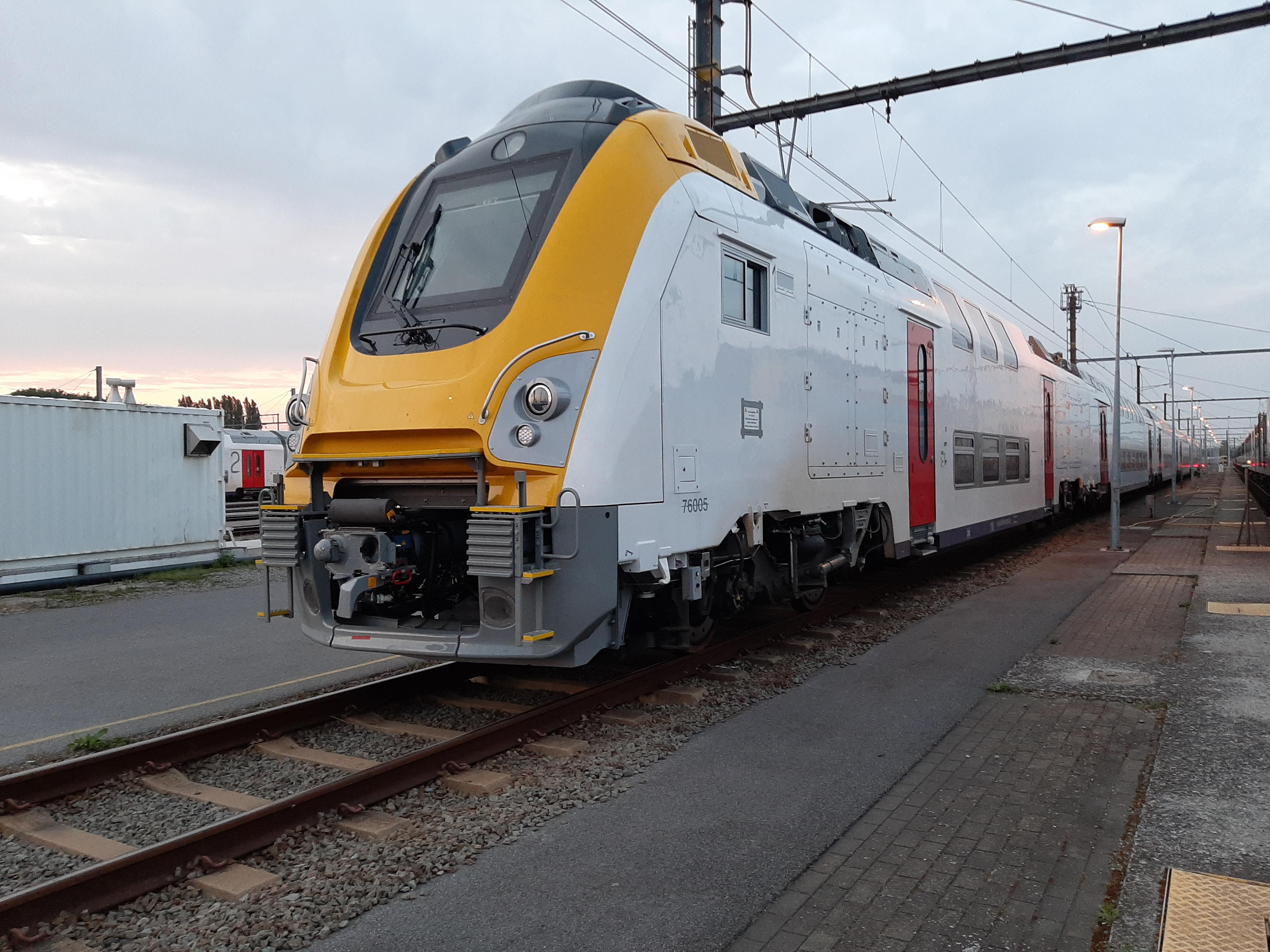
- Manufacturer: Bombardier/Alstom
- Assembly: Valenciennes, Bruges
- Constructed: 2018–
- Number built: 747 (145×AB, 145×B, 130×BD, 65×BDx, 90×Bmx)
- Predecessor: M6
- Operator: SNCB/NMBS

Specifications
- Platform height: 760 mm
- Maximum speed: 200 km/h (125 mph)
- Track gauge: 1,435 mm (4 ft 8 1/2 in)

The M7 cars are a series of bilevel rail cars of the National Railway Company of Belgium (NMBS/SNCB). Developed from the M6 cars, they were built by Bombardier Transportation and Alstom. The first car was delivered in September 2018. The M7 coaches are mainly intended as intercity stock, they will completely replace the M4 and partly replace the M5. Different types of M7 cars can be coupled to form loco-hauled or self-propelled trains similar to the German Twindexx Vario.

== History ==
On 18 December 2015 the SNCB, Bombardier Transportation and Alstom concluded a contract to deliver up to 1362 bilevel rail cars of a new design. At the same time 445 cars were ordered obligatorily. The 65 motorized cars of this order are manufactured in Valenciennes by Alstom. Bombardier produces all the other cars in Bruges. The M7 cars shall be used in Belgium, the Netherlands and Luxembourg.

Further orders were made in 2020 for 204 and in 2021 for 98 cars. By 2023, 1.049 carriages had been ordered.

== Design ==
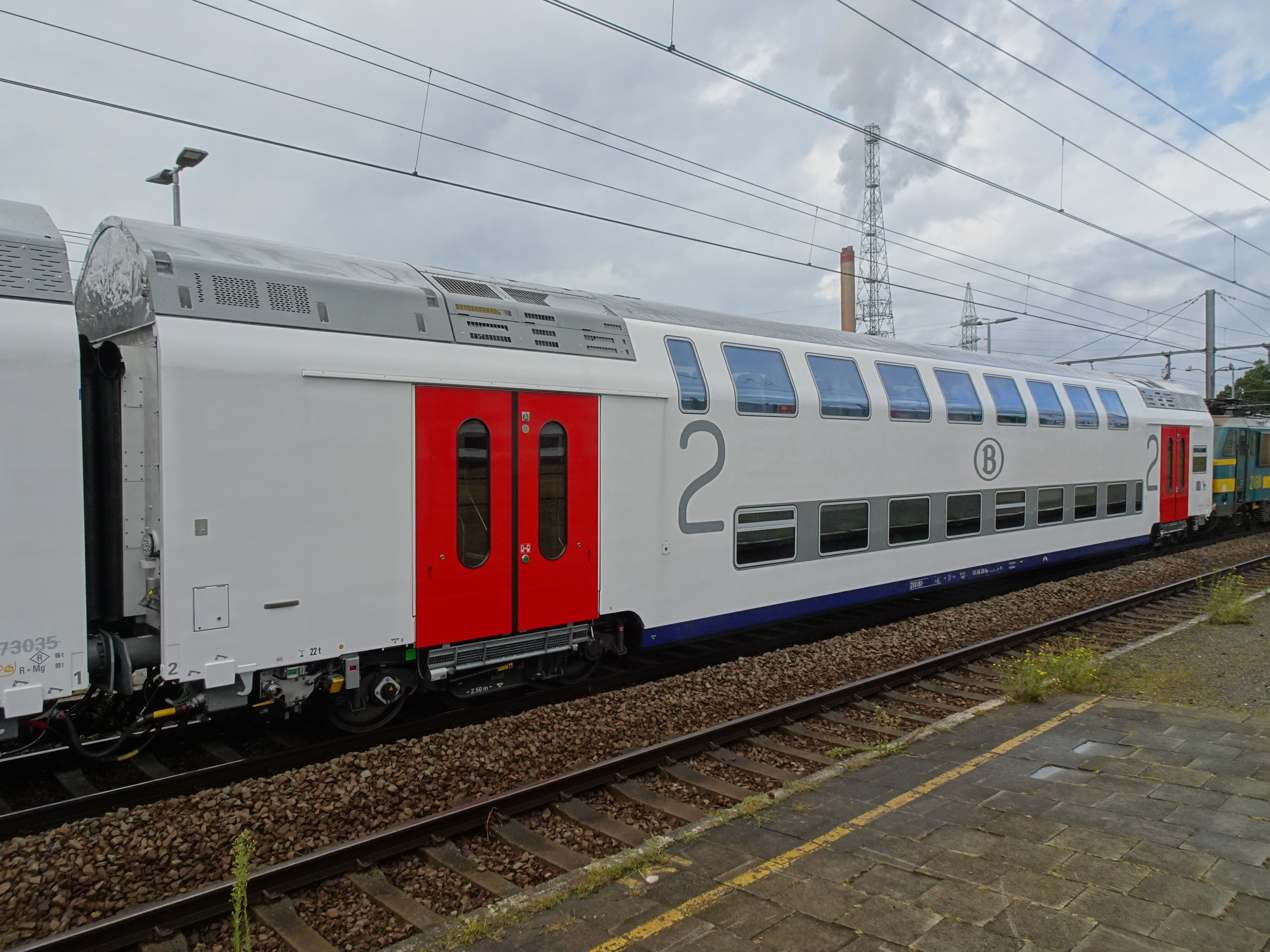
M7B middle car

Six different types of the M7 car are produced:

- AB are middle cars with first and second class.
- B are middle cars with exclusively second class.
- BDx are control cars with multi-function area and space for disabled people, with an entry height at 63 cm
- BD are cars with multi-function area and space for disabled people, with an entry height at 76 cm
- Bx are control cars with space for disabled people, with an entry height at 76 cm
- Bmx are motorized end cars.

The concept of the M7 cars contains either trains formed of several middle cars and one or two Bmx motorized railcars or push–pull trains with conventional locomotives. These trains shall be capable to use the older M6 rolling stock.

The M7 cars feature air conditioning and a closed toilet system. Information screens are placed next to the interior doors showing travel information. Compared to the M6 coaches more comfortable seats, information screens, higher ceilings, more legroom with opposite seats, space for large luggage and more power sockets. Initially, a WiFi connection as an option but this was later deemed too expensive. The first class is on the top floor of some carriages. M7 coaches can be easily coupled with M6 coaches and will also be able to run in the Netherlands and the Grand Duchy of Luxembourg, as well as on the Belgian high-speed lines.

The trains have a boarding height of 0.63 m, while the most common platform heights in Belgium are 0.55 m and 0.76 m. This makes it difficult for people with reduced mobility to get in and out on a self-employed basis. This also makes it more difficult to get in and out with luggage because of the difference in height between the train and the platform. An additional order in December 2020 included 130 autonomously accessible carriages with an entry height of 76 cm for people with reduced mobility. A year later, in December 2021, another 98 carriages were ordered

All cars are adapted to the Belgian standard Railway platform height of 760 mm.

=== Deployment ===
The very first deployment of the M7 coaches took place on January 13, 2020 to February 26, 2020, when some M7 coaches rode on the P train 7401 and 8400 from Liège-Guillemins to Brussels-South. In the meantime, these trains are running again entirely with M4 carriages. M7 carriages are used in P trains between Visé and Brussels-South along with I11 carriages. Since January 2021, the M7 carriages have been used on all trains of the IC-01 connection between Ostend and Eupen. On August 23, 2021, the first homogeneous line of M7 carriages from Schaerbeek in the direction of Gent-Sint-Pieters ran insured as peak hour train 8014 and that in both directions.

From the 2021-2024 period, this train will replace the outdated M4 trains of the NMBS.
