= Belgian Railways Class 23 =

Class 23
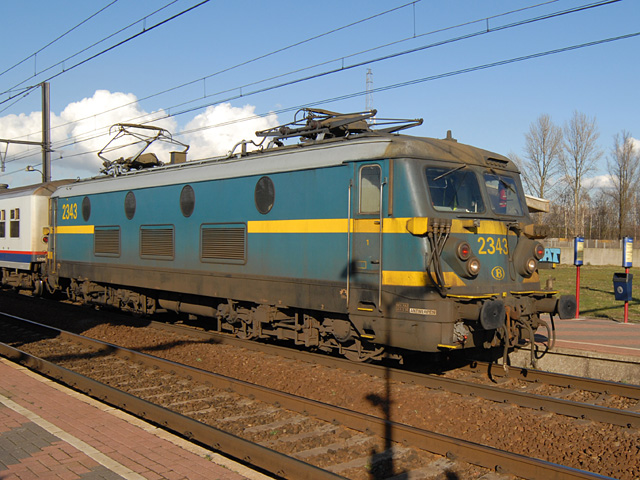
- NMBS/SNCB Class 23 loco 2343 at Antwerpen-Noorderdokken
Type and origin
- Power type: Electric
- Builder: BN/SEMG/ACEC
- Build date: 1955-1957
- Total produced: 83
Specifications
- Configuration
  - UIC: Bo′Bo′
- Gauge: 1,435 mm (4 ft 8 1/2 in) standard gauge
- Driver dia.: 1,262 mm (49.7 in)
- Length: 18 m (59 ft 1 in)
- Adhesive weight: 11.5 t (11.32 long tons; 12.68 short tons)
- Loco weight: 92,000 kg (90.55 long tons; 101.41 short tons)
- Electric system/s: 3000 V DC
- Current pickup: Pantograph
Performance figures
- Maximum speed: 130 km/h (81 mph)
- Power output: 1,740 kW (2,333 hp) continuous 1,880 kW (2,521 hp) one hour
- Tractive effort: 196 kN (44,000 lbf)
Career
- Operators: SNCB/NMBS
- Class: 23
- Number in class: 83
- Numbers: 2301-2383
- Delivered: 1955-1957
- Disposition: 2383 preserved. Others scrapped.

Class 23 locomotives were part of the 1950s generation of SNCB electric locomotives that included Types 122 (later 22), 123 (later 23), 125, (later 25 and 25.5) and 140 (later 25 and 25.5) built between 1953 and 1961. There were 50 Series 122, 83 Series 123, 16 Series 125 and 6 Series 140 for a total of 155. They were seen across Belgium on passenger and freight trains until they were retired in 2012. Class 23 was later fitted for multiple working, and were often found in pairs. There was no difference in power between the classes as they all used the same traction motors and control equipment.

The 23s differed from the 22s in three ways. The most visible was the ventilation grilles. Those on the Type 122 were mounted on the roof and sometimes had problems with water ingestion. This was corrected by having three grilles mounted low on each side. Six of the 23s (2306-2313-2317-2320-2321-2331) later received an extra vent on one side only, just above the existing central one. The next was additional weight was added to the chassis to increase tractive effort. The third was the 23s had regenerative braking. The reason for these differences was to let them pull heavy freight trains on the line Brussels-Luxembourg.

Loco 123.083 became 124.001 in 1968 and 2401 in 1971. It received a streamlined shroud at one end only that fit over the existing bodywork. It had its own windshield, wipers, washers and headlights. It also was given the ACEC Type G transmission system with a different gear ratio to test. Another change was that the traction motors were completely suspended rather than being just nose suspended. This was all a development stage for what was to have been a four voltage electric loco of 7,000 hp (5,200 kW). As time went on the four voltage requirement was dropped and the actual production locomotive became the Class 20, introduced late in 1975. 124.001/2401 made a number of test runs between Landegem and Aalter at speeds up to 200 km/h (124 mph). It was converted back to standard and renumbered to 2383 during 1974. It ran in regular freight and passenger services and became "The Banker of Liège" when it became the normal loco for pushing passenger trains up the steep ramp leading from Liège-Guillemins up to Ans.

Loco 2302 was given ventilation grilles like those on Classes 11-12-21-27 as a test. These were mounted high on each side. The original openings were blanked in and each fitted with a porthole. No other Class 23s ever had these. 2302 retained this arrangement until the end of its service life.

The arrival of the new Class 18 locomotives in early 2012 marked the end of the class, during the spring of 2012 all were withdrawn except a few for banking duties at Liège-Guillemins but even those were soon withdrawn, replaced by Class 77 diesels.

Before 1 January 1971 the locomotives were numbered 123.001-123.083 but from this date the class became 2301-2382. See the above history of 123.083 for detailed information on this loco.

2383 (ex 2401, 124.001, 123.083) is preserved by the SNCB.
