= Belgian Railways Class 20 =

Class 20
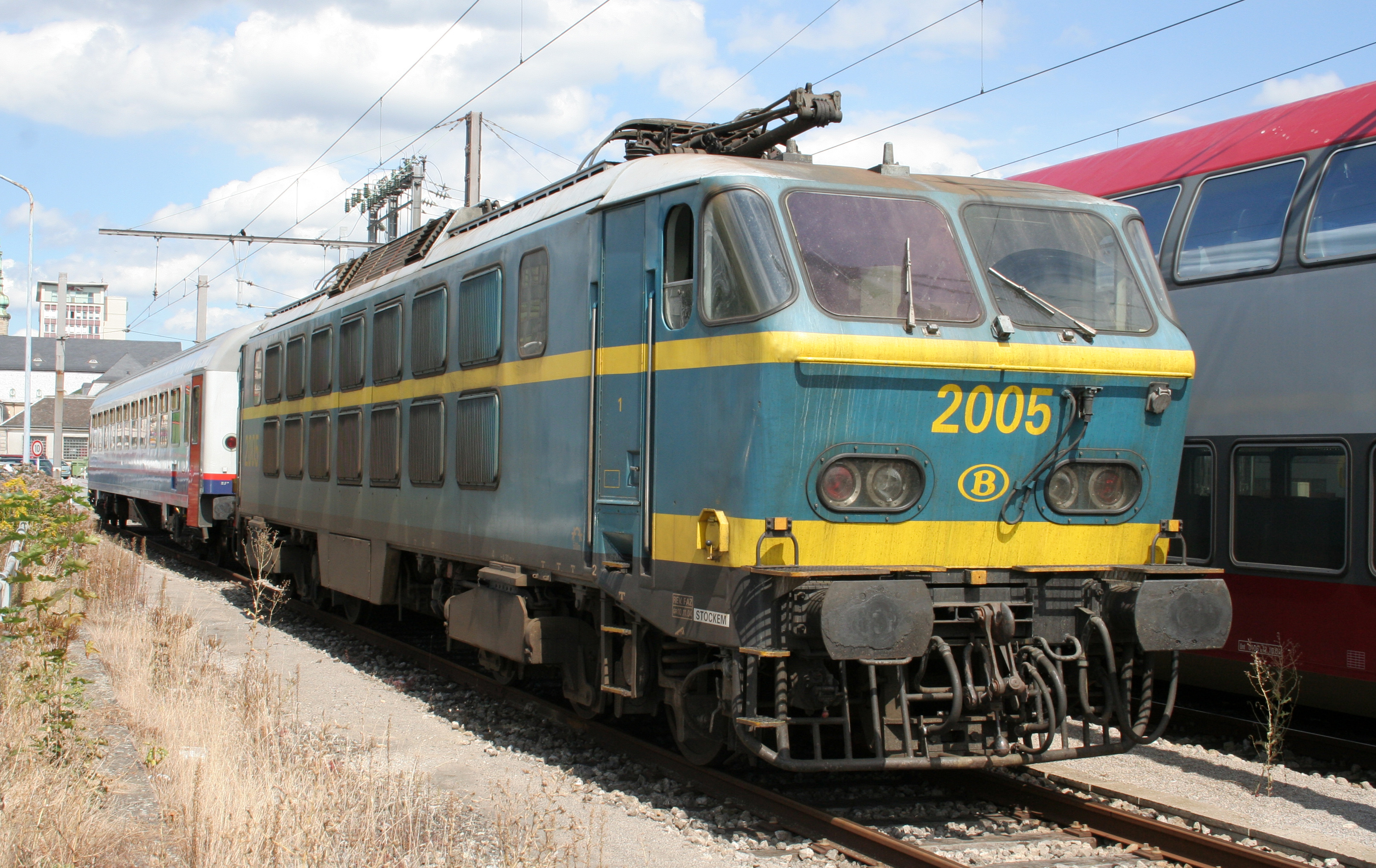
- 2005 stabled at Luxembourg, 2007-08-13.
Type and origin
- Power type: Electric
- Builder: BN/ACEC
- Build date: 1975–1977
- Total produced: 25
Specifications
- Configuration
  - UIC: Co′Co′
- Gauge: 1,435 mm (4 ft 8 1/2 in) standard gauge
- Driver dia.: 1,250 mm (49.2 in)
- Length: 19.5 m (64 ft 0 in)
- Loco weight: 110 t (110 long tons; 120 short tons)
- Electric system/s: 3000 V DC
- Current pickup(s): Pantograph
Performance figures
- Maximum speed: 160 km/h (99 mph)
- Power output: 5,150 kW (6,910 hp) Continuous, 5,400 kW (7,200 hp) One Hour
- Tractive effort: 314 kN (71,000 lbf)
Career
- Operators: SNCB/NMBS
- Class: 20
- Number in class: 25
- Numbers: 2001–2025
- Nicknames: Queen of the Rails
- Delivered: 1975-1978
- First run: September 1975
- Last run: December 2013
- Retired: 31 December 2013
- Current owner: SNCB
- Disposition: 2020 scrapped after collision in 1991, 2012 scrapped in 2013. The rest were scrapped by the end of 2015.

Class 20 is a class of electric locomotives formerly operated by SNCB, the national railway of Belgium.

Prior to the introduction of the Class 13, Class 20 was the most powerful NMBS/SNCB electric locomotive class in Belgium, a distinction it held for 30 years. They commonly worked on Brussels - Luxembourg services, later sharing passenger duties with the CFL Class 3000s. Unusually for SNCB they are Co-Co locomotives.

== Development ==
The SNCB Class 20 was based on plans for a 7,000-horsepower (5,200 kW) four system electric locomotive drawn up by SNCB in 1968. The four system requirement was later dropped and 15 of these locomotives, equipped to run only on 3000 volts DC, were ordered from BN in 1973. Production started in 1975 and an order for 10 more was placed with BN soon after the first one was delivered. Production ended in 1978.

There were no prototypes built and given that this locomotive was on the cutting edge of technology in its day, that turned out to be a mistake. After a short time they started having problems and failures in service and it took SNCB over five years to sort them all out. The first problem area was the ACEC Type G transmission. They all had to be rebuilt with stronger gears and that fix solved the problem. Oddly enough, the Type G transmission was the only part of the Class 20 that had been fully tested before entering service. The reason it caused problems in service was that it was tested on locomotive 124.001/2401/2383 (all the same one) which had four much less powerful traction motors compared to the six much larger motors of the Class 20. The other major problem was the thyristor control system for the traction motors. Some major modifications were made over time and reliability greatly improved. Even after these changes they had to be driven gently for the rest of their service lives. They could still run at their top speed of 160 km/h (99 mph) but maximum acceleration was forbidden.

The SNCB Class 20 had three 'firsts' to its credit. It was the first pure direct current locomotive in the world to make 7,000 hp (5,200 kW) or anything close. It was also the first and only locomotive to use the ACEC Type G transmission. Finally, it was the first pure DC electric locomotive in the world to have thyristor control. Although the Class 20 had no predecessor it became the prototype for classes 11, 12, 21 and 27 which were much more reliable from the start based on what was learned from the Class 20's problems. Although it was not a technological first, the Class 20 was also the SNCB's first (and so far only) all service electric locomotive with a Co-Co wheel arrangement, a feature that helped it to pull heavy freight trains easily through the Ardennes in spite of its 160 km/h (99 mph) gearing.

== Service ==
The first 23 Class 20's were painted dark green with silver lining. 2024 and 2025 were both the first and the last new SNCB locos that left the factory in yellow with blue bands for better visibility. All were repainted into blue with yellow stripes when they received their first major overhauls starting around 1990. All yellow electric locomotives in classes 15, 16, 20, 22, 23, 25 and 26 were repainted blue when it was found out the yellow ones showed dirt and grime much better than darker colors. It seems the SNCB forgot this lesson when it ordered AM 96 and later rolling stock which was painted in white. Loco 2005 was repainted from blue back to green to run in the last two farewell trips for the class in 2014. The first farewell trip was pulled by 2024 in blue in May 2013.

SNCB had to renumber a series of three older locomotives which were given the same class number when the four digit numbering system started in 1971. When the first order for these Class 20 locomotives was placed, the three Baume et Marpent locomotives from 1949; 2001, 2002 and 2003 quickly became 2801, 2802 and 2803 in anticipation of the first locomotives of this, the second, Class 20.

Class 20 was intensively used in both freight and passenger service. Typical duties included international passenger trains from Brussels to Luxembourg with the trains continuing to Switzerland and Italy with French locomotives to Basel in Switzerland, Swiss locomotives in Switzerland and Italian locomotives to the final destination in Italy. Freight duties included heavy trains from the port of Antwerp to places like the yards at Stockkem, Montzen, Gent and Zeebrugge. Class 20 locomotives were seen with all types of SNCB hauled coaching stock over their time in service starting with Types K, M2 and M4. Later on they hauled double deck M5 and M6 coaches on peak hour trains, mostly between Brussels-Midi and Jemelle. Until Class 13 arrived they were the only SNCB locos that could pull 1100 ton freight trains on the difficult line from Luxembourg to Brussels. Class 20 was not equipped to run in multiple. Multiple working with the class was tried with a driver in each locomotive (a system of light signals was used to inform the driver of the second locomotive of what was going on) soon after introduction but the practice was quickly banned because the current demand of the pair caused problems for the electrical substations which were then in use.

== End of Service ==
Commercial service for Class 20 came to an end when locomotive 2003 pulled a Euro City passenger train from Luxembourg City to Brussels-Midi on the evening of 31 December 2013. Only a handful were still in service at that time. The others were withdrawn upon reaching the necessary kilometers for their next overhaul or after various failures.

== Preservation ==
Three different Class 20's have been preserved. 2001 has been preserved by the SNCB. 2005 in the original green color will be kept on the active list at least until the end of 2016 and 2021 was saved by the railway preservation group PFT-TSP.

== Modeling ==
Over the years the Austrian firm of Roco has made a series of models in HO scale of different Class 20's. Roco has so far managed to make models of 16 different locomotives as follows: 2002 G*, 2005 B*, 2006 B*, 2007- B, 2008- B, 2009- B, 2010 B*, 2016 (twice, both B -/*), 2017 G-, 2018 (twice, both B- and G*), 2019 G-, 2020 G-, 2021 B-, 2023 G-, 2024 Y* and 2025 Y*. The last two were in yellow and the others split between green and blue. Models marked * are second generation models with different motors and other improvements. Models of 2024 and 2025 were produced by Rocky Rail for the Jocadis (now defunct) model train shop in the yellow and blue. These used the existing Roco model of 2018 in blue. Some had correctly colored blue numbers on their cab ends but most had black ones like Class 21 locomotives. 2006 and both versions of 2016 had a yellow trapezoid on the cab ends. 2007 and 2009 had the front lights at both ends circled in yellow. 2008 was only sold as part of a set that included one each of Eurofima orange I6A and I6B coaches and an I6Bc couchette sleeper. All of the special features on these models were also on the real locomotives. Roco still has not made models of 2001-2003-2004-2011-2012-2013-2014-2015 in any color (Correction: '2001' was made in a limited series for the (since then closed) modelling shop Hobby-Verborgh in Ghent, in uniform green livery, before jan.2014)

A limited edition of expensive hand-crafted metal models of the Class 20 was built by Math Models in Belgium of a few different numbers.
