= Belgian Railways Class 22 =

Class 22
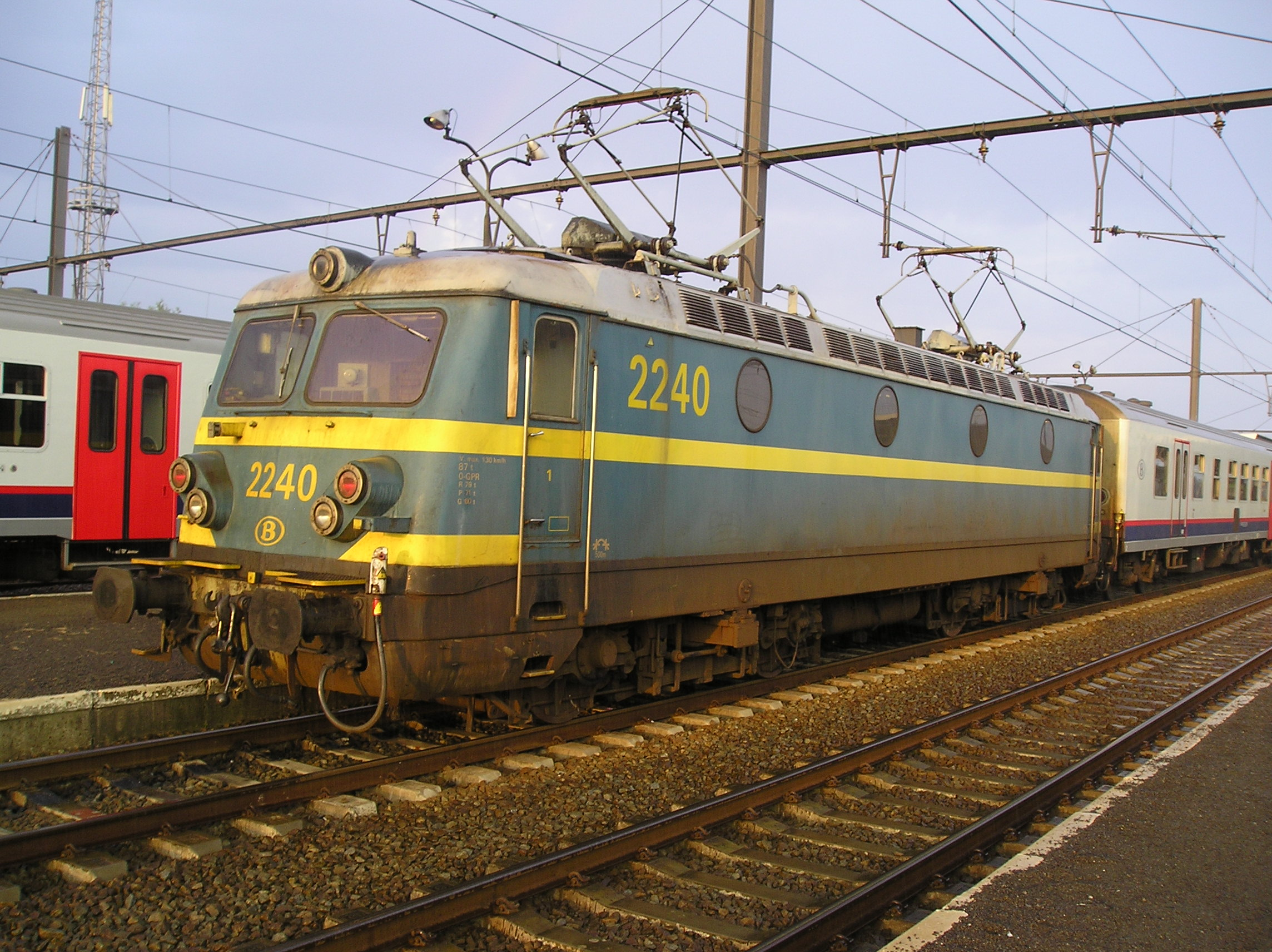
- NMBS/SNCB Class 22 loco 2240 in Dendermonde station 19 June 2006.
Type and origin
- Power type: Electric
- Builder: Niv/SEMG/ACEC
- Build date: 1953–1954
- Total produced: 50
Specifications
- Configuration
  - UIC: Bo′Bo′
- Gauge: 1,435 mm (4 ft 8 1/2 in) standard gauge
- Driver dia.: 1,262 mm (49.7 in)
- Length: 18 m (59 ft 1 in)
- Loco weight: 87 tonnes (86 long tons; 96 short tons)
- Electric system/s: 3000 V DC
- Current pickup(s): Pantograph
Performance figures
- Maximum speed: 130 km/h (81 mph)
- Power output: 1,740 kW (2,330 hp) Continuous, 1,880 kW (2,520 hp) One Hour
- Tractive effort: 196 kN (44,100 lbf)
Career
- Operators: SNCB/NMBS
- Class: 22
- Numbers: 2201–2250
- Delivered: 1953–1955
- Disposition: 2201 preserved, others scrapped.

SNCB Class 22 Locomotives were owned by the National Railway Company of Belgium, also known as Nationale Maatschappij der Belgische Spoorwegen (or NMBS, Dutch) or Société Nationale des Chemins de fer Belges (or SNCB, French), the Belgian national railway operator.

Class 22 locomotives were part of the 1950s generation of SNCB electric locomotives that included Types 122 (later 22), 123 (later 23), 125, (later 25 and 25.5) and 140 (later 125.100, 25 and 25.5) built between 1953 and 1961. There were 50 Series 122, 83 Series 123, 16 Series 125 and 6 Series 140 for a total of 155 locomotives. They were seen across Belgium on passenger and freight trains until they were retired. There was no difference in power between the classes as they all used the same electric motors and control equipment.

Class 22 was originally designated as Type 122 prior to introduction of the 1971 numbering system. The original numbers were 122.001-122.050. In 1957 the last 10 locos were given dual voltage (1500 and 3000 Volts DC) capability plus a third headlight so they could run on the NS. They were renumbered to 122.201-210. Later 122.039 and 122.040 were also converted and renumbered to 122.211 and 122.212. Loco 120.038 was given a third headlight and renumbered 122.210 and used as a display during the 1958 exposition in Brussels but did not work in service with this number. This subterfuge allowed all of the real 122.200s to remain in service for the extra traffic generated by the exposition. This also happened with one of the AFB-GM diesel locos at the same time. 202.011 was temporarily renumbered to 204.009 for the same reason.

2202 was later fitted with nonstandard ventilation grilles as a test. No others were converted.

The class was withdrawn in 2009, 56 years after its introduction with all but a few still in running condition. Their last working duties included peak hour trains and banking at Liège.

2201 is preserved by the PFT-TSP railway preservation group.
