= History of rail transport in Belgium =

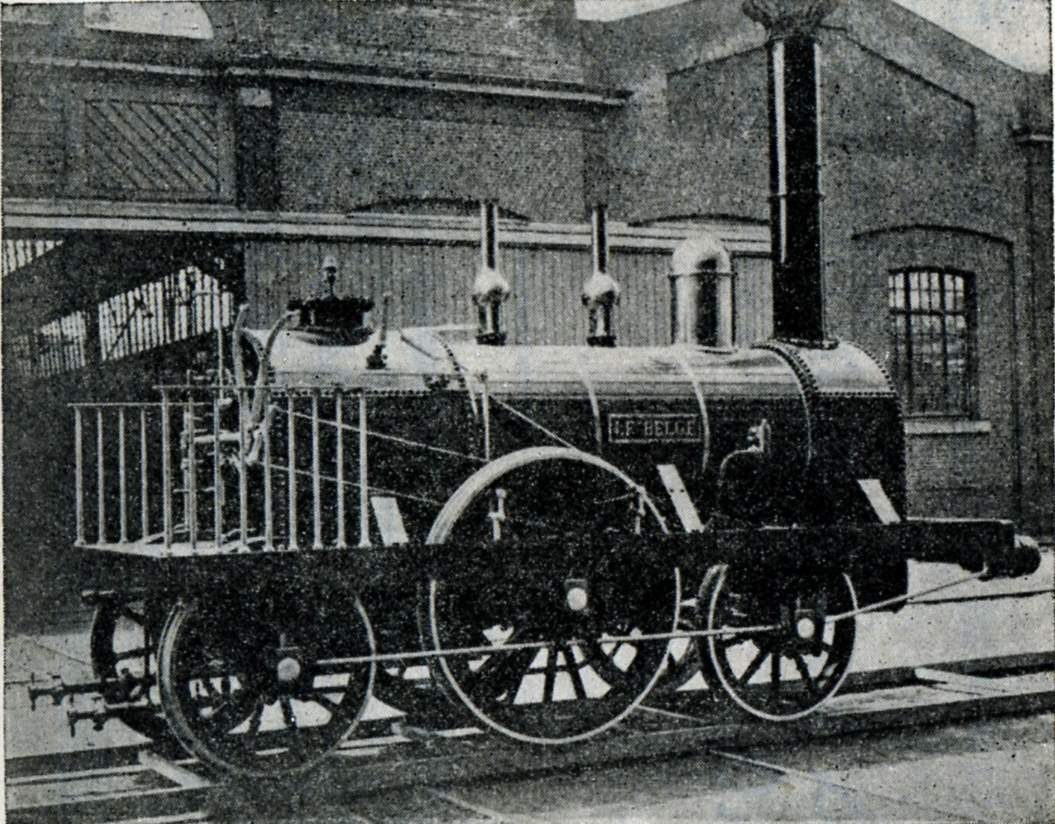
Le Belge ("The Belgian"; 1835) was the first steam locomotive built in continental Europe.

Belgium was heavily involved in the early development of railway transport. Belgium was the second country in Europe, after Great Britain, to open a railway and produce locomotives. The first line, between the cities of Brussels and Mechelen opened in 1835. Belgium was the first state in Europe to create a national railway network and the first to possess a nationalised railway system. The network expanded fast as Belgium industrialised, and by the early 20th century was increasingly under state-control. The nationalised railways, under the umbrella organisation National Railway Company of Belgium (NMBS/SNCB), retained their monopoly until liberalisation in the 2000s.

== Background ==
Attempts to build railways in Belgium significantly predated the establishment of the first line. In 1829, the British-Belgian industrialist John Cockerill tried to obtain a concession from the Dutch king William I to build a railway line from Brussels to Antwerp, without success.

During the Belgian Revolution of 1830-31, Belgium split from the Netherlands and emerged as an independent state. It became a key site of railway development in Continental Europe. A debate began around the desirability of establishing public railway lines using the steam locomotives recently developed in England. A proposal to build a railway between Antwerp and Cologne (in neighbouring Prussia) which would link the industrializing Ruhr and Meuse valleys with the ports of the Scheldt was considered by the Chamber of Representatives in 1831 but was eventually rejected.

In August 1831, however, the government launched a big scale survey under the supervision of Pierre Simons and Gustave de Ridder for potential sites for railways which, it was hoped, would help to regenerate the Belgian economy. Particularly in liberal circles, it was felt that railways would not serve a purely economic function, but were also necessary part of forging Belgian national identity.

== Rail networks and railways ==
=== First railways ===
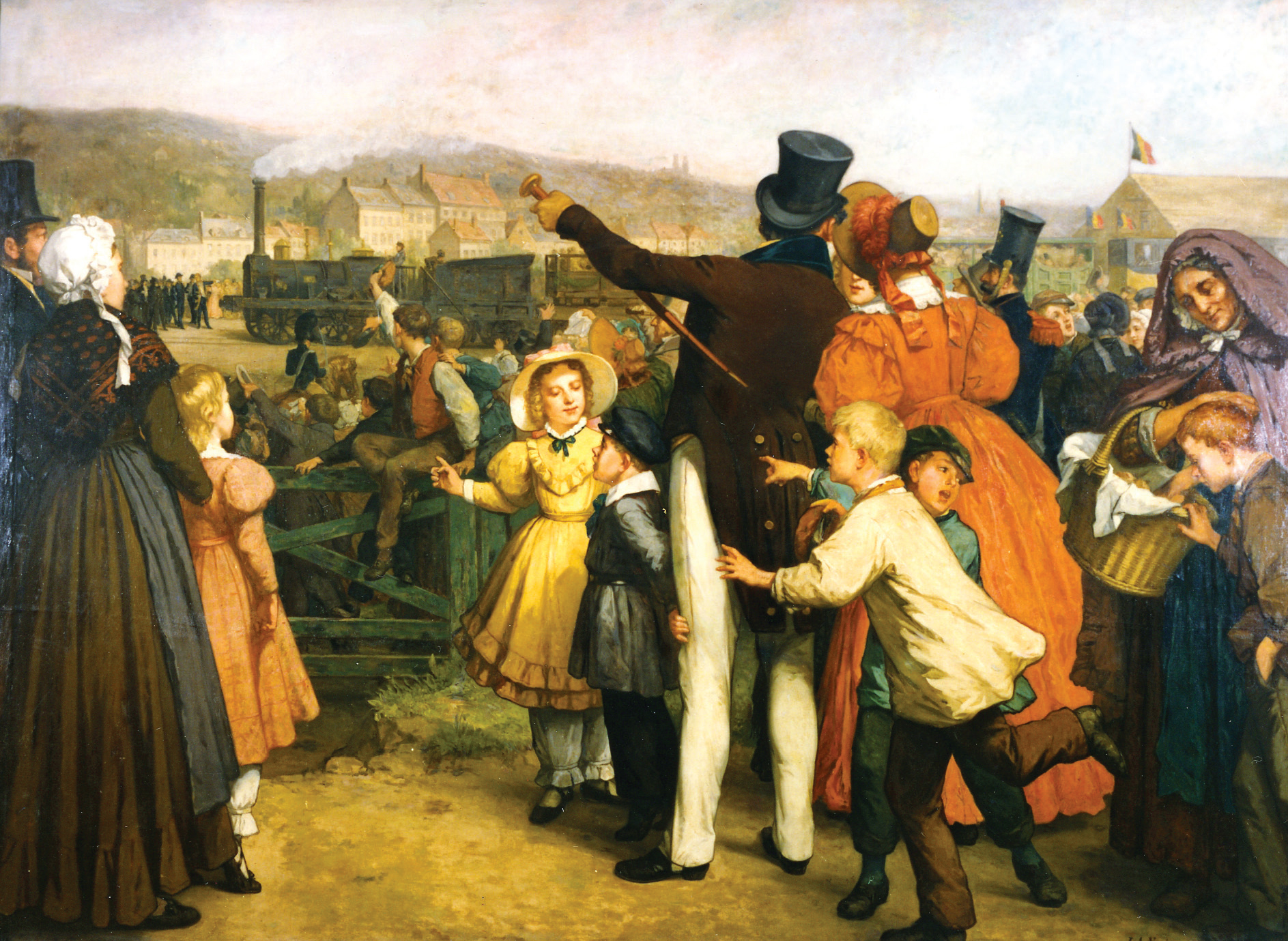
Opening of the Brussels–Mechelen railway on 5 May 1835

Unlike the United Kingdom, where early railways had been developed by the private sector, the state took the initiative in the development of railways in Belgium, partly out of the fear that large banks, like the Société Générale de Belgique could develop a monopoly in the industry. Considering that the railways would be a major economic resource and a full national network would be necessary, the Belgian government was unusual at the time for planning a national network in advance before any was built.

At first, only one line was studied (the line between Antwerp and the Prussian border). However, the project quickly evolved:

- Instead of a direct line, the Antwerp - Cologne line was rerouted through Mechelen (where a short stub line to Brussels could be built), Leuven, Liège and Verviers. This itinerary was longer and more complicated but it would be more profitable and generate more traffic;
- Another line, starting at Mechelen, would reach Dendermonde, Ghent, Bruges and Ostend, granting a safe access to the sea (since the Dutch were able to blockade the Scheldt, cutting Antwerp away from the sea);.
- A southbound line would link Brussels and Mons, an industrial town at the heart of the Sillon industriel, before crossing the French border (near Quiévrain), where a connecting line could reach Valenciennes, in northern France.

In 1834, the Belgian government approved a plan to build a railway between Mons, and the port of Antwerp via Brussels at a cost of 150 million Belgian francs. The first stretch of the Belgian railway network, between northern Brussels and Mechelen, was completed in 1835 and was the first steam passenger railway in continental Europe. The line between Liège and Ostend meant that the country had a full rail network planned nearly from the outset. By 1836, the line to Antwerp had been completed and by 1843 the two main lines (which formed a rough north-south/east-west cross) had been finished while two other mainlines (Ghent - Kortrijk - Mouscron - Tournai (with an international line linking Mouscron with Lille) - Braine-le-Comte (on the Brussels - Mons line) - Manage (near La Louvière) - Charleroi - Namur) were added to this network and completed by 1843. In 1843, each provincial capital (save Arlon and Hasselt) had a railway station.

Early Belgian railways were heavily influenced by British designs, and British technology and engineers were extremely important. The engineer George Stephenson travelled on the first train between Brussels-Mechelen in 1835, and his company provided the first three locomotives (based on the Rocket design) (Note: The three locomotives were named La Flèche ("Arrow"), L'Eléphant, and Stephenson, after their designer. The first Belgian-produced locomotives were used after 1835.) used on the line. The rapid expansion of the Belgian railways in the 1830s was one of the factors allowing Belgium to recover from an economic recession which it had experienced since the revolution and served as a major force in the Belgian Industrial Revolution.

=== Expansion ===
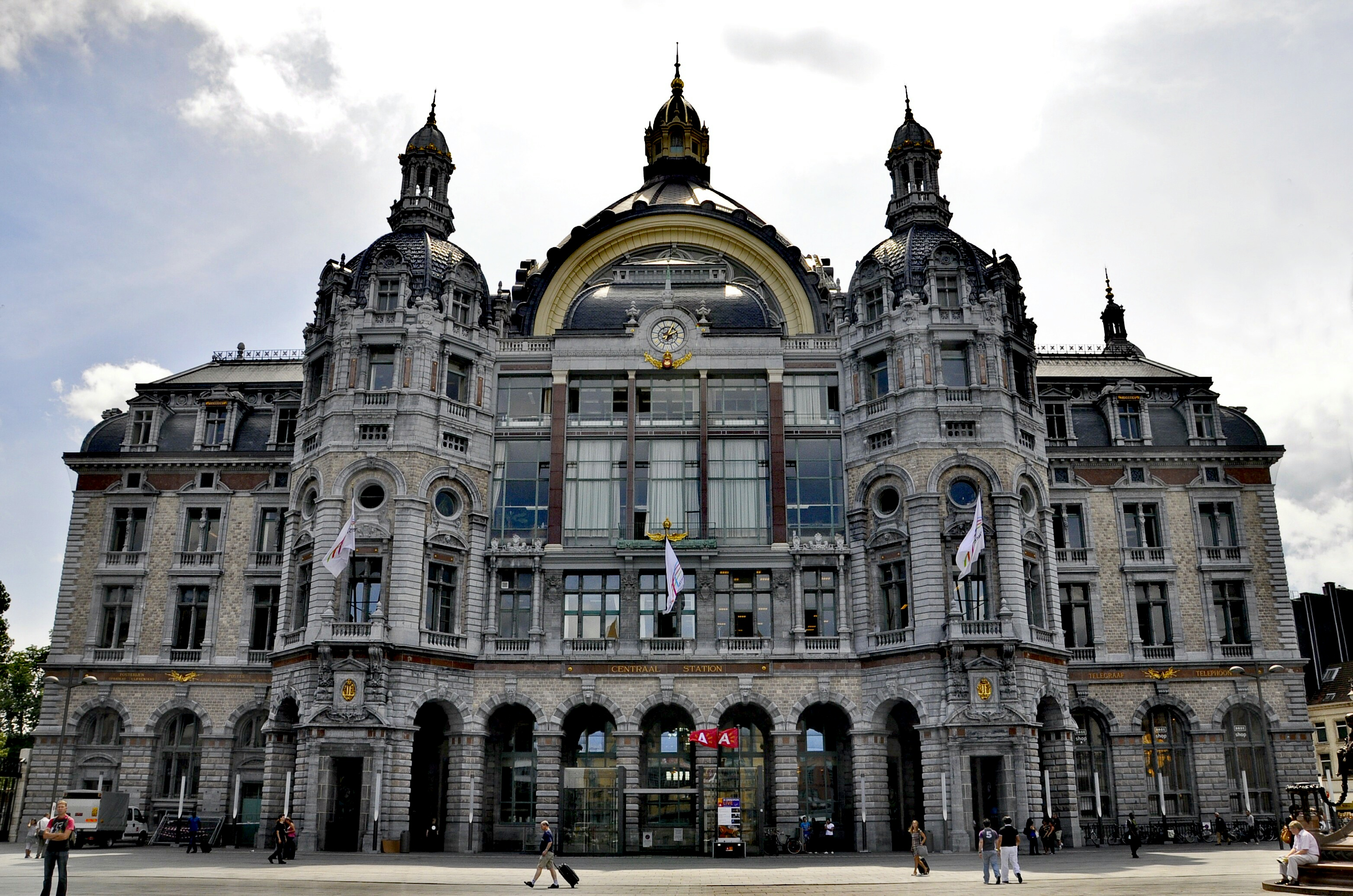
Antwerp-Central station, built between 1895 and 1905

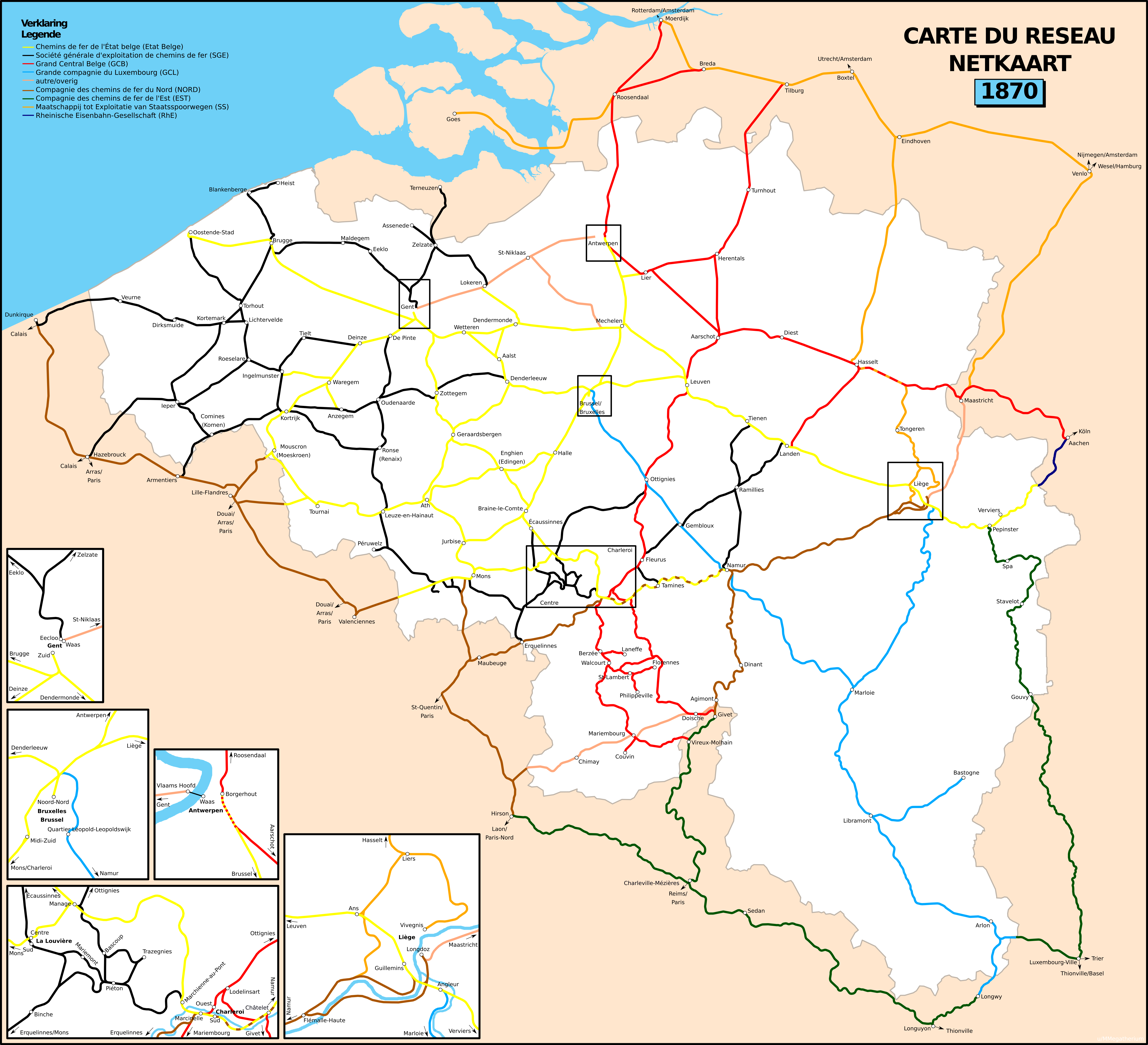
Map of the Belgian railway network in 1870

In France and Germany, private companies quickly built connections to the Belgian international lines, connecting the cities of Lille, Valenciennes (in France), Cologne and Aachen (in Prussia) to the Belgian network between 1842 and 1843.

Despite the fact that very few lines (47.7 km) were built by the Belgian State Railways between 1845 and 1870, subsequent development of the rail network was largely organized by the state rather than by private companies. Several lines were built by private companies, notably the Namur to Liège line built in 1851, on a ninety-year lease which would return them to the government after the period has lapsed. Many of the mainlines were operated by the Belgian State Railways. Within ten years of its first railway, Belgium had more than 560 kilometres (350 mi) of railway lines, 80 stations, 143 locomotives and 25,000 pieces of rolling stock. Belgium's first telegraph line was installed in 1846 along the Brussels-Antwerp railway. Unlike canals, which made internal trade much easier than international, the railways also pushed Belgian companies to export their goods abroad. The success of the railways both intensified Belgian industrialisation and consolidated Antwerp's position as one of Europe's pre-eminent ports.

=== Private and nationalised ownership ===
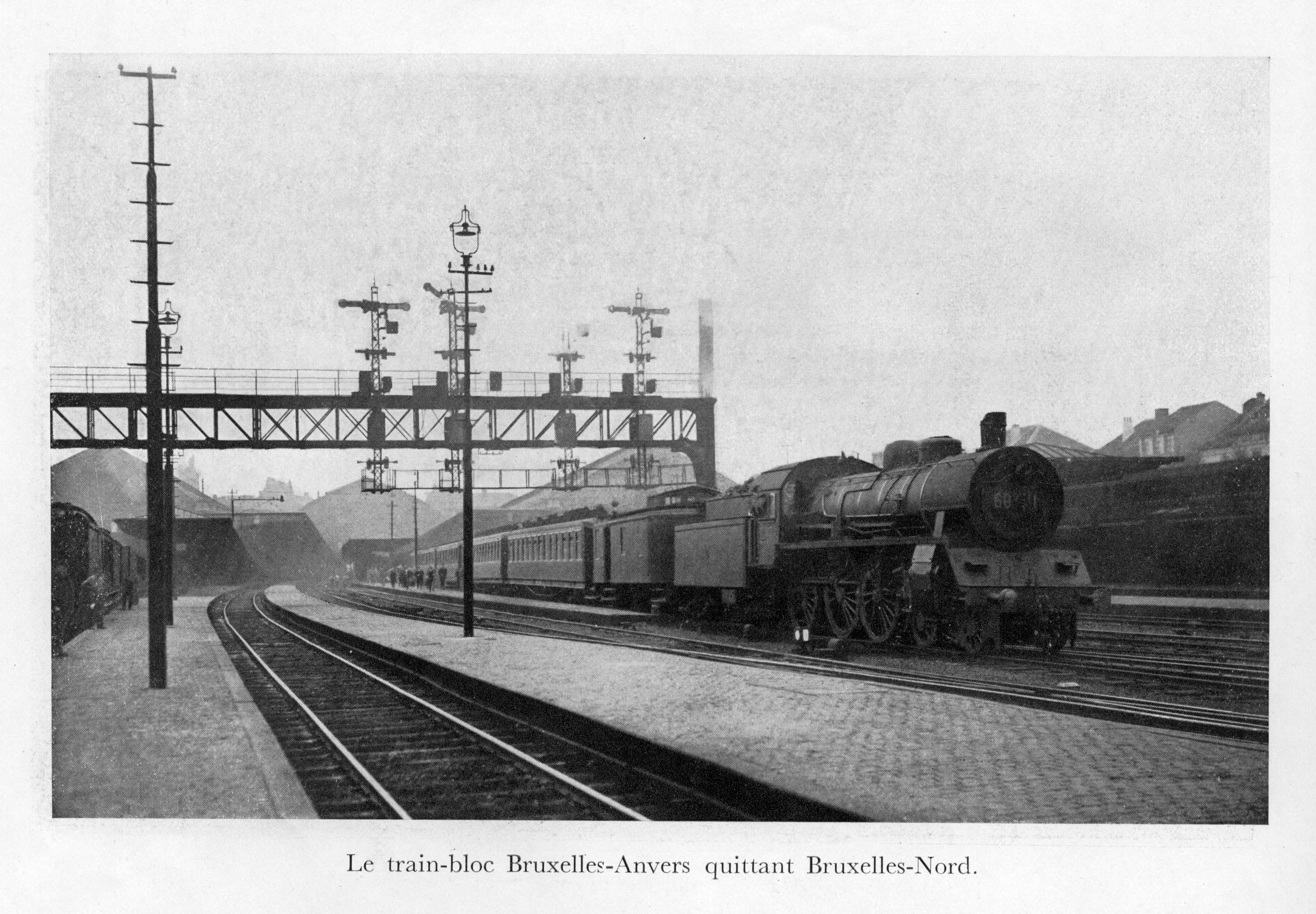
A train to Antwerp leaving Brussels-North station in the 1920s

The Belgian government resisted attempts by foreign companies to buy up railway assets in Belgium. In the winter of 1868, against a background of French threats to Belgium and Luxembourg under the rule of Napoleon III, the French Compagnie des chemins de fer de l'Est attempted to buy up numerous railway lines situated in southern and eastern Belgium in the provinces of Liège, Limburg and Luxembourg. The Belgian state, under Leopold II, felt that the takeover presented a military and political threat and intervened to stop the sale in 1869. A British diplomatic intervention made Napoleon back off, thus ending this Belgian Railway Crisis.

In 1870, the Belgian state owned 863 kilometres (536 mi) of rail lines, while the private enterprises owned 2,231 kilometres (1,386 mi). From 1870 to 1882, the railways were gradually nationalised under the Chemins de fer de l'État belge ("Railways of the Belgian State"). In 1912, 5,000 kilometres (3,100 mi) were state property compared to 300 kilometres (190 mi) of private lines. Belgian railways sustained significant damage during the German occupation of Belgium during World War I.

=== SNCB-NMBS ===
Confronted by a major post-war financial crisis, the nationalised railways were hived out to a concessionary company called the National Railway Company of Belgium (Société Nationale des Chemins de Fer Belges, Nationale Maatschappij der Belgische Spoorwegen, abbreviated to SNCB-NMBS) in 1926. The new enterprise included private shareholders but the Belgian state retained control over the business through a majority shareholding in the manner of a state-owned enterprise. The state also retained direct control over the railway lines. By 1958 the network was fully state-owned.

Amid the Great Depression, the SNCB-NMBS first introduced electrification on the 44 kilometres (27 mi) Brussels-North to Antwerp-Central line in May 1935. The system adopted was 3 kV DC.

During the German occupation in World War II, the SNCB-NMBS was forced to participate in the deportation of Belgian Jews to camps in Eastern Europe as part of the Holocaust.

=== Liberalisation ===
In 2005, the NMBS/SNCB was split up into three parts, to facilitate future liberalisation of railway freight and passenger services in agreement with European regulations. Several freight operators have since received access permissions for the Belgian network.

== Locomotives ==
The first Belgian-built locomotive, named Le Belge, was built under licence by John Cockerill & Cie. (the foremost Belgian industrial manufacturing firm at the time) according to a design licensed by Robert Stephenson & Co. in 1835. Le Belge is considered the first locomotive produced in continental Europe. Led by firms such as Cockerill, Belgium became a major centre of locomotive design and manufacture before World War II. Other companies included the Société Anglo-Franco-Belge, La Meuse and the Ateliers de Tubize.

The SNCB-NMBS traditionally terms its locomotives as classes or types.

== Tramways ==
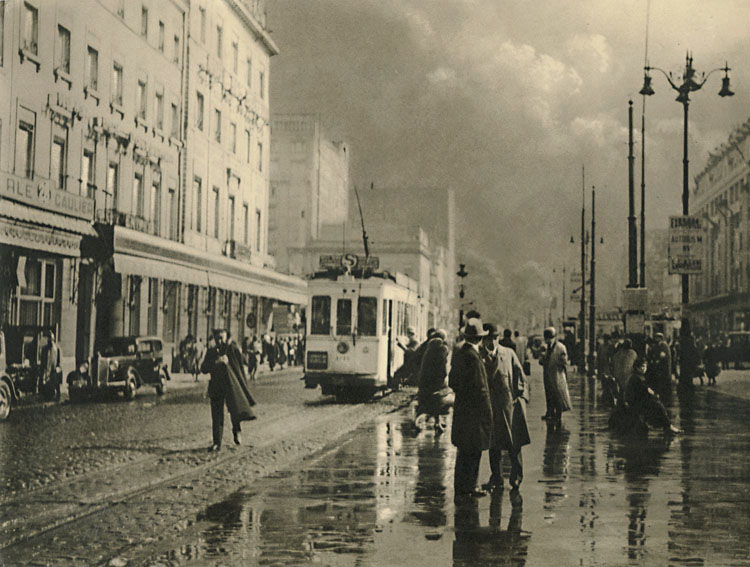
A Brussels tram pictured in 1937 by the photographer Léonard Misonne

Belgium has a long tradition of tramways as part of the public transport of its towns and cities. It once had the vicinal tramway, a network of trams that covered the whole nation, and whose total length was longer than the mainline railway network. Most of these tramways were closed due to the advent of cars and buses. Today there are seven tram systems operating in the country. The tram network in Brussels is one of the largest in the world and the seacoast line is the world's longest tram line. Horse-drawn trams operated from 1869 and the first electric trams appeared in 1894.

Belgians also played a major part in exporting tram components abroad. Édouard Empain, a Belgian industrialist and major investor in railways, gained the nickname "Tramway King" for his company's work in Russia, France, China, Egypt and the Congo and is perhaps best known for his work on the Paris Métro.

== Colonial and overseas railways ==
Numerous railways were built in the Congo Free State (1885-1908) and, subsequently, the Belgian Congo (1908-1960) under Belgian colonial rule. These remain the basis for the modern-day railway infrastructure of the Democratic Republic of the Congo.

Drawing on expertise and capital from their own country, Belgian engineers and railway companies were also engaged to build railways and tramsways overseas in Persia, Imperial China, the Ottoman Empire, and other countries during the late 19th and early 20th centuries.

== Museums and heritage railways ==
- Train World, a railway museum in Schaerbeek, Brussels opened on 25 September 2015,
- Museum of Patrimoine Ferroviaire et Tourisme at Saint-Ghislain in Hainaut province,
- Trois Vallées steam railway, a heritage railway based in Treignes in the province of Namur.
- Stoomtrein Maldegem - Eeklo
- Stoomtrein Dendermonde - Puurs
- Brussels Tram Museum, a collection of historic trams in Brussels.
- ASVi museum, a tram museum in Thuin, Hainaut province.

== See also ==
- Beijing–Hankou Railway in China, built by Belgian capital
- Pays de Waes (locomotive), oldest surviving Belgian locomotive
- History of Belgium
- Rail transport in Belgium
- Vennbahn
- History of rail transport in Luxembourg
