= 1869 Belgian railway crisis =

International conflict

The Belgian railway crisis was an international incident between the French Empire and Belgium in 1868 and 1869. It concerned the intention of the Compagnie des chemins de fer de l'Est ("Eastern Railways Company"), a French railway company, to take over two railway lines in eastern Belgium. The Belgian government suspected that the French imperial government wanted to acquire indirect influence in Belgium, thereby affecting its neutrality, so it prevented the project.

The conflict caused emotions to run high in both countries and had the potential to escalate into a European crisis or worse. France suspected secret interference by the North German Confederation, while Great Britain wanted to stay out of the crisis but also protect Belgium. The crisis was resolved by a compromise reached in a Franco-Belgian committee in Paris. Due to British pressure, the French emperor Napoleon III gave in and renounced an acquisition.

== Acquisition plans ==
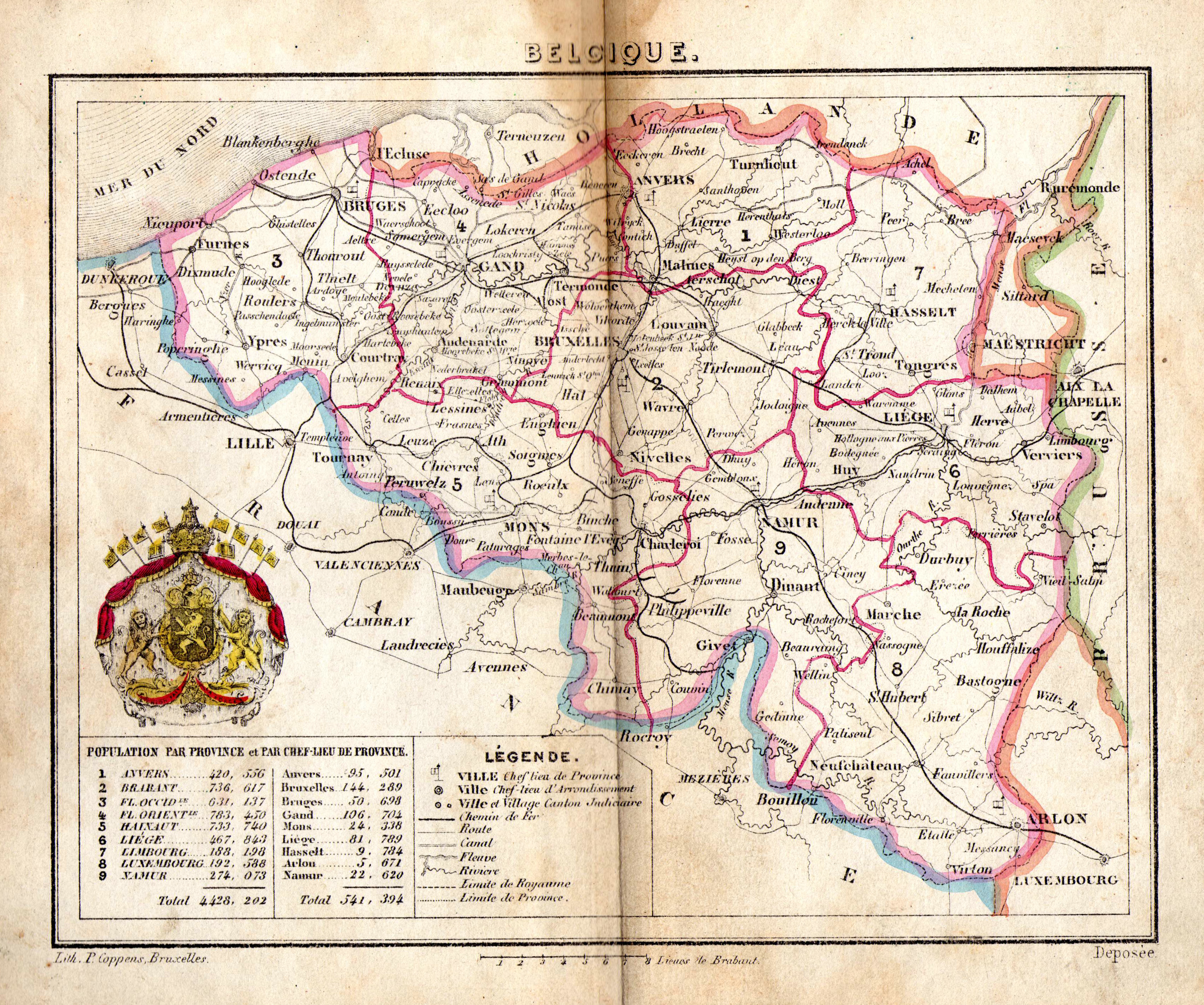
Map of Belgium with railroad lines, ca. 1850s

In Belgium of the time, many railway lines had been built by the government, but some lines had been given to commercial companies. This was the case especially in the east of Belgium. There was the Grande compagnie du Luxembourg with a line from Luxembourg to the north, and the Chemin de fer Liégeois-Limbourgeois with a line from Liège to the Dutch border. Both companies were in financial difficulties. The Belgian state did not want to buy them out, so in October 1868 they turned to a French railway company: the Chemins de fer de l'Est. It had already taken over the lines of the Société royale grand-ducale des chemins de fer Guillaume-Luxembourg from Luxembourg for 45 years at the beginning of the year. This would have given the Est control of the rail network from the Swiss to the Dutch border. It was financially supported by the French government.

On December 8, 1868, the Est concluded a preliminary agreement with the two Belgian ones. While the Belgian government knew about the project early on and did nothing, the Belgian public was outraged: the acquisition seemed like a dangerous economic penetration of the country, so the Belgian government now sought to prevent it. In turn, there were calls in the French press to annex Belgium.

The Belgian government resisted all the more against the tones from France, which reminded of the time of Napoleon I. On February 6, 1869, the government submitted a bill to Parliament: only with the approval of the state should foreign companies be allowed to buy or finance Belgian railways. Already on February 23, the law could come into force.

== Aggravation ==
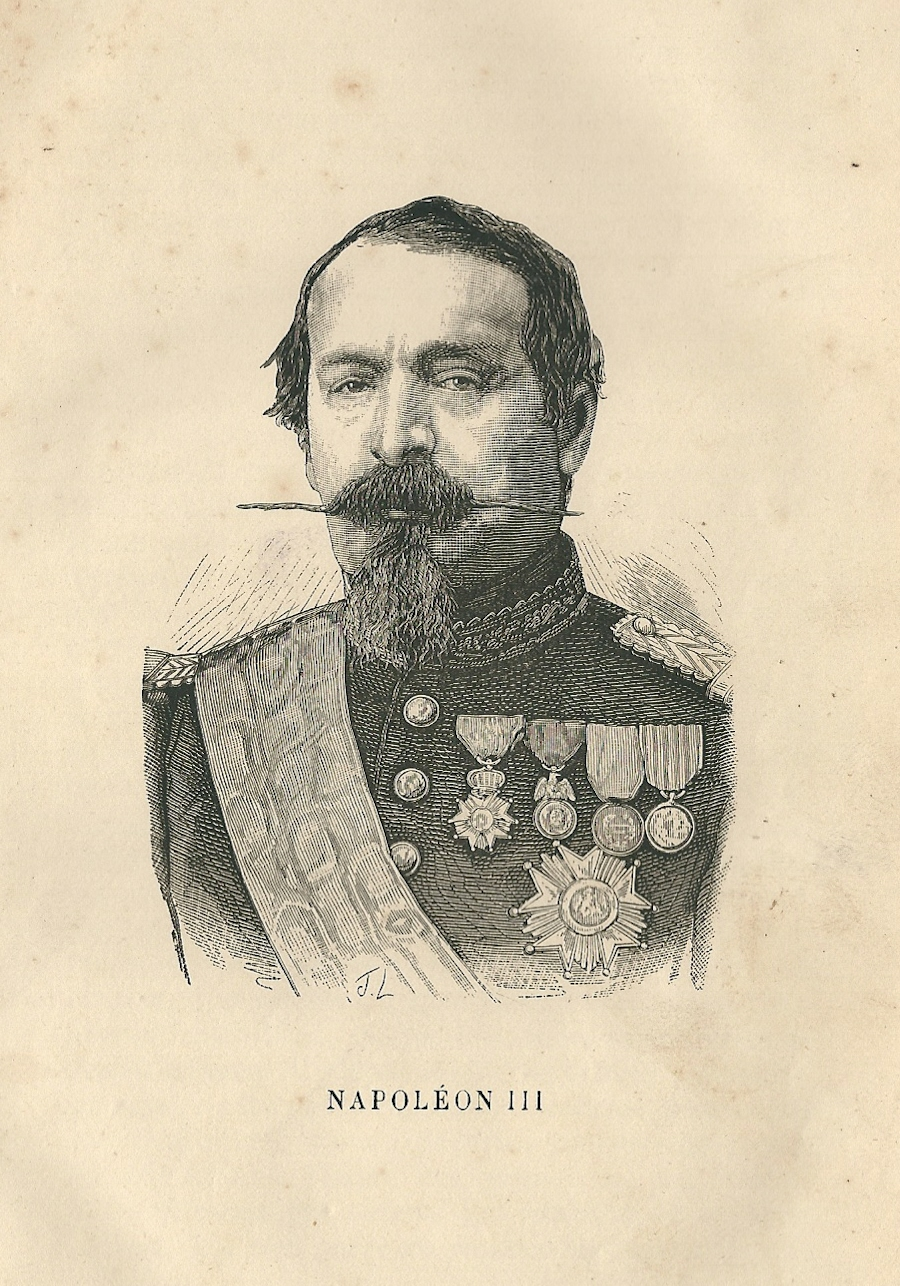
French Emperor Napoleon III endeavored to acquire Belgium, Luxembourg and German border territories.

While according to David Wetzel the French government was wrongly suspected, Klaus Hildebrand writes of an "encroachment on Belgian independence." With this, France had actually wanted to hit Prussia. In a mixture of fear and arrogance, the French Empire made a claim to supremacy in Europe. It demanded a withdrawal of the law and suspected Prussia of being behind the Belgian resistance. In fact, North German Federal Chancellor Otto von Bismarck had not yet intervened in the crisis.

Since 1864, the British foreign policy had entered a period of non-intervention. A lack of an official definition of non-intervention caused confusion in the years following, and diminished Britain's prestige on the Continent. For example, in Summer 1866, during the war between Austria and Prussia, Britain did not intermediate. Britain did intervene, exceptionally, in the Luxembourg Crisis of 1867 and turned out to guarantee Luxembourg's independence. The Belgian railways crisis was, "like the crisis over Luxembourg in 1867, a tempest in a teapost caused by the desire to strengthen her eastern frontiers."

The British Foreign Secretary George Villiers Clarendon actually wanted to stay out of the matter, even though Belgian neutrality was of the highest priority to him. Bismarck, however, endeavoured to link Belgian neutrality and the German question. He pointed out to Britain that northern Germany could defend Belgium only together with Britain. Otherwise, he hinted, he might come to an agreement with France on German unity by surrendering Belgium to the French emperor. The British government, however, dreaded the prospect of getting into a Franco-Prussian war, which a British-Prussian alliance would make more likely.

Foreign Secretary Clarendon tried unsuccessfully to convince the French that Prussians were not always behind French failures. He correctly trusted, however, that France did not want a break with Great Britain, although the emperor now saw the railway question as a personal matter. Clarendon suggested to the Belgian government that it buys the two railway companies itself. Belgium did not want to set a precedent, however, since other Belgian railway companies were also experiencing financial problems.

== Negotiations in Paris ==
After Napoleon III had demanded, on March 6, a Franco-Belgian committee to settle all questions, Great Britain at least favoured a mixed committee of inquiry. In doing so, Foreign Secretary Clarendon had gone a long way toward accommodating the French, as he wanted to take Napoleon's domestic difficulties into account. Meanwhile, he warned the British ambassador in Belgium's capital Brussels that British support for Belgium had limits and that no false expectations should be raised. Clarendon's goal was to force Belgium to compromise. He also succeeded in keeping the British public quiet. Had the latter realized the danger Belgium was in, it could have urged the government to take dramatic action.

London already feared a war in which France would defeat Prussia and then perhaps even dominate the Belgian and Dutch coasts. They welcomed the level-headed manner of Bismarck, who was aware of the implications of the Paris negotiations. The French negotiators around the Brussels ambassador appeared lofty and provocative. They demanded that the Belgian government agree to the sale of the two railway companies. The Belgian prime minister, on the other hand, wanted at best to grant rights of way and, on top of that, to fix the tariffs. His government was desperate to retain control over railways on Belgian territory. The prime minister succeeded in dragging out the negotiations by making counter-proposals. On April 16, he threatened to appeal to the powers that guarantee Belgian neutrality. His French counterpart left the room, shouting that Prussia was behind it and that sooner or later war would have to come.

Therefore, Foreign Secretary Clarendon let the French know that a humiliation of Belgium would disrupt relations with Britain; he had already written to his Brussels ambassador that an alliance of Britain with Prussia was always possible. The Channel Fleet was put under steam. Alarmed, Napoleon gave in. The governments of France and Belgium signed a protocol to that effect on April 27, 1869. The following, commercial negotiations lasted into the summer.

== Evaluation ==
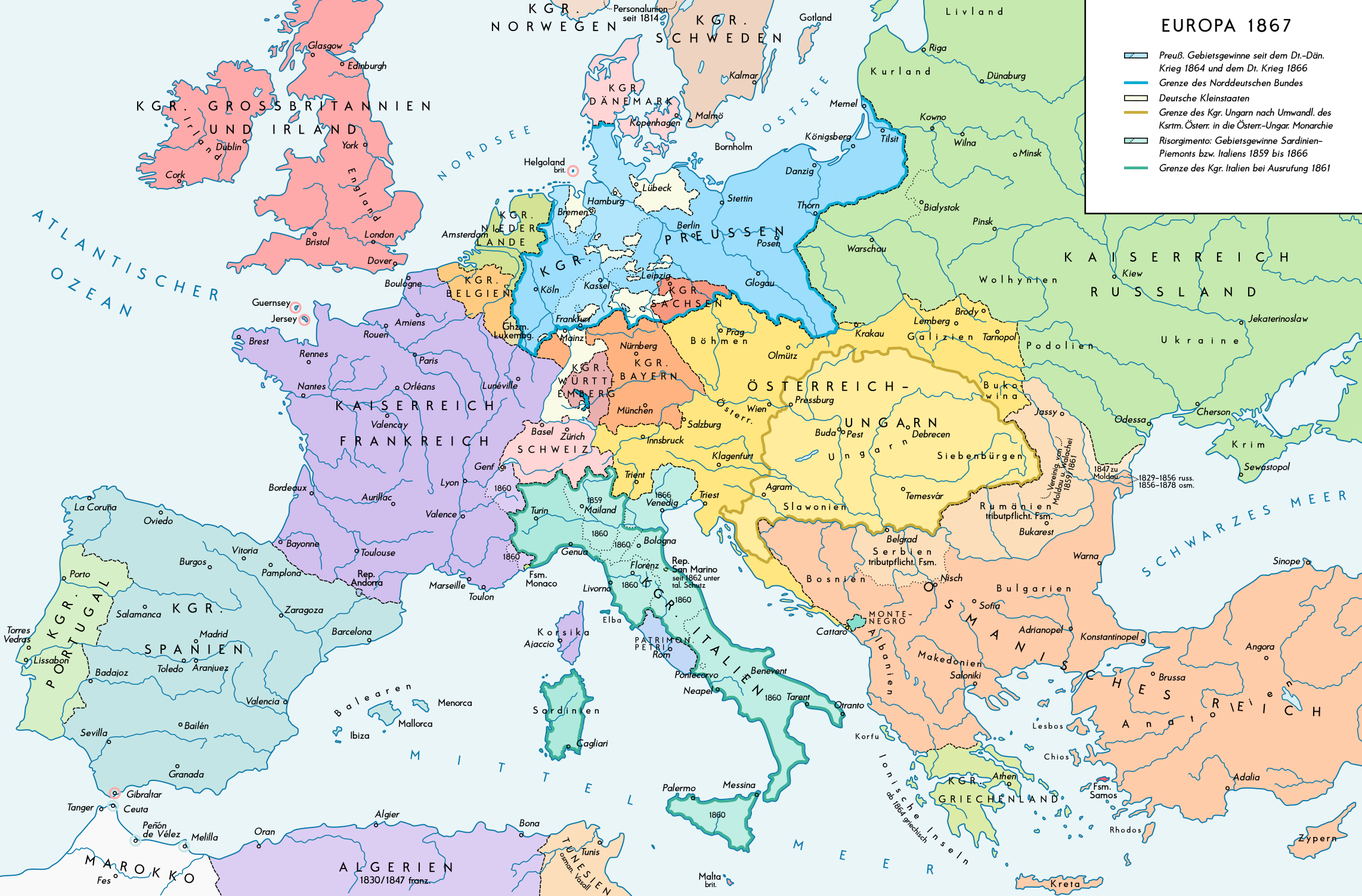
Europe in 1867

In research, it has been assumed that Napoleon gave in because an alliance with Austria-Hungary had not materialized and he was wary of war. Alternatively, the prospect of a British-Prussian alliance might have led him to do so. Klaus Hildebrand, on the other hand, agrees that Belgium's resistance and Britain's resolute appearance were decisive. Britain had many opportunities to form alliances and bring its global weight to bear. Napoleon understood the disadvantages of breaking with the other major Western power.

While France had considered Prussia the main enemy since the turn of 1866/1867, Great Britain just considered the European balance restored. Britain recognized in the railway crisis that France was behaving warlike and Prussia prudent. Despite Bismarck's domestic policies, it was noted positively that the chancellor had resigned himself to the status quo for the time being and was also not trying to destroy Austria-Hungary. Moreover, there was a generally friendly mood toward Britain in Prussia and Germany, quite unlike in France. Britain emerged from the crisis with the awareness that, despite military impotence, it had scored a political success. Subsequently, it continued to strive for neutrality toward France and the North German Confederation.

The government's adhesion to the principle of non-intervention, Craig explains, met only a few critics in Britain itself: that Belgium was forced to negotiate with France in Paris and that the guarantee of Belgium's neutrality might have been aggrieved. It avoided to become involved in disputes on the Continent and to make obligations. With regard to Belgium, prime minister Gladstone thought that "a guarantee gave the right of interference [but] did not constitute of itself an obligation to interfere".

== See also ==
- Treaty of London (1839) on the neutrality of Belgium.
- History of rail transport in Belgium
