= Le Belge (locomotive) =

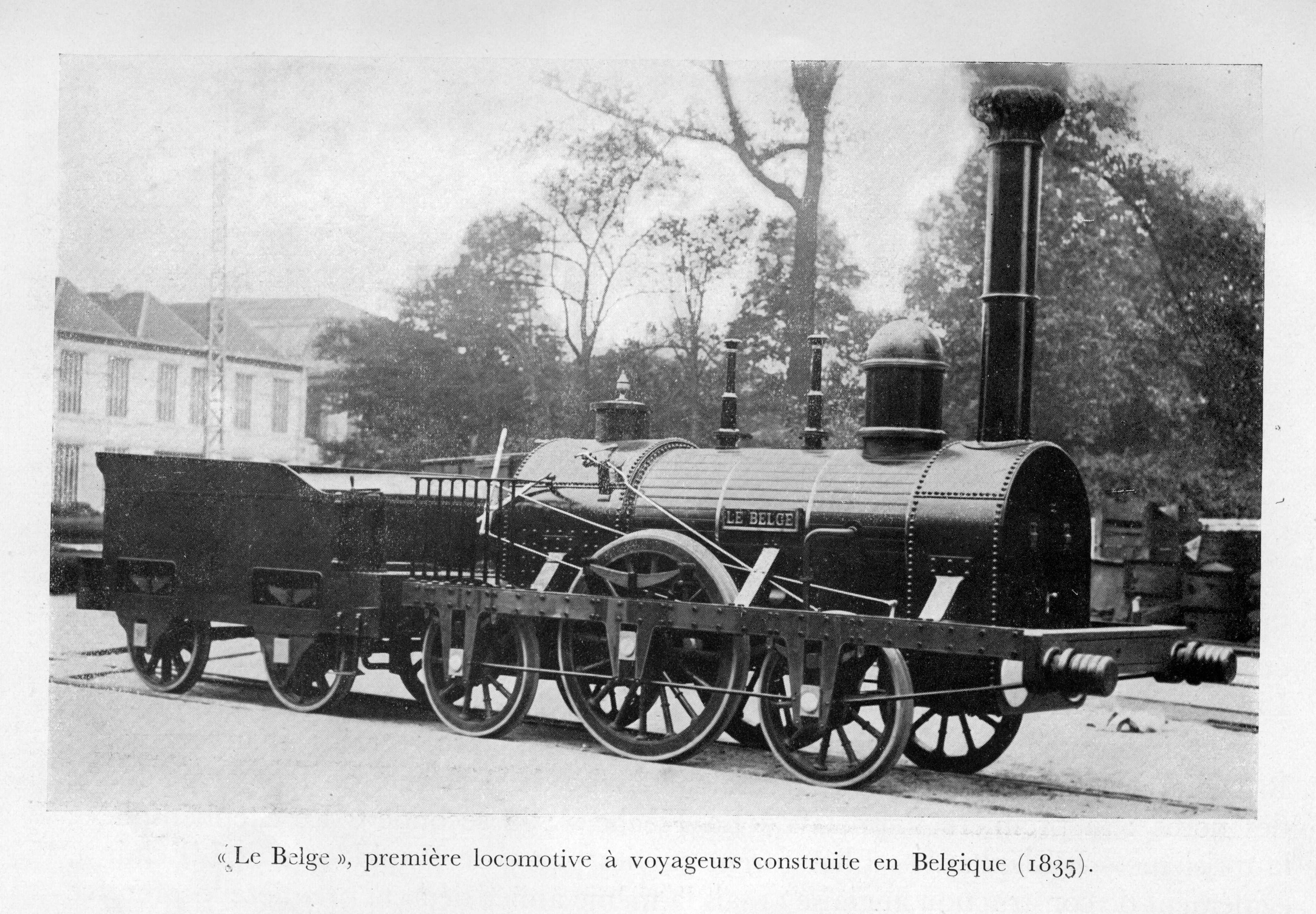
Type and origin
- Power type: Steam
- Builder: John Cockerill & Cie.
- Build date: 1835
Specifications
- Configuration
  - UIC: 1A1
- Gauge: 1,435 mm (4 ft 8 1/2 in) standard gauge
- Driver dia.: 1,524 mm (60.0 in)
- Loco weight: 11,560 kg (25,490 lb) (in running order)
- Boiler pressure: 4 kg/cm^{2} (390 kPa; 57 psi)
- Heating surface
  - Firebox: 0.86 m^{2} (9.3 sq ft)
  - Total surface: 33.6 m^{2} (362 sq ft)
- Cylinders: 2
- Cylinder size: 280 mm (11.02 in) (bore) x 458 mm (18.03 in) (stroke)
Performance figures
- Maximum speed: 60 km/h (37 mph)
- Power output: 40 hp (30 kW) or 50 hp or 37 kW)

Le Belge (French; lit. 'The Belgian') was a 2-2-2 Patentee type steam locomotive with tender built in 1835 and operational until 1869. Built by John Cockerill & Cie under license from the British firm Robert Stephenson & Co., it was the first railway locomotive built in Belgium and among the first in Continental Europe.

== Background ==
Belgium became independent in the Belgian Revolution of 1830. After Great Britain, it was the second country in Europe to enter into the Industrial Revolution with the emergence of coal mining, steel, metalworking, and manufacturing industries along the sillon industriel as well as an important textile industry in Ghent and Verviers. In the immediate aftermath of national independence however, Belgium entered a period of economic dislocation caused by the rupture with the United Netherlands and the continuing Dutch blockade of Scheldt cutting off shipping to the inland port of Antwerp.

Five years before the Belgian Revolution, the Stockton and Darlington Railway in northern England had become the first public railway to use the new technology of steam locomotives built by Robert Stephenson & Co. Inspired by British precedent, the Belgian government had begun to consider establishing an ambitious railways network under state control as early as August 1831. It was also hoped that the railways would revitalise the country's commerce. Among Liberals in particular, it was also felt that railways would not serve a purely economic function but were also necessary part of forging a new national identity.

By 1834, the Belgian government approved a plan to build a railway between Mons and Antwerp running through the capital Brussels at a cost of 150 million Belgian francs. Other lines were also envisaged from the outset. The first stretch linking Schaerbeek (Brussels) and Mechelen was completed in May 1835 and was the first steam passenger railway in Continental Europe.

== Design and operation ==
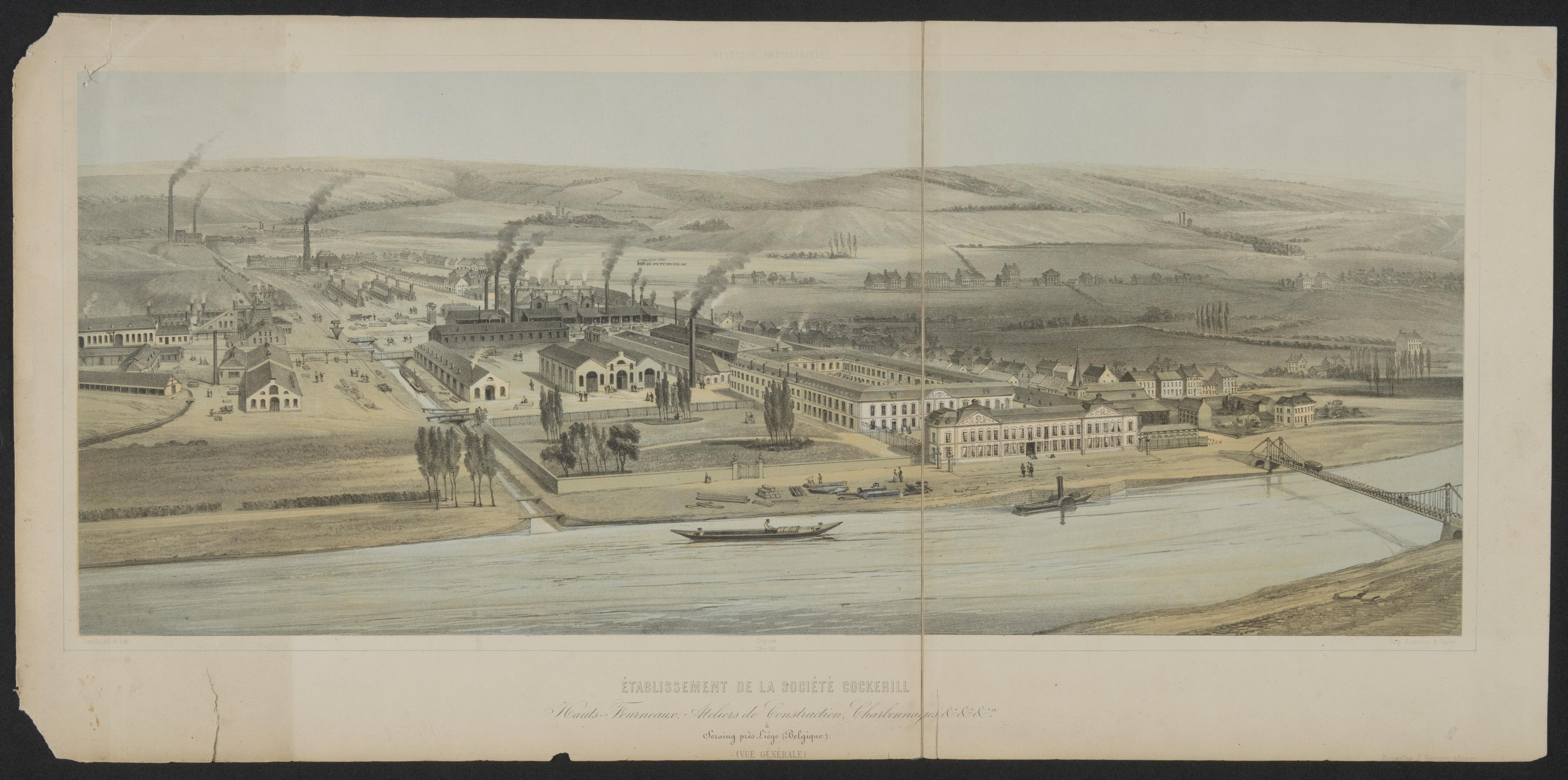
Cockerill's factories at Seraing, near Liège from La Belgique industrielle (1850)

As part of its railway ambitions, the Belgian government had ordered five locomotives of the 2-2-2 "Patentee" type from Robert Stephenson & Co which refined the original Stephenson's Rocket design. The five were named La Flèche ("Arrow"), L'Eléphant ("Elephant"), Stephenson, La Rapide ("Fast-Mover"), and L'Eclair ("Lightning"). All were built and exported from Great Britain. British technologies and engineers were vital to Belgium's first railway and George Stephenson personally travelled aboard the first train between Brussels and Mechelen.

As the sixth locomotive, Le Belge was built on the same model but was built under license by the major industrial firm John Cockerill & Cie at its workshops in Seraing, Liège Province. It was delivered on 30 December 1835.

The locomotive itself was 5.45 metres (17.9 ft) long and weighed 11.75 metric tons (11.56 long tons; 12.95 short tons). It had 41 horsepower and was capable of 60 kilometres per hour (37 mph). Subject to various modifications over its operational life, it was finally retired from service and scrapped in 1869.

== Replicas ==
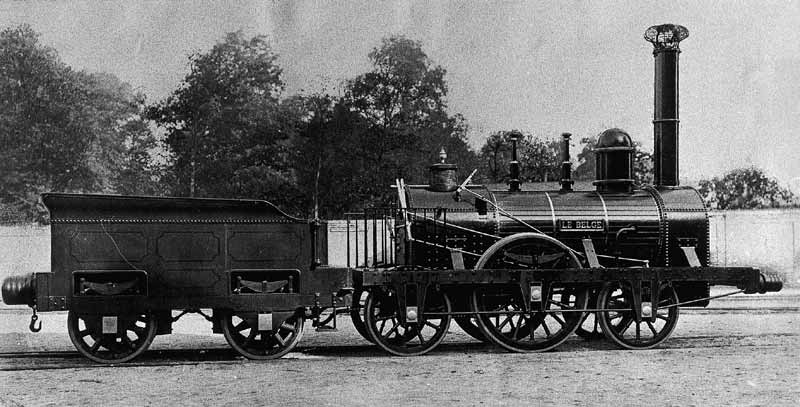
A replica of Le Belge

Various replicas have been made of Le Belge. The first faithful replica was built by the Mechelen Central Workshop for the fiftieth anniversary of the Belgian railway system in 1885. It was later exhibited at the 1913 Universal Exhibition in Ghent but was destroyed during World War I.

Two further replicas were built by SA John Cockerill in 1925 and 1927. Both were severely damaged during World War II. Originally built to mark King Albert I's visit to the factory, the 1927 replica was repaired and is currently displayed at the Train World museum in Brussels.

A fourth all-wood replica was built by the inhabitants of Vresse-sur-Semois to mark the 150th anniversary of Belgium's independence in 1980.

== See also ==
- Adler (locomotive), the first Stephenson locomotive operational in Germany (1835)
- De Arend (locomotive), the first Stephenson locomotive operational in the Netherlands (1839)
- Pays de Waes (locomotive), the oldest surviving Belgian locomotive (1844)
