= Patentee (locomotive) =

Steam locomotive introduced in 1833

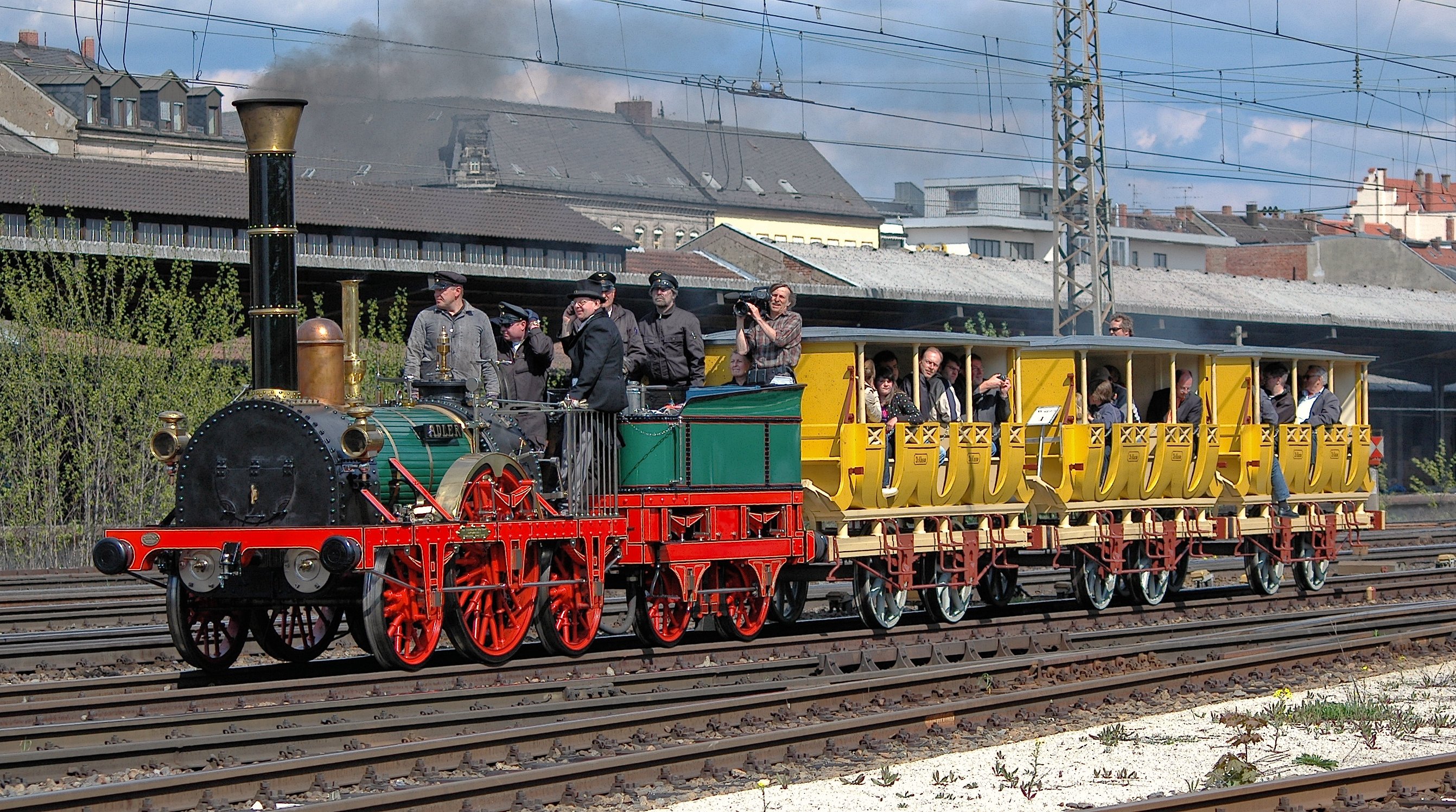
- Replica of the Patentee type Adler.
Type and origin
- Power type: Steam
- Builder: Robert Stephenson and Company
- Build date: 1834
Specifications
- Configuration
  - Whyte: 2-2-2
- Gauge: 1,435 mm (4 ft 8 1/2 in)
- Couplers: buffers and chain
Career
- Operators: Liverpool and Manchester Railway

The Patentee locomotive was a revolutionary 2-2-2 steam locomotive type introduced by Robert Stephenson and Company in 1833, as an enlargement of their 2-2-0 Planet type. The wheel arrangement of two leading wheels on one axle, two powered driving wheels on one axle, and two trailing wheels on one axle provided more stability and enabled a larger firebox than the earlier 0-2-2 and 2-2-0 types.

One of the earliest examples, Adler, the first successful locomotive to operate in Germany, was a Patentee supplied by Robert Stephenson and Company in component form in December 1835. Other examples were exported to the Netherlands (notably De Arend in 1839), Russia and Italy. Another, Le Belge, was the first steam railway locomotive built in Belgium, constructed in 1835 by John Cockerill under license from Stephenson's company. By 1838 the type had become the standard passenger design by Robert Stephenson and Company.

Daniel Gooch oversaw the building of two Patentee style Locomotives, originally intended for the New Orleans Railway at 5 ft 6 in broad gauge. When the American order was withdrawn, the North Star and Morning Star were sold to the Great Western Railway and converted to Isambard Kingdom Brunel's 7 ft broad gauge, forming the basis of the GWR Star Class locomotives.
