= Pays de Waes (locomotive) =

Belgian steam locomotive

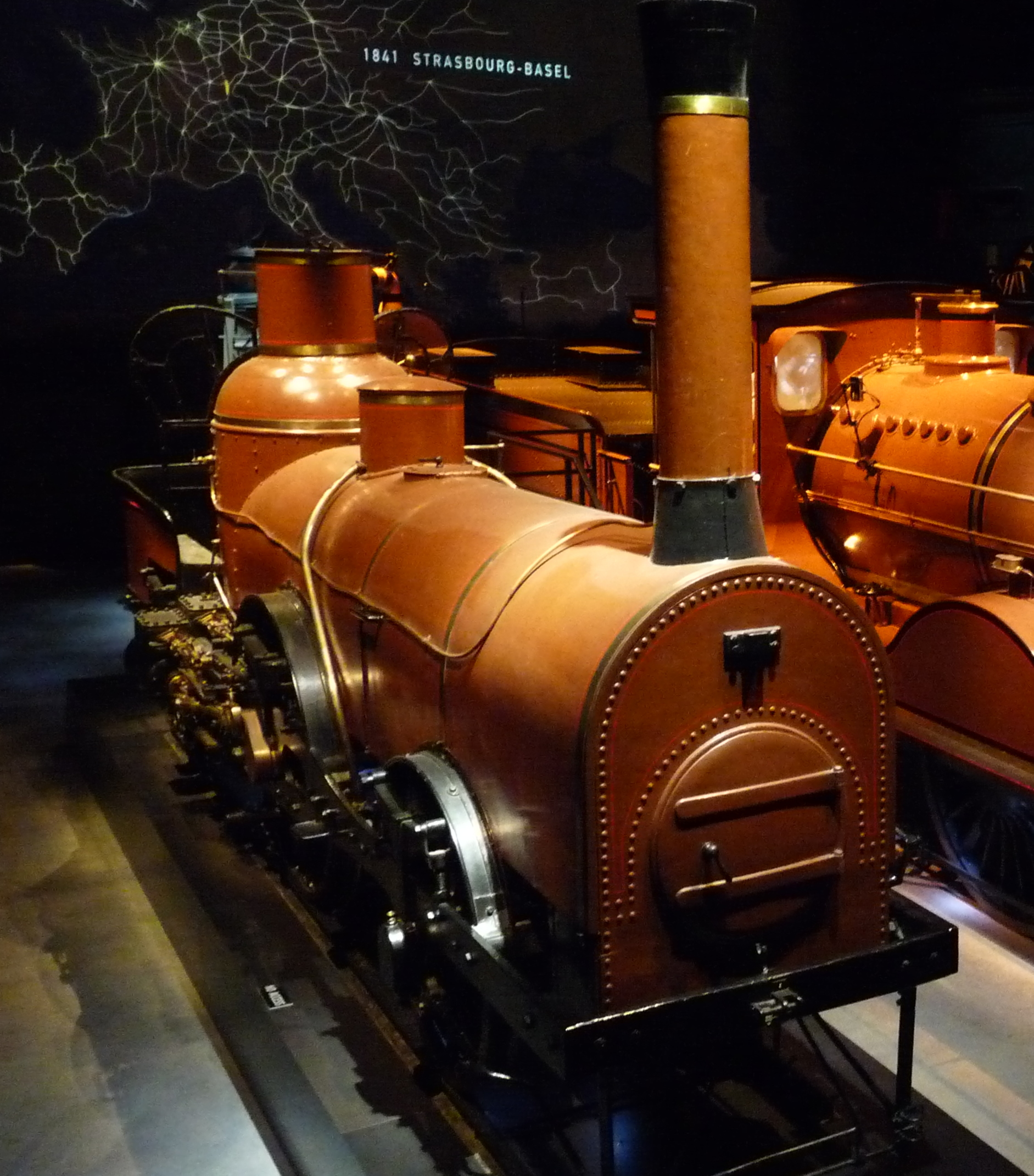
- Pays de Waes locomotive on display at Train World.
Type and origin
- Power type: Steam
- Builder: Gustave De Ridder’s workshop
- Build date: 1844
Specifications
- Configuration
  - Whyte: 2-2-2ST
- Length: 8.6 m (28 ft 3 in)
- Width: 2.15 m (7 ft 1 in)
- Height: 3.95 m (13 ft 0 in)
- Loco weight: 13.5 tonnes (13.3 long tons; 14.9 short tons)-17.55 tonnes (17.27 long tons; 19.35 short tons)
Career
- Operators: Compagnie du chemin de fer d'Anvers à Gand par Saint-Nicolas et Lokeren

The Pays de Waes is a tank locomotive built in 1844 which is reputed to be the oldest preserved locomotive in Continental Europe. It is part of the historical collection of the National Railway Company of Belgium and is on display at Train World (Brussels).

== Background ==
Belgium became independent in the Belgian Revolution of 1830. After Great Britain, it was the second country in Europe to enter into the Industrial Revolution with the emergence of coal mining, steel, metalworking, and manufacturing industries along the sillon industriel in southern Belgium.

By 1834, the Belgian government approved a plan to build a railway between Mons and Antwerp running through the capital Brussels at a cost of 150 million Belgian francs. Other lines were also envisaged from the outset. The first stretch linking Schaerbeek (Brussels) and Mechelen was completed in May 1835 and was the first steam passenger railway in Continental Europe. The first Belgian-built locomotive, Le Belge, was produced under license in December 1835.

The expansion of the national network continued over the 1830s and 1840s. Each provincial capital (except Arlon and Hasselt) had a railway station by 1843. Within ten years of its first railway, Belgium had more than 560 kilometres (350 mi) of railway lines, 80 stations, 143 locomotives and 25,000 pieces of rolling stock.

== Pays de Waes ==
The "Pays de Waes" is the second locomotive in a series of nine machines designed by the Belgian engineer Gustave De Ridder. Built in his private workshops, the locomotive was put into service on a narrow gauge line running from Antwerp, through Sint-Niklaas and Lokeren, to Ghent operated by the Compagnie du chemin de fer d'Anvers à Gand par Saint-Nicolas et Lokeren (a private company) in 1845, a narrow gauge line (1,151 mm (3 ft 9 5/16 in) vs 1,435 mm / 4 ft 8 1/2 in). The locomotive reached a speed of 60 km/h (37 mph) in 1844, the year of its construction.

The locomotive is named after Waasland (Pays de Waes in French) in East Flanders where it commonly ran between 1844/1845 and 1896.

== Preservation ==
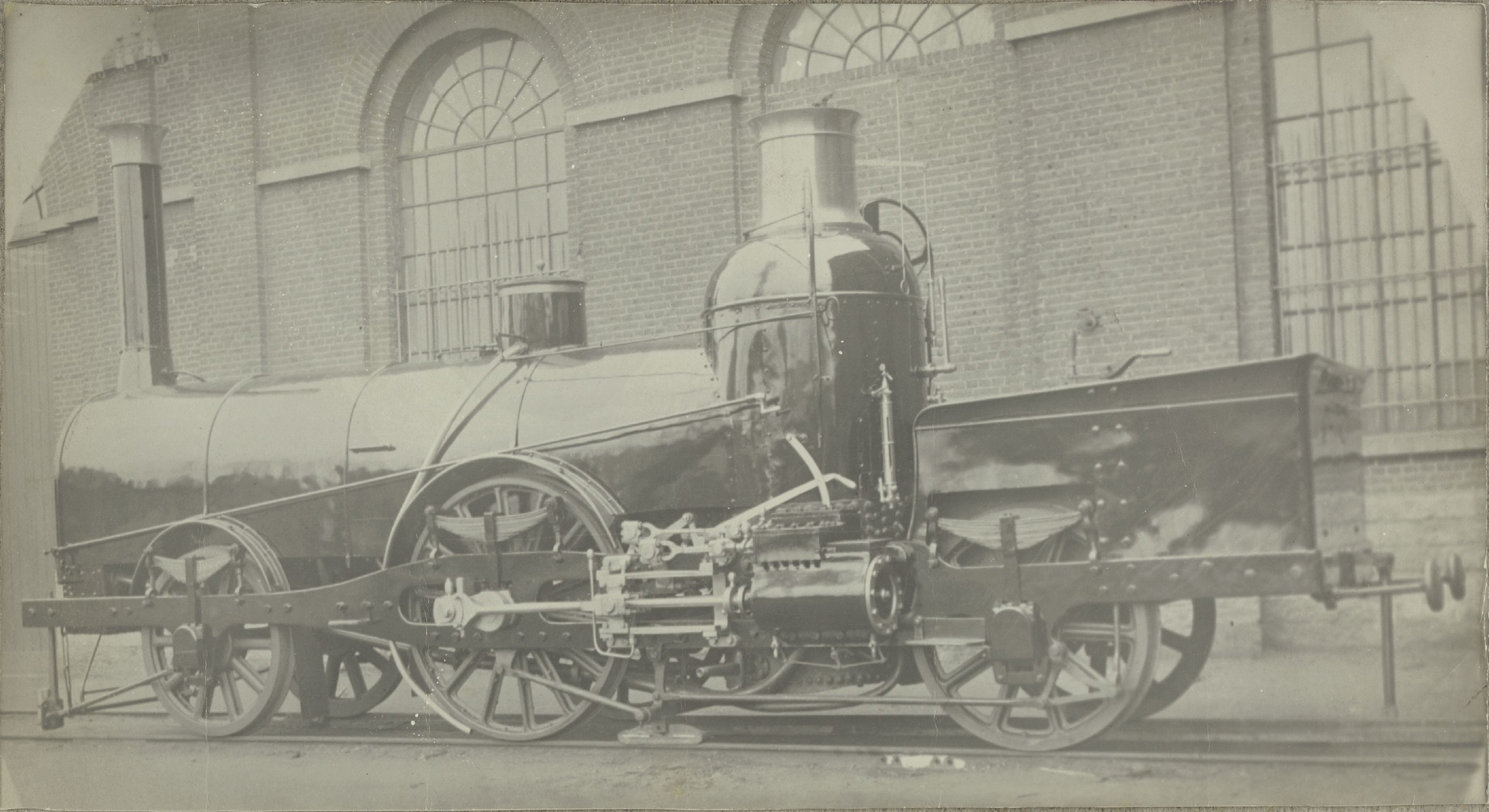
Pays de Waes photographed in 1895

The series of nine locomotives were taken out of service between 1880 and 1890. The "Pays de Waes" was still intact in 1896 when the Belgian State took over the line and converted it to standard gauge. All other locomotives in the series were scrapped.

The preserved locomotive was exhibited at the 1913 World Fair in Ghent and then in England in 1925 to mark the centenary of the railways held in Darlington. It was then placed on display (starting in 1958) at the railway museum located in the Brussels-North station complex until March 22, 2014, when it was transferred to the current Belgian railway museum, Train World. This required breaking a wall at the Brussels-North station to move it. It is now displayed in Train World's Hall 1, to show the beginnings of the railways in Europe.
