= Train World =

Railway museum in Brussels, Belgium

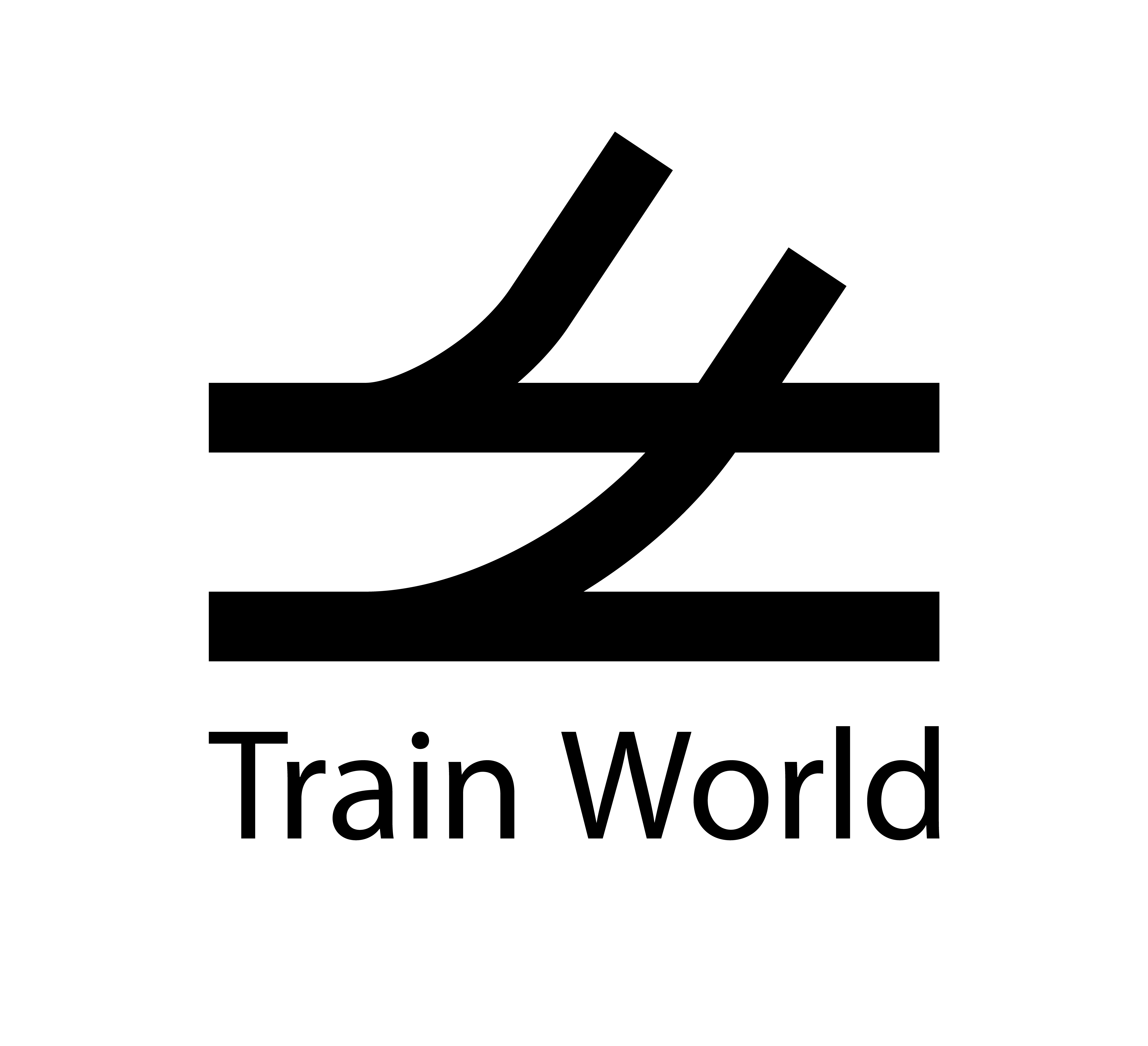

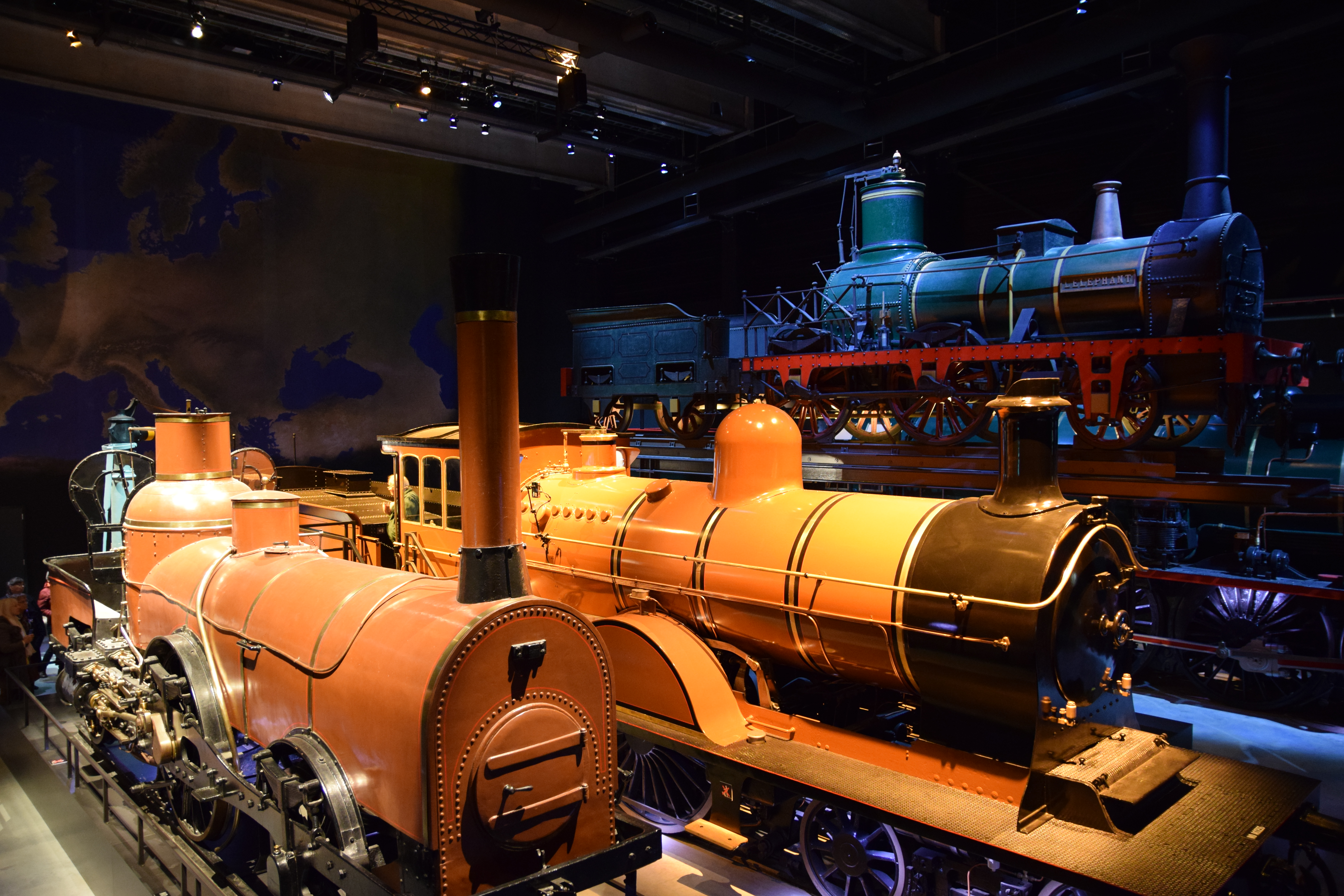
- Display of "Pays du Waes" (left) and type 18 (right) steam locomotives at Train World
- Interactive fullscreen map
- Established: 25 September 2015; 10 years ago
- Location: Schaerbeek railway station, Place Princesse Elisabeth / Prinses Elisabethplein 5, 1030 Schaerbeek, Brussels-Capital Region, Belgium
- Coordinates: 50°52′41″N 4°22′46″E
- Type: Railway museum
- Website: www.trainworld.be/en

Train World is a railway museum in Schaerbeek, a municipality of Brussels, Belgium, and the official museum of the National Railway Company of Belgium (NMBS/SNCB). It is situated in the preserved buildings of Schaerbeek railway station and in a new shed built to its north. The museum was opened in September 2015 by King Philippe.

== History and location ==
Train World is located at Schaerbeek railway station, incorporating the station building. The museum's scenography was designed by the comic book artist François Schuiten.

The museum was scheduled to be opened in 2014, but was delayed and was open to the public on 25 September 2015, having been formally opened the previous day by King Philippe. Until then, €20.5 million had been invested into the project, which planned to attract 100,000 visitors per year from its third year of operations onwards.

== Overview ==
The museum is over 8,000 square metres (86,000 sq ft) and displays 22 locomotives, as well as 1,200 other objects, including an original 19th-century railway bridge. Also featured is an interactive railway simulator, where players drive a train through current-day Schaerbeek, and a possible future Brussels.

One of the most important objects in the museum is the "Pays du Waes" steam locomotive, dating from 1845, which is the oldest preserved locomotive in continental Europe.

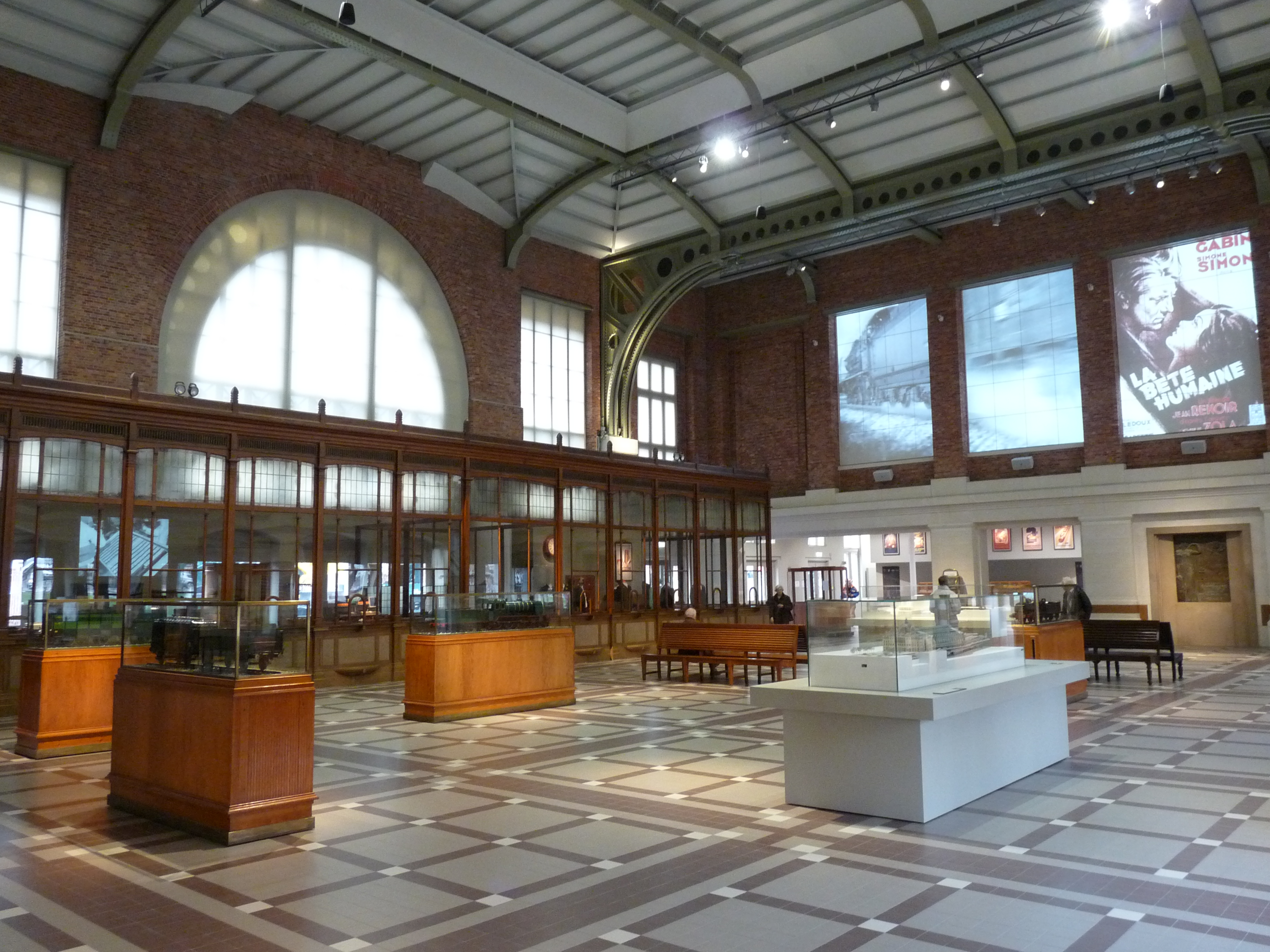
Former ticket hall of Schaerbeek railway station, now used as an exhibition space

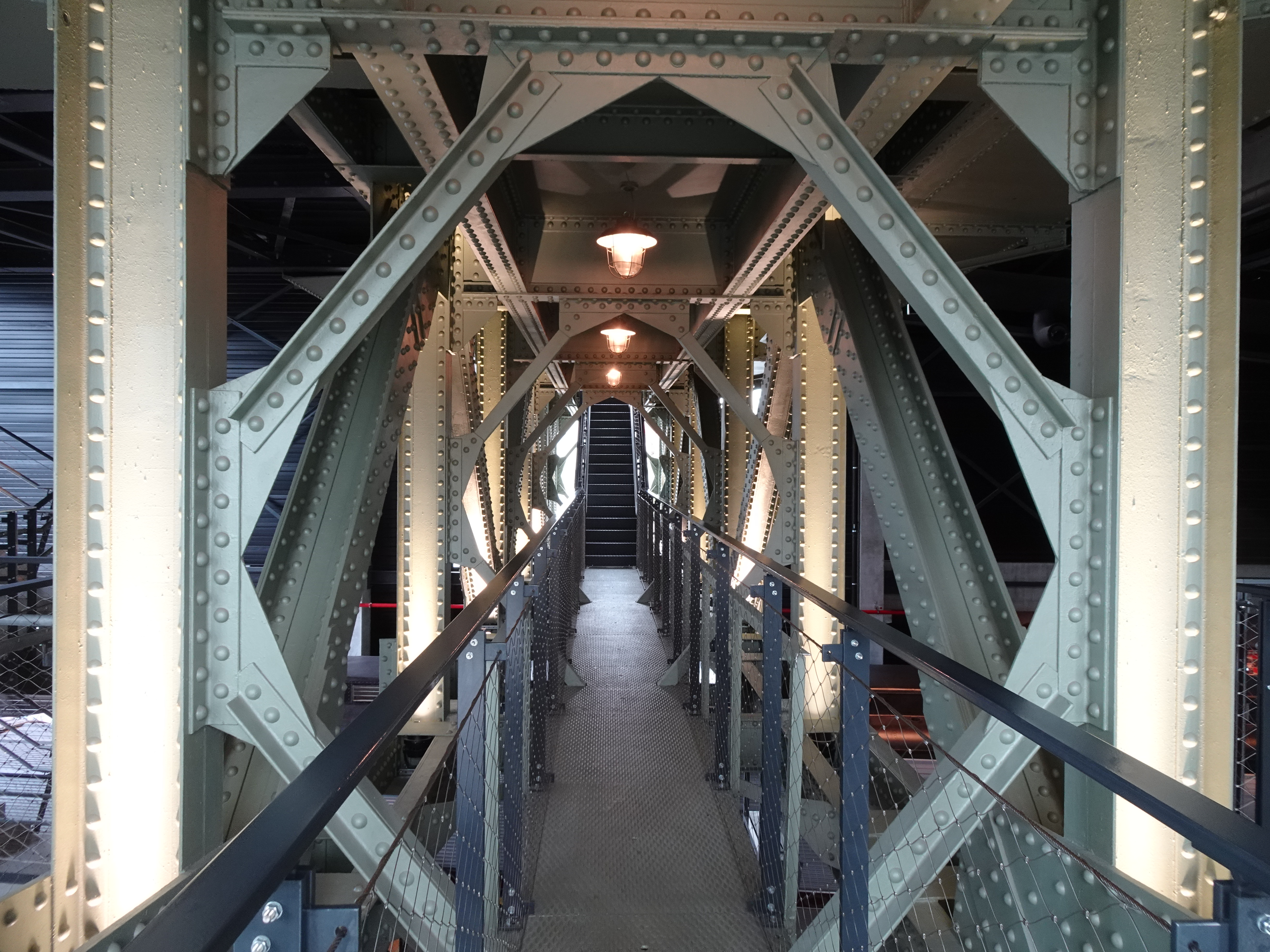
Deck of a railway viaduct over the Meuse, which now serves as a raised platform for the public

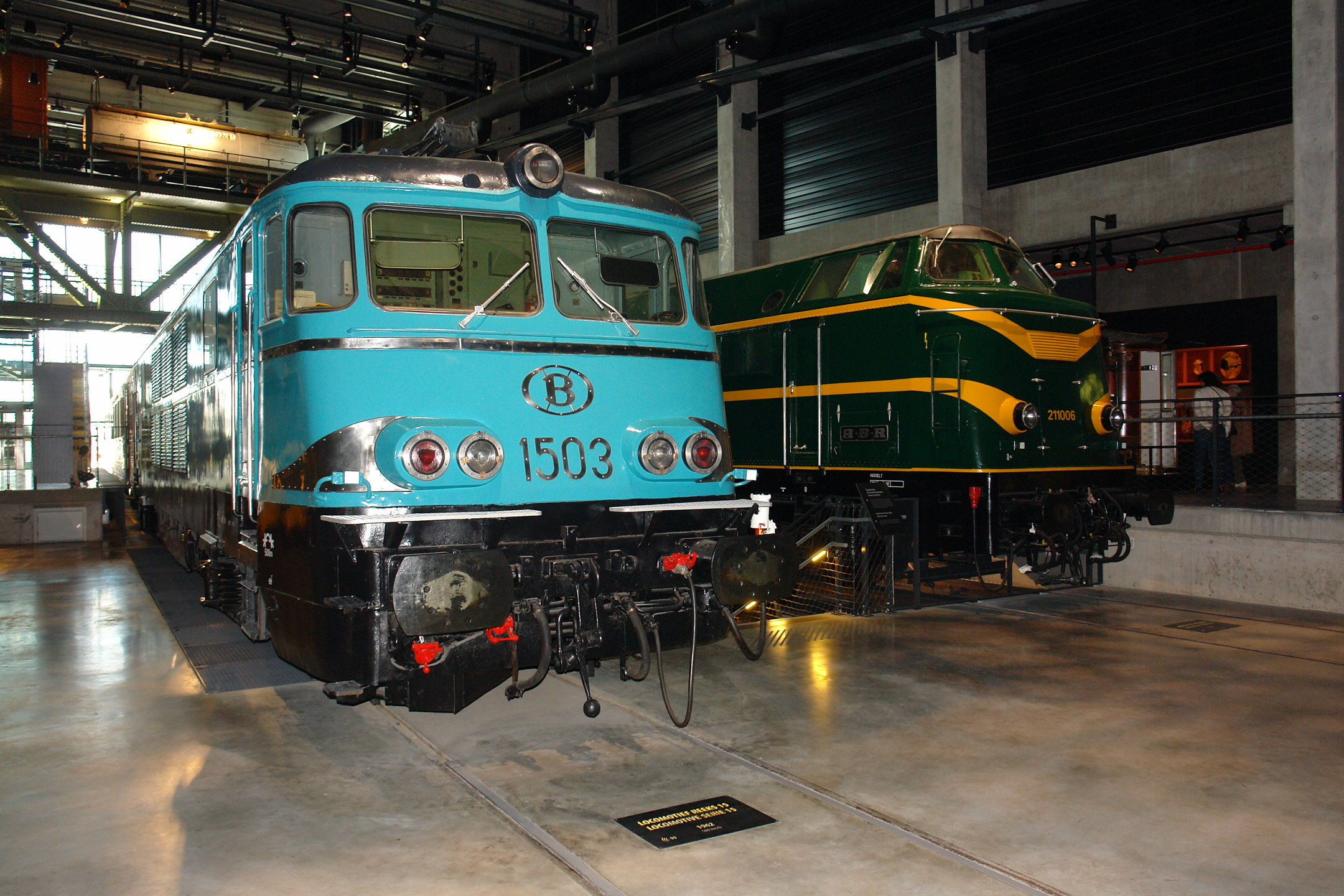
Electric locomotive 1503 (left) and diesel locomotive 6406 (right)

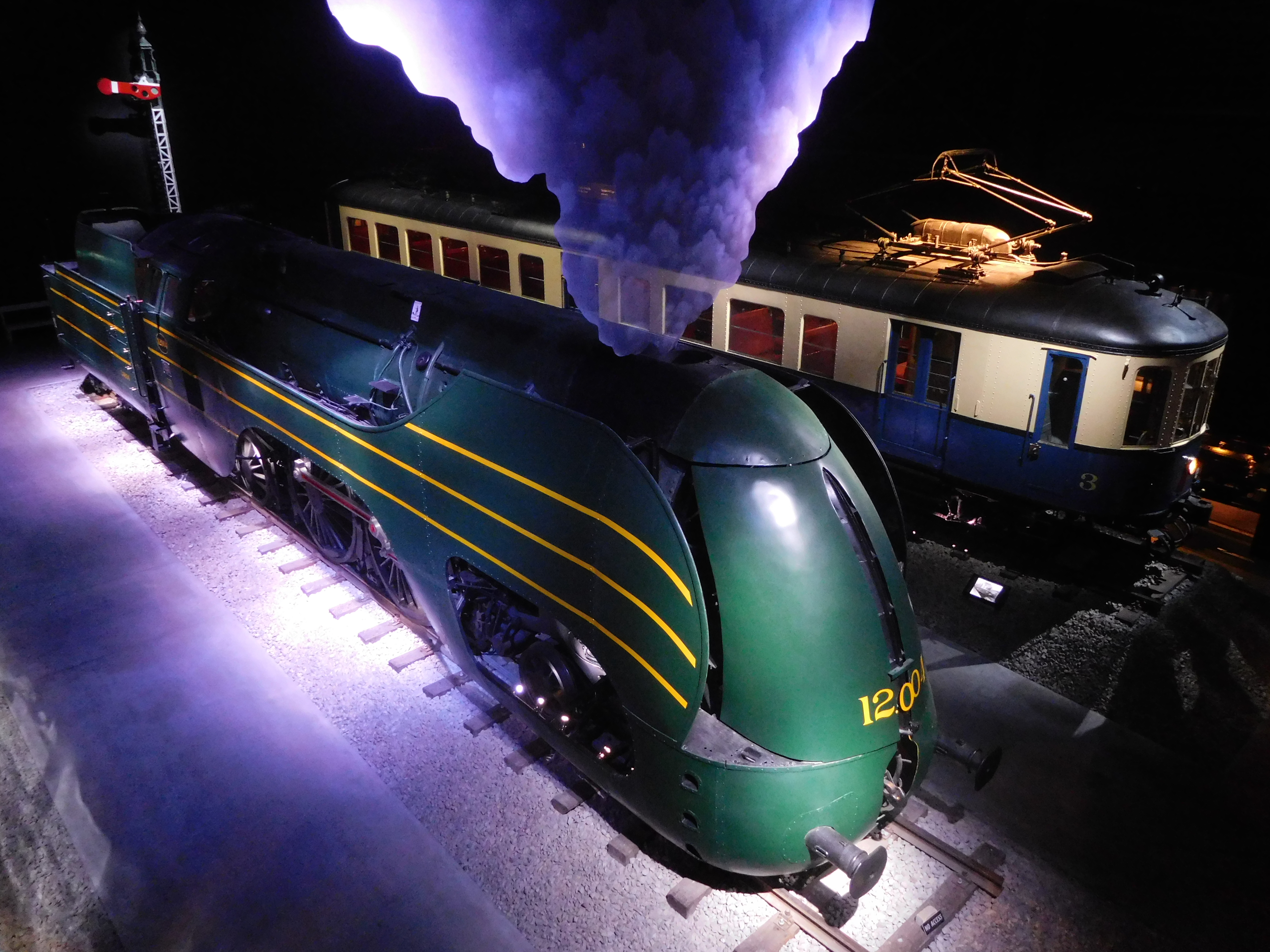
Steam locomotive type 12 (left) and AM 35 (right)

== See also ==
- History of Brussels
- History of rail transport in Belgium
- Culture of Belgium
- Belgium in the long nineteenth century
