= List of heritage railways =

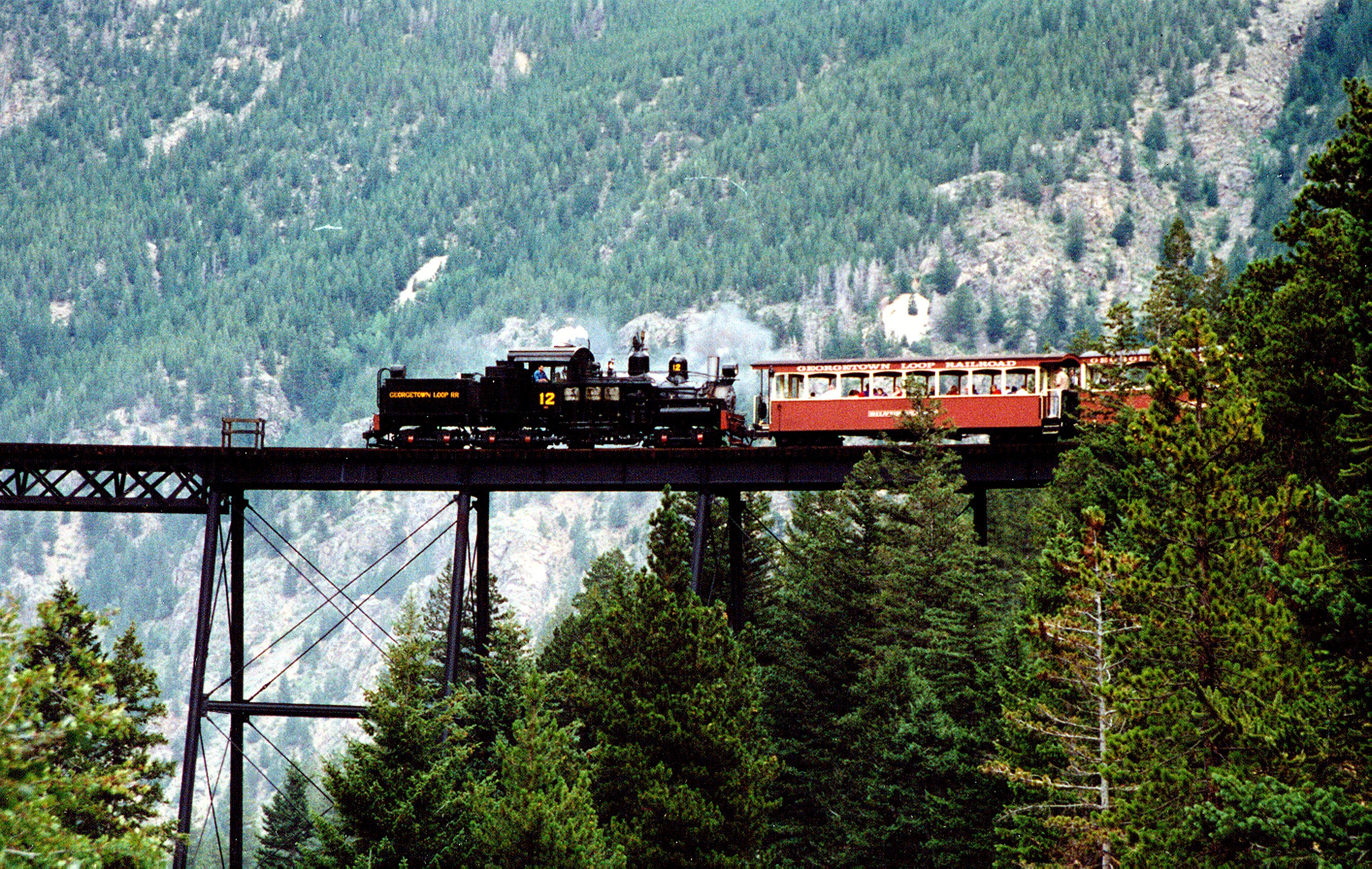
Georgetown Loop Railroad in Colorado, United States.

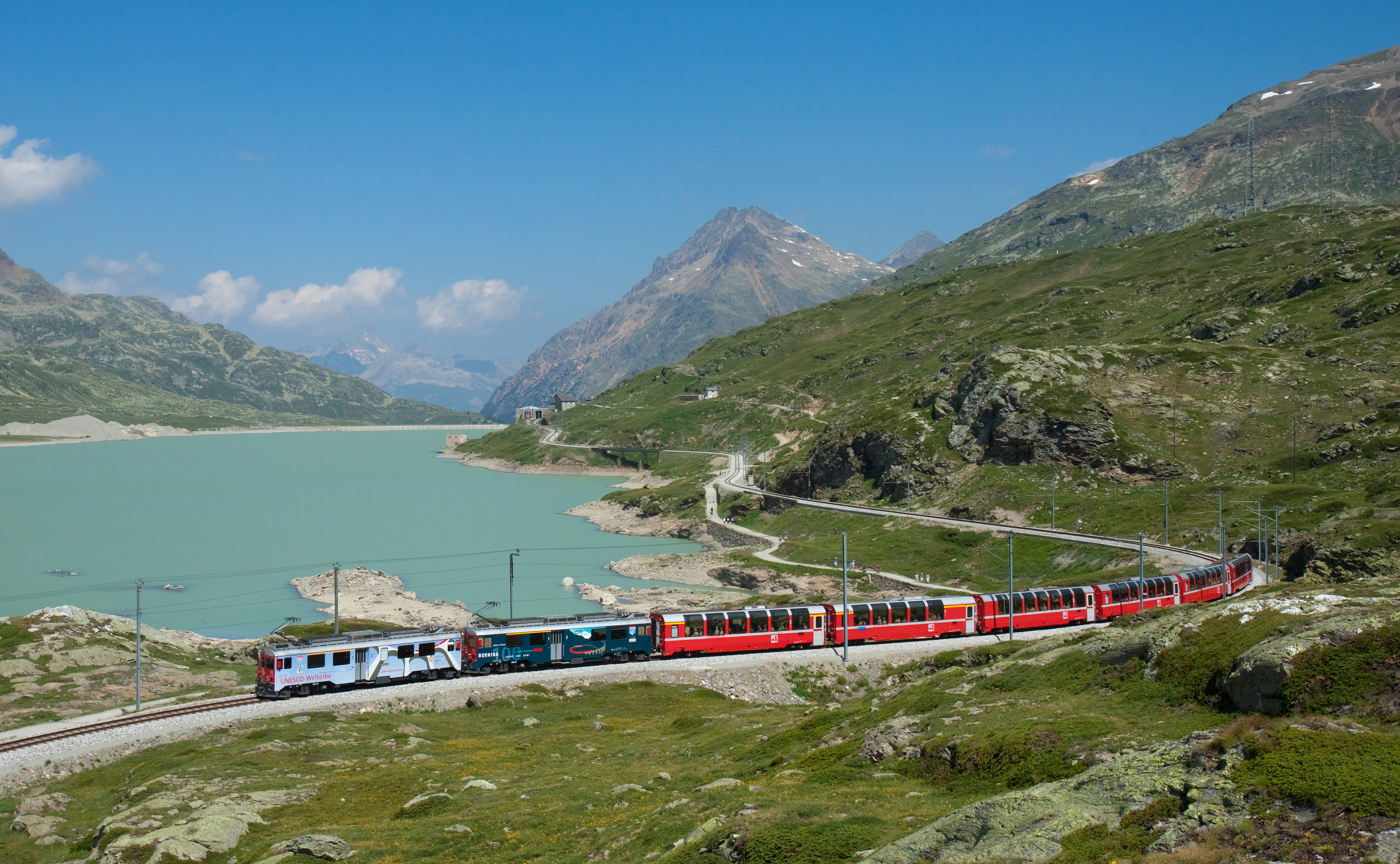
Bernina railway line passing by Lago Bianco in Switzerland.

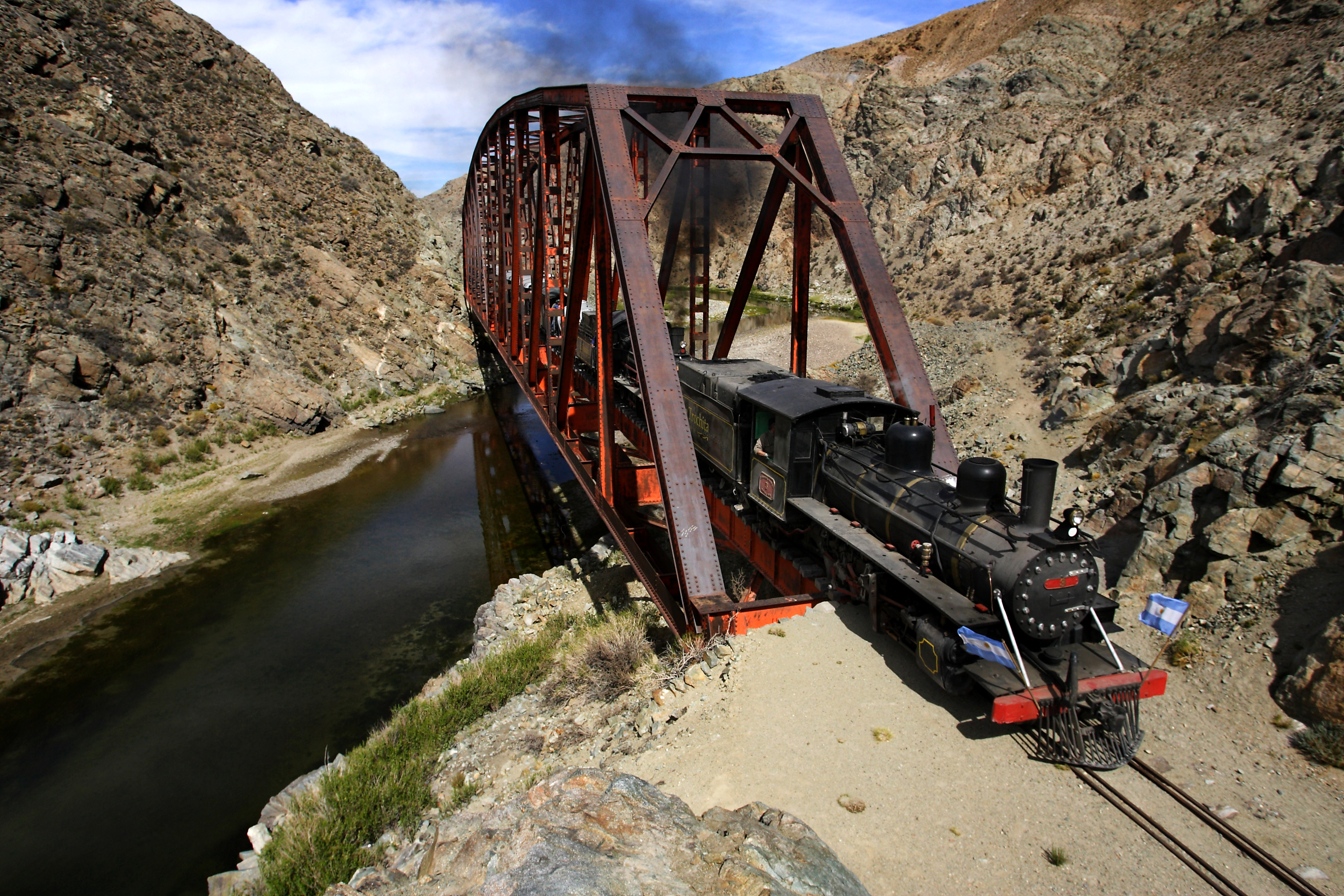
La Trochita crossing Río Chico in Argentina.

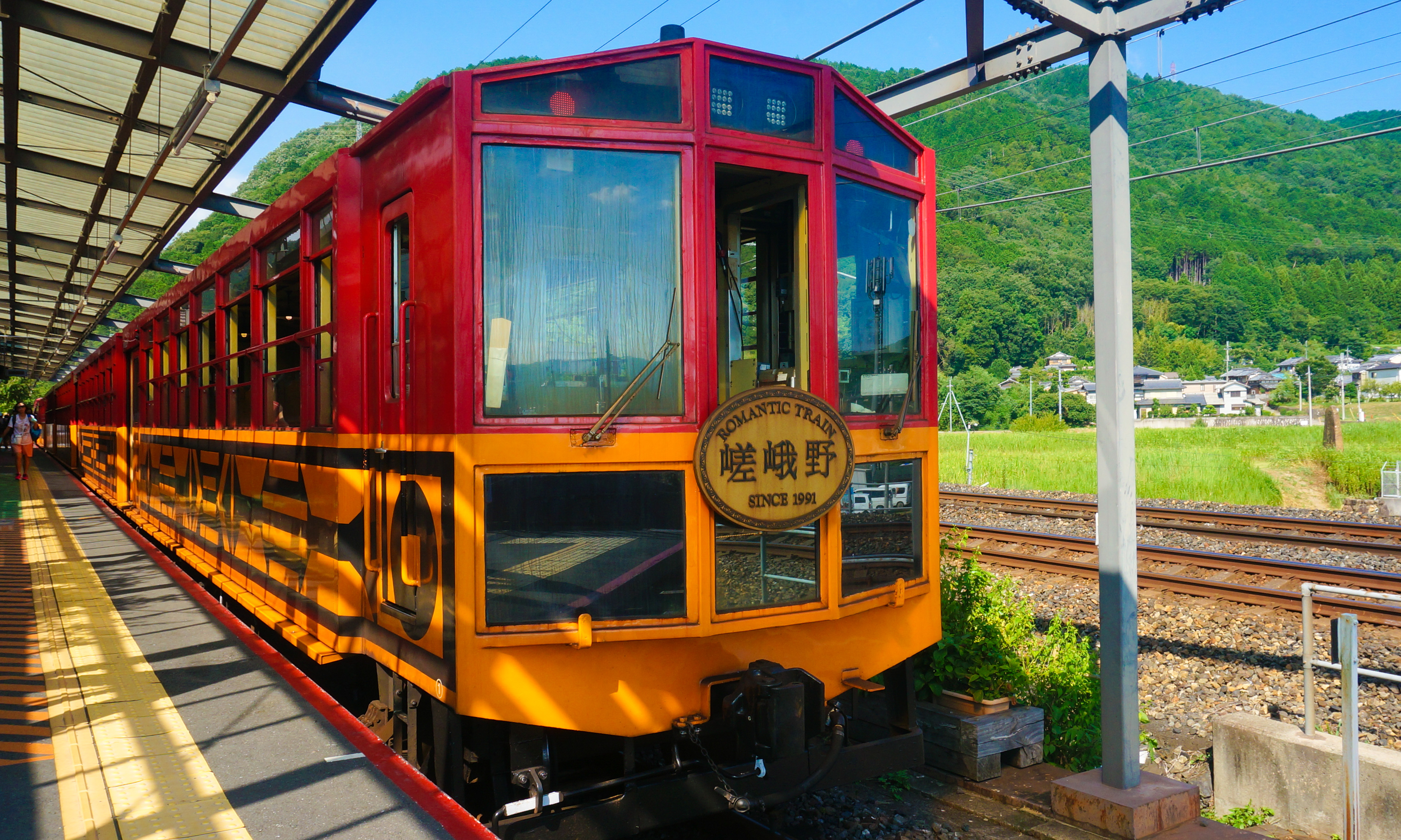
A train of the Sagano Scenic Railway in Japan.

This list of heritage railways includes heritage railways sorted by country, state, or region. A heritage railway is a preserved or tourist railroad which is run as a tourist attraction, is usually but not always run by volunteers, and often seeks to re-create railway scenes of the past.

== Europe ==
=== Austria ===
- Ampflwanger Bahn (Timelkam — Ampflwang)
- Bockerlbahn Bürmoos (narrow gauge, original tracks removed)
- Bregenzerwaldbahn (narrow gauge, remaining section Bezau — Schwarzenberg)
- Erzbergbahn (section Vordernberg — Eisenerz)
- Feistritztalbahn (narrow gauge, Weiz — Birkfeld)
- Gurktalbahn (narrow gauge, remaining section Treibach-Althofen — Pöckstein-Zwischenwässern)
- Höllental Railway (Lower Austria) (narrow gauge, Payerbach-Reichenau — Hirschwang an der Rax)
- Landesbahn Feldbach — Bad Gleichenberg (some regular service remains)
- Lavamünder Bahn (Lavamünd — St. Paul im Lavanttal, track removed)
- Lokalbahn Ebelsberg — St. Florian (narrow gauge, some sections removed)
- Lokalbahn Korneuburg — Hohenau (some sections)
- Lokalbahn Retz — Drosendorf
- Lokalbahn Weizelsdorf — Ferlach
- Internationale Rheinregulierungsbahn (narrow gauge, remaining section: new mouth of river Rhine into lake Constance — Lustenau depot; connection to Kadelberg quarry via Swiss side of Rhine now suspended)
- Rosen Valley Railway (section Weizelsdorf — Rosenbach)
- Stainzer Flascherlzug (narrow gauge, Stainz — Preding; service now suspended)
- Steyr Valley Railway (narrow gauge, remaining section Steyr — Grünburg)
- Taurachbahn (narrow gauge, section Tamsweg — Mauterndorf im Lungau of the Murtalbahn)
- Thörlerbahn (narrow gauge, originally Kapfenberg — Turnau, track removed)
- Wachauer Bahn (section Krems — Emmersdorf an der Donau of the Donauuferbahn)
- Waldviertler Schmalspurbahnen (narrow gauge, Gmünd — Groß Gerungs and Gmünd — Litschau / — Heidenreichstein)
- Ybbs Valley Railway (narrow gauge, remaining section Göstling — Lunz am See — Kienberg-Gaming)

=== Belgium ===
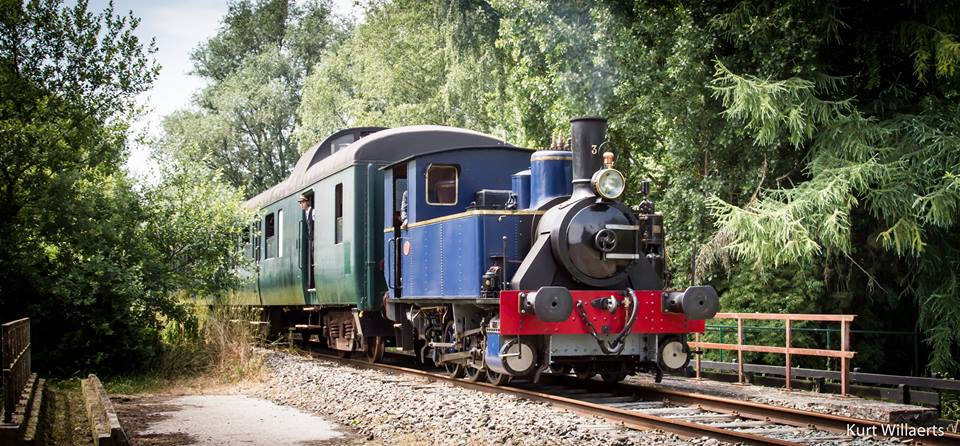
Steam loco Wase Kleiputter on the Dendermonde-Puurs Railway

- Chemin de Fer à vapeur des Trois Vallées
- Chemin de Fer du Bocq
- Dendermonde-Puurs Steam Railway
- Stoomcentrum Maldegem
- ASVi museum
- Vennbahn Closed in 2001

=== Bosnia and Herzegovina ===
- Sarajevo-Višegrad Railway (section from Višegrad to Vardište)

=== Czech Republic ===
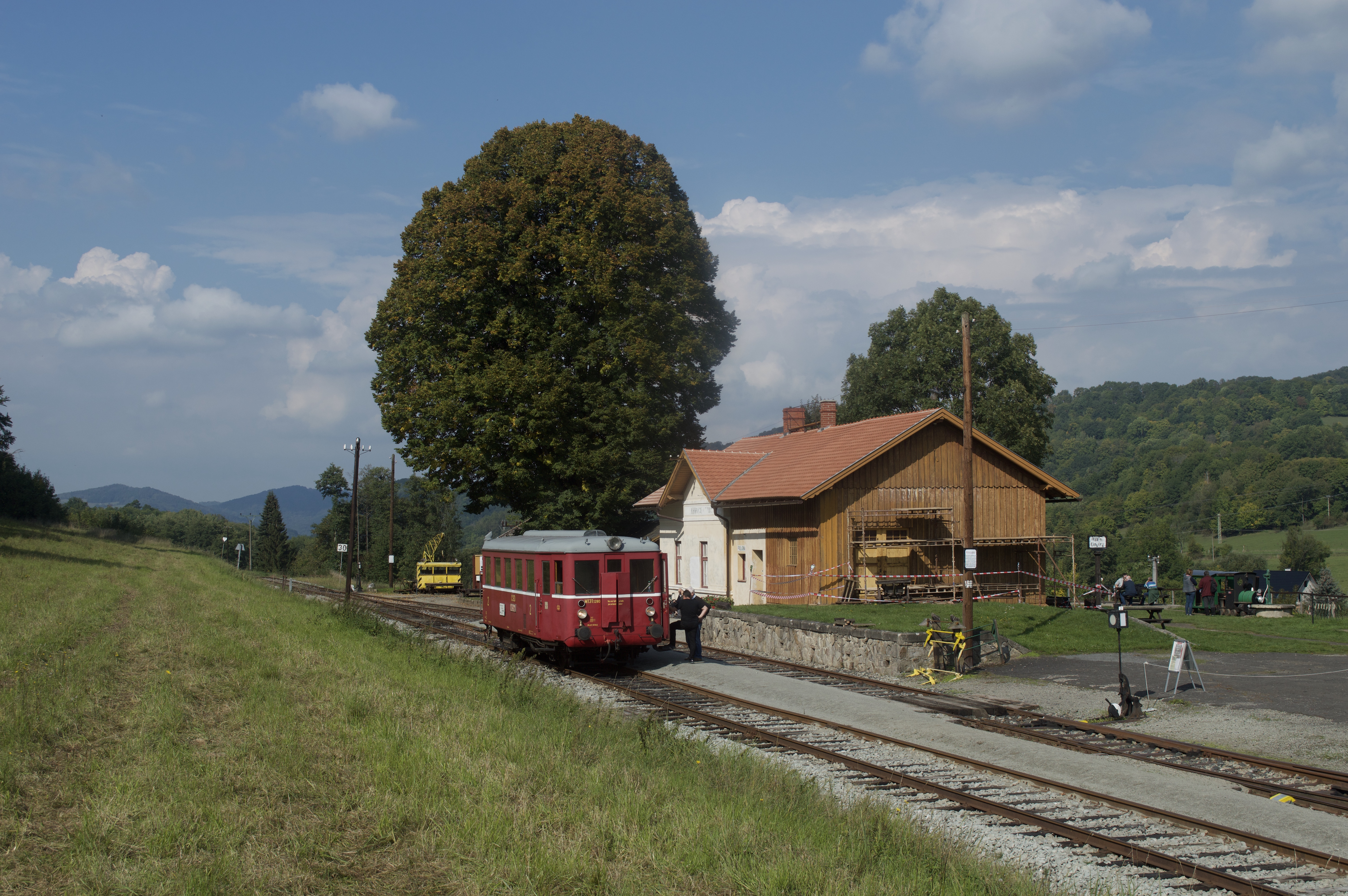
Historic railcar M131 in Zubrnice station

- Lužná u Rakovníka - Kolešovice Railway
- Tovačovka (Kroměříž) Kojetín - Tovačov)
- Zubrnická museální železnice ((Ústí nad Labem Střekov) - Velké Březno - Zubrnice)
- Břeclav - Lednice
- Hvozdnický Expres (Opava Východ - Svobodné Heřmanice)
- Bruntál - Malá Morávka
- Sklářská lokálka Šenovka (Česká Kamenice - Kamenický Šenov)
- Kozí dráha (Děčín - Telnice)

=== Denmark ===
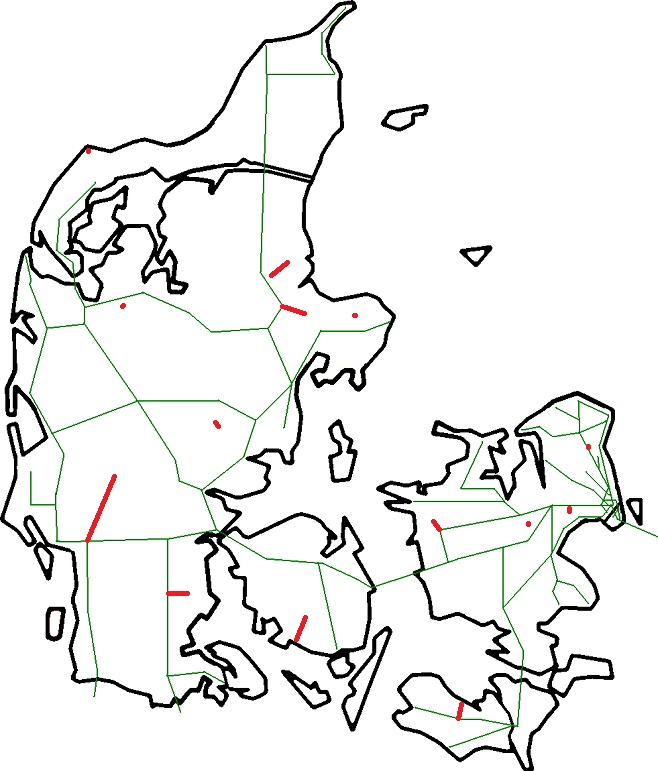
Danish heritage railways in 2012. Subsequently, operations on the Grindsted Line have been discontinued.

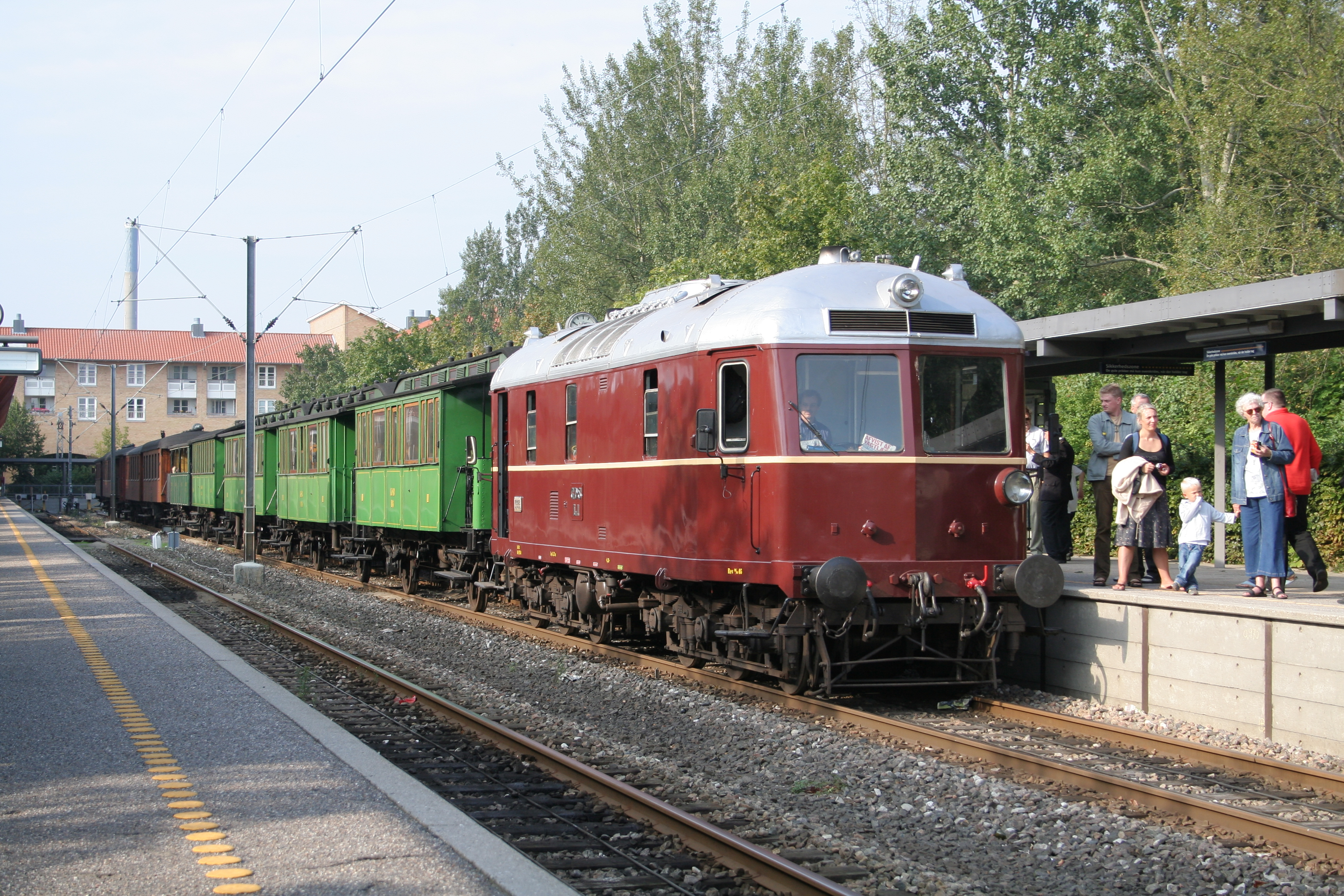
An NSJV restored train on the Nordsjællands Veterantog

- Aabenraa Veteranbane^{S}, Jylland
- Amtsbanen på Als / Ekleinbahn^{N}, Als, re-establish a 6 km section of the railway from Nordborg to Universe (Danish amusement park)
- Bevaringsforeningen Gedser Remise – roundhouse^{S}, Falster, DJK
- BjergBanen^{S} ^{H}, Jylland
- Blovstrødbanen ^{N}, Zealand, DJK
- Bornholms Railway Museum- narrow gauge, Bornholm, future re establish a section of the former Nexøbane
- Danish Railway Museum – Funen
- Djursland Railway Museum – Jylland, DJK
- Hanstholm fortress^{N}, Jylland
- Hedelands Veteranbane^{N}, Sjælland
- Hjerl Hede Frilandsmuseum^{N}, Jylland
- Limfjordsbanen^{H}, Jylland, DJK
- Mariager-Handest Veteranbane^{S}, Jylland, DJK
- Museumsbanen Maribo-Bandholm^{S}, Lolland, DJK
- MY-Veterantog^{H}, Sjælland, DJK
- Nordisk Jernbane-Klub^{H}, Falster, DJK
- Nordsjællands Veterantog^{H}, Sjælland
- Skjoldenæsholm Tram Museum – near Skjoldenæsholm Castle, Sjælland
- Stenvad Mosebrugcenter^{N}, Jylland
- Struer Jernbane-Klub^{H}, Jylland
- Struer Railway Museum- Jylland
- Sydfynske Veteranjernbane^{S}, Fyn
- Sydjyllands Veterantog^{H}, Jylland
- Vestsjællands Veterantog^{S}, Sjælland, DJK
- Veteranbanen Bryrup-Vrads^{S}, Jylland
- Veteranbanen Haderslev-Vojens^{S}, Jylland, DJK
- Veterantog Ves^{H}, Jylland, DJK
- Videbæk-Skjern Veteranbane^{S}, Jylland
- Østsjællandske Jernbaneklub^{H}, Sjælland

^{H} Heritage rail operator | ^{N} Narrow gauge railway | ^{S} Standard gauge railway
DJK: Dansk Jernbane-Klub. Several heritage railways and operators are members of DJK

=== Finland ===
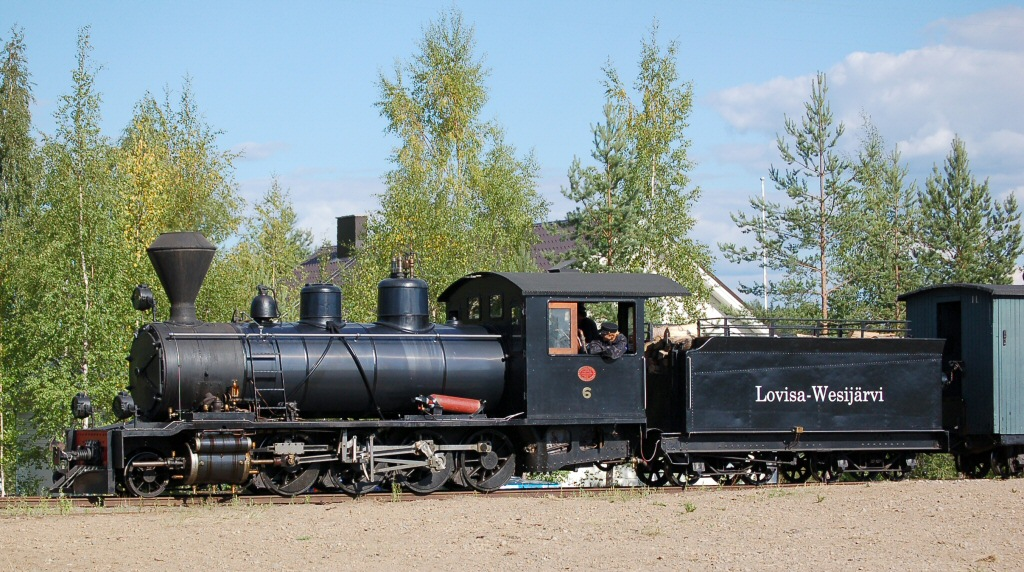
Lovisa & Wesijärvi Railway #6 at the Jokioinen Museum Railway

- Jokioinen Museum Railway
- Kovjoki Museum Railway
- Porvoo Museum Railway

=== France ===
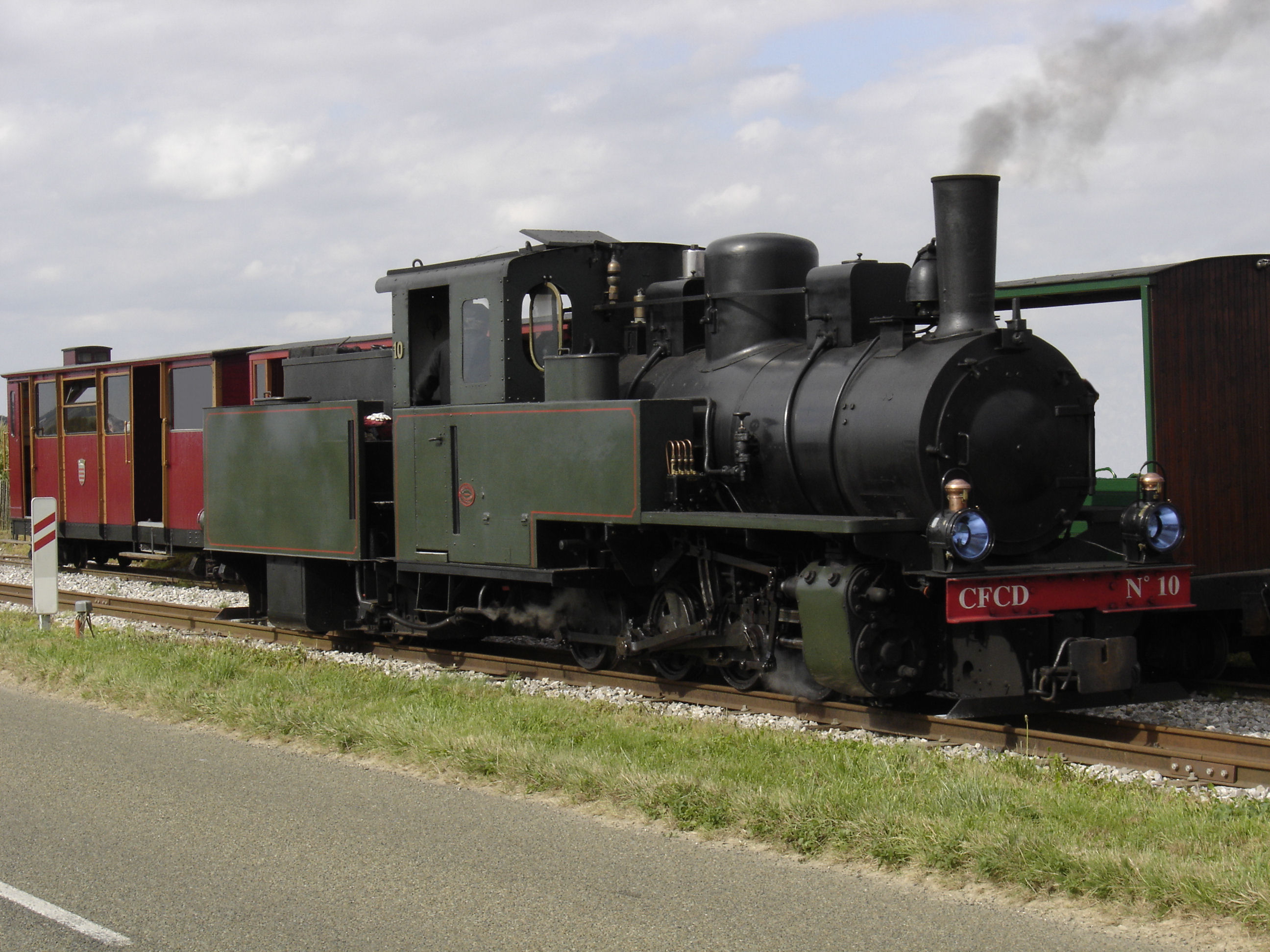
The Froissy Dompierre Light Railway

- List of tourist railways in France

=== Germany ===
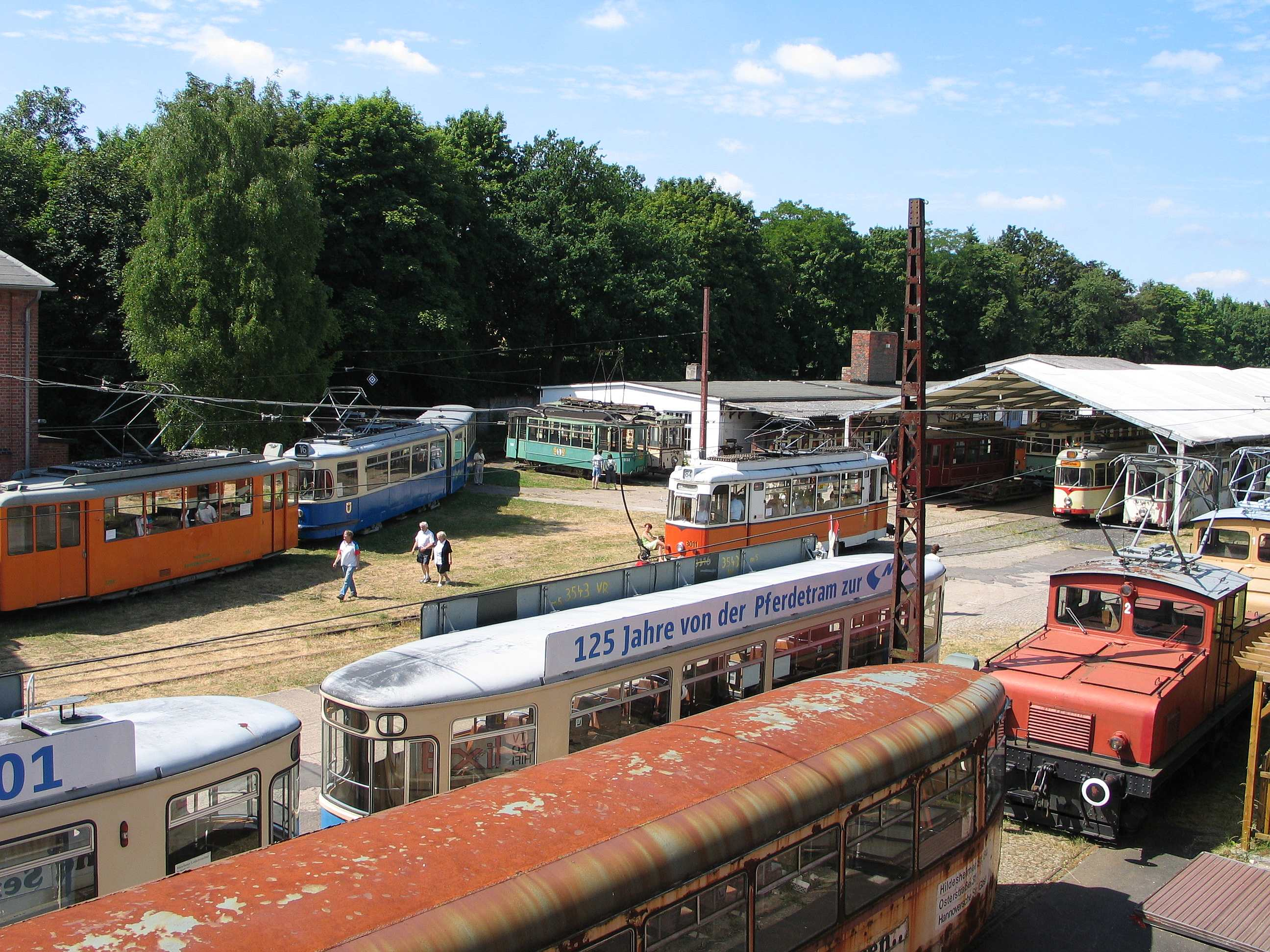
The Hannoversches Straßenbahn-Museum

- Albbähnle
- Amstetten–Gerstetten line
- Augsburg Railway Park
- Bäderbahn Molli
- Bavarian Localbahn Society
- Bergische Museumsbahn
- Bochum-Dahlhausen Railway Museum
- Dampfbahn Fränkische Schweiz
- DBK Historic Railway
- Dieringhausen Railway Museum
- Döllnitzbahn
- Eisenbahnfreunde Zollernbahn
- Ettlingen–Bad Herrenalb line
- Etzwilen–Singen railway
- Franconian Museum Railway
- Frankfurt City Junction Line
- German Steam Locomotive Museum
- Hannoversches Straßenbahn-Museum
- Historic Railway, Frankfurt
- Karlsruhe–Baiersbronn line
- Kleinbahn-Museum Bruchhausen-Vilsen
- Kuckucksbähle
- Mellrichstadt–Fladungen line
- Mügeln railway network
- Nördlingen–Feuchtwangen line
- Nördlingen–Gunzenhausen line
- Radebeul–Radeburg line
- Riedlhütte narrow-gauge railway
- Wutach Valley Railway (Sauschwänzlebahn)

=== Greece ===
- Diakofto–Kalavryta Railway
- Pelion railway
- Treno sto Rouf Railway Carriage Theater

=== Hungary ===
- Children's Railway, Gyermekvasút

=== Italy ===
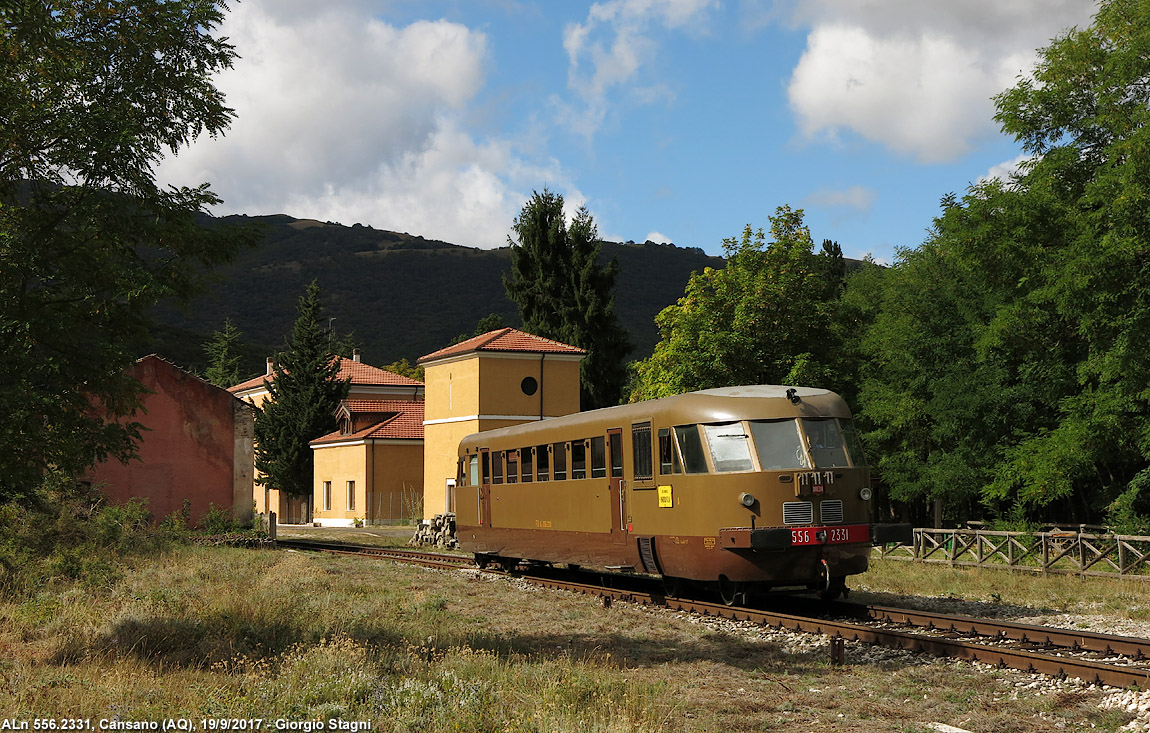
Historic train at the Cansano railway station, along the now tourist Sulmona–Isernia railway in Italy.

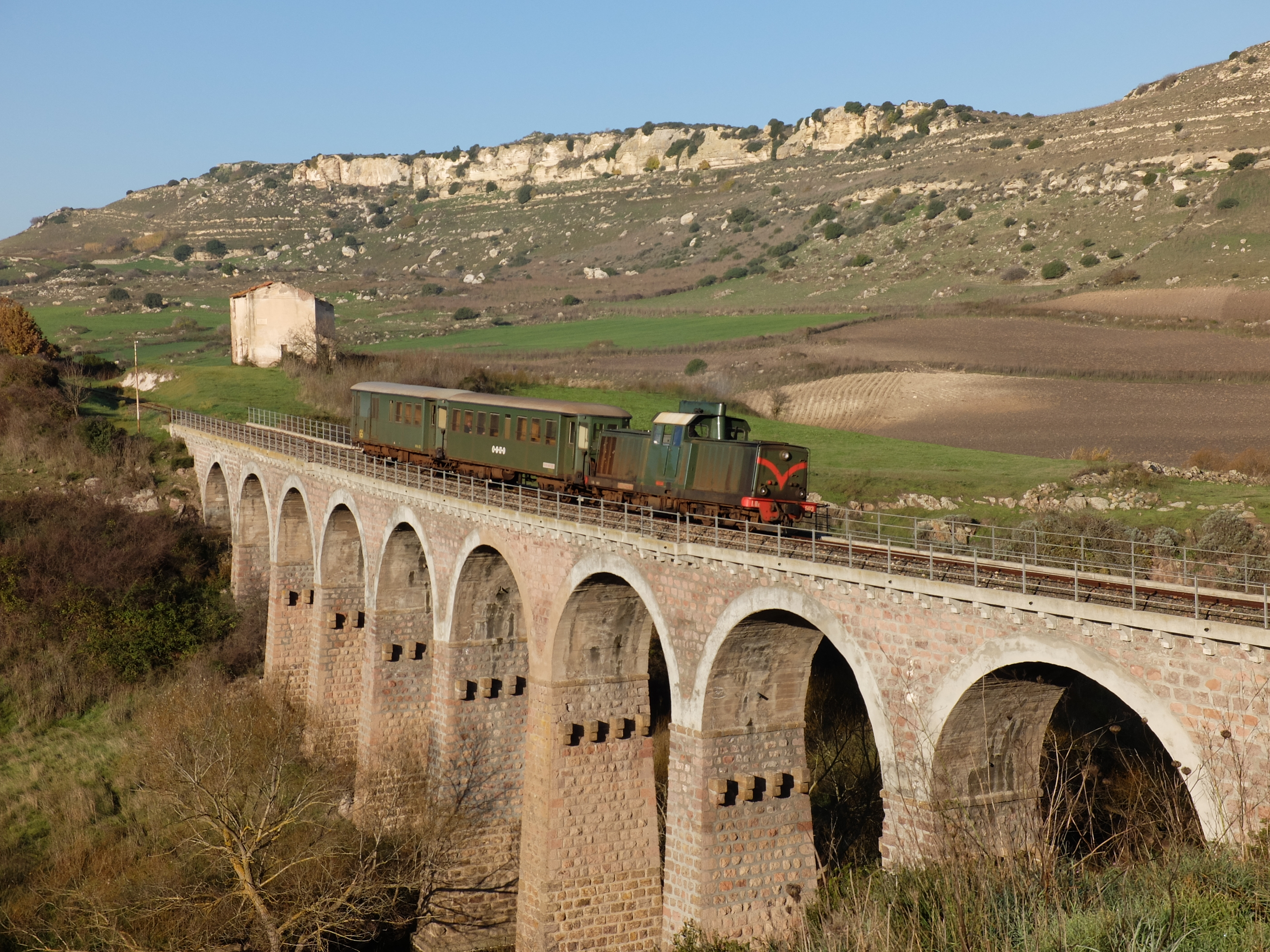
Tourist train in transit on a viaduct of the Sassari–Tempio–Palau railway in Italy

- Bernina Railway, in the Rhaetian Railway between Italy and Switzerland; inscribed in the World Heritage List of UNESCO
- Valmorea railway
- Sulmona–Isernia railway
- Cosenza-Camigliatello–San Giovanni in Fiore railway
- Avellino–Rocchetta Sant'Antonio railway
- Gemona del Friuli–Sacile railway
- Palazzolo–Paratico railway
- Ceva–Ormea railway
- Mandas–Arbatax railway
- Isili–Sorgono railway
- Sassari–Tempio-Palau railway
- Macomer–Bosa railway
- Alcantara–Randazzo railway
- Castelvetrano–Porto Empedocle railway
- Noto–Pachino railway
- Asciano–Monte Antico railway
- Civitavecchia–Orte railway
- Fano–Urbino railway
- Chivasso–Asti railway
- Castagnole–Asti-Mortara railway
- Alessandria–Cavallermaggiore railway
- Novara–Varallo railway
- Urbino–Fabriano railway
- Sicignano degli Alburni–Lagonegro railway
- Rocchetta Sant'Antonio–Gioia del Colle railway
- Cuneo–Mondovì railway

=== Latvia ===
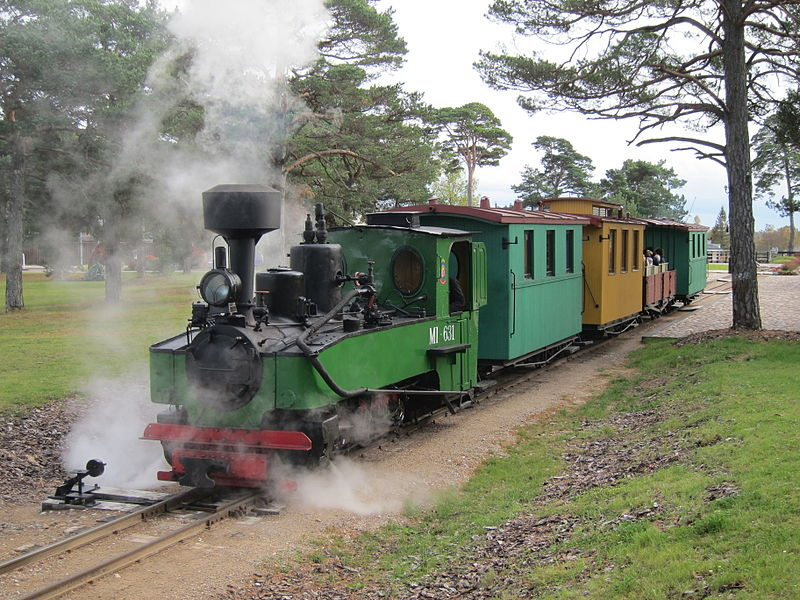
Ventspils narrow-gauge railway

- Gulbene-Alūksne railway
- Ventspils narrow-gauge railway

=== Luxembourg ===
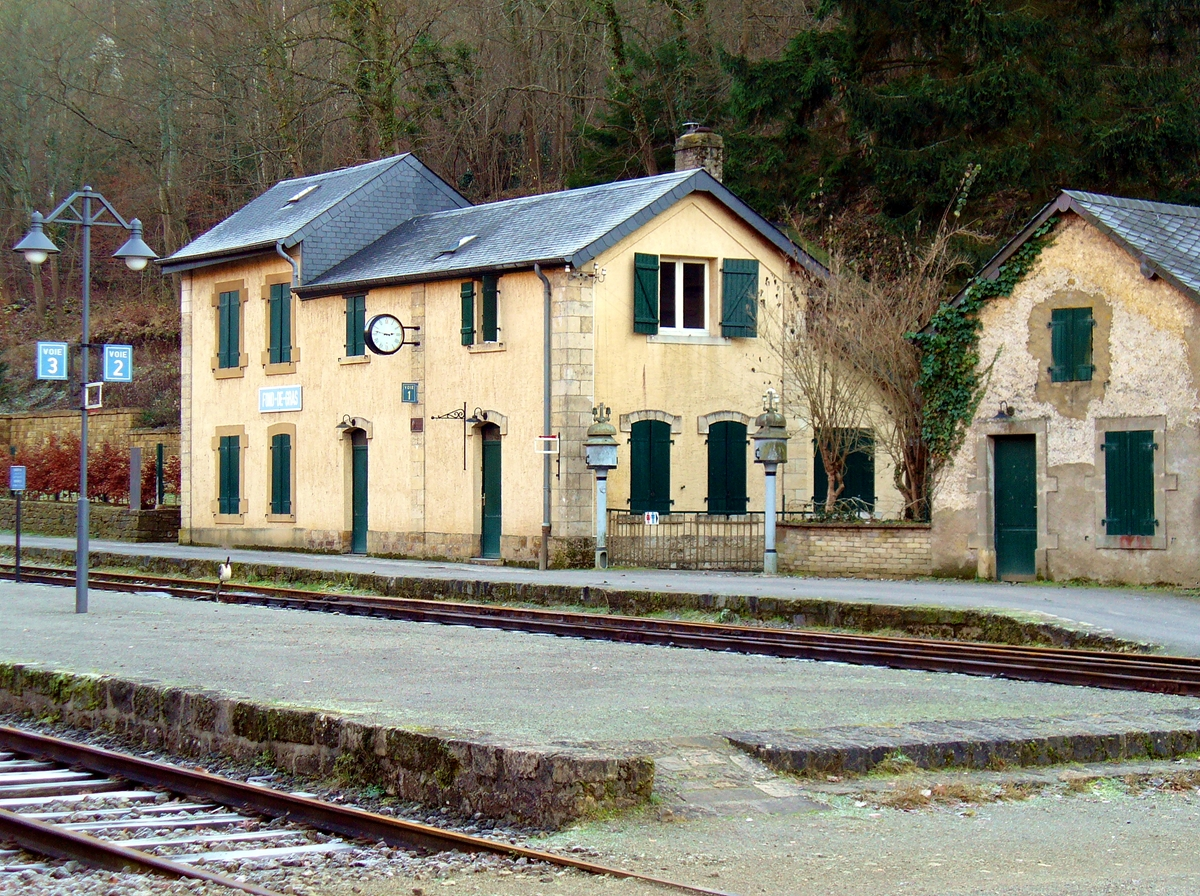
Fond de Gras railway station, Luxembourg

- Train 1900

=== Netherlands ===
- Corus Stoom IJmuiden
- Efteling Steam Train Company
- Museum Buurtspoorweg
- Steamtrain Hoorn Medemblik
- Stichting Stadskanaal Rail
- Stichting voorheen RTM
- Stoom Stichting Nederland
- Stoomtrein Goes - Borsele
- Stoomtrein Valkenburgse Meer
- Veluwse Stoomtrein Maatschappij
- Zuid-Limburgse Stoomtrein Maatschappij

=== Norway ===
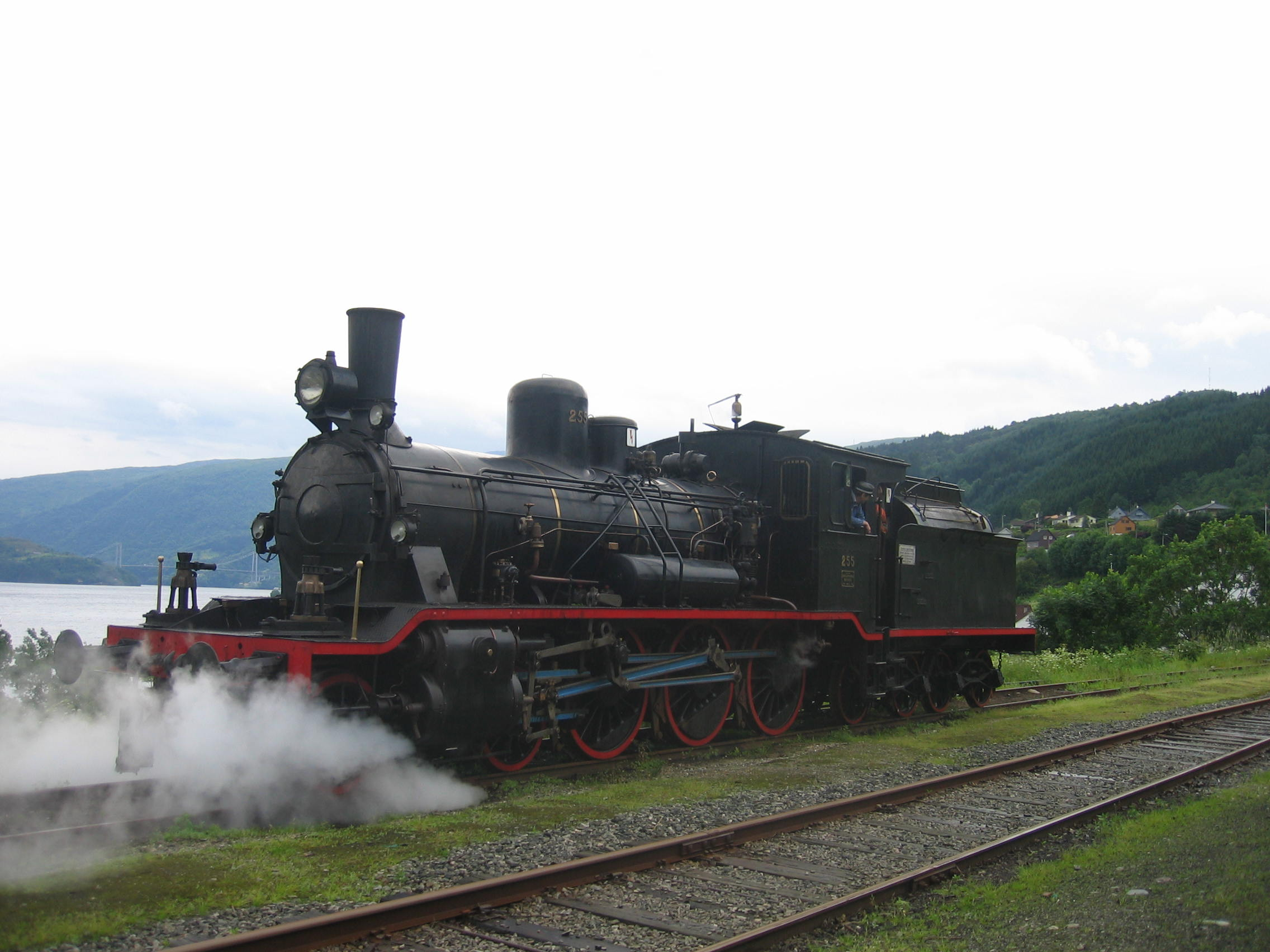
Steam locomotive on the Gamle Vossebanen

- Old Voss Line
- Krøderen Line
- Nesttun–Os Line
- Norwegian Railway Museum in Hamar
- Rjukan Line
- Setesdal Line
- Thamshavn Line
- Urskog–Høland Line
- Valdres Line

=== Poland ===
- Bieszczady Forest Railway
- Narrow Gauge Railway Museum in Sochaczew
- Narrow Gauge Railway Museum in Wenecja
- Seaside Narrow Gauge Railway
- Wigry Forest Railway

=== Portugal ===
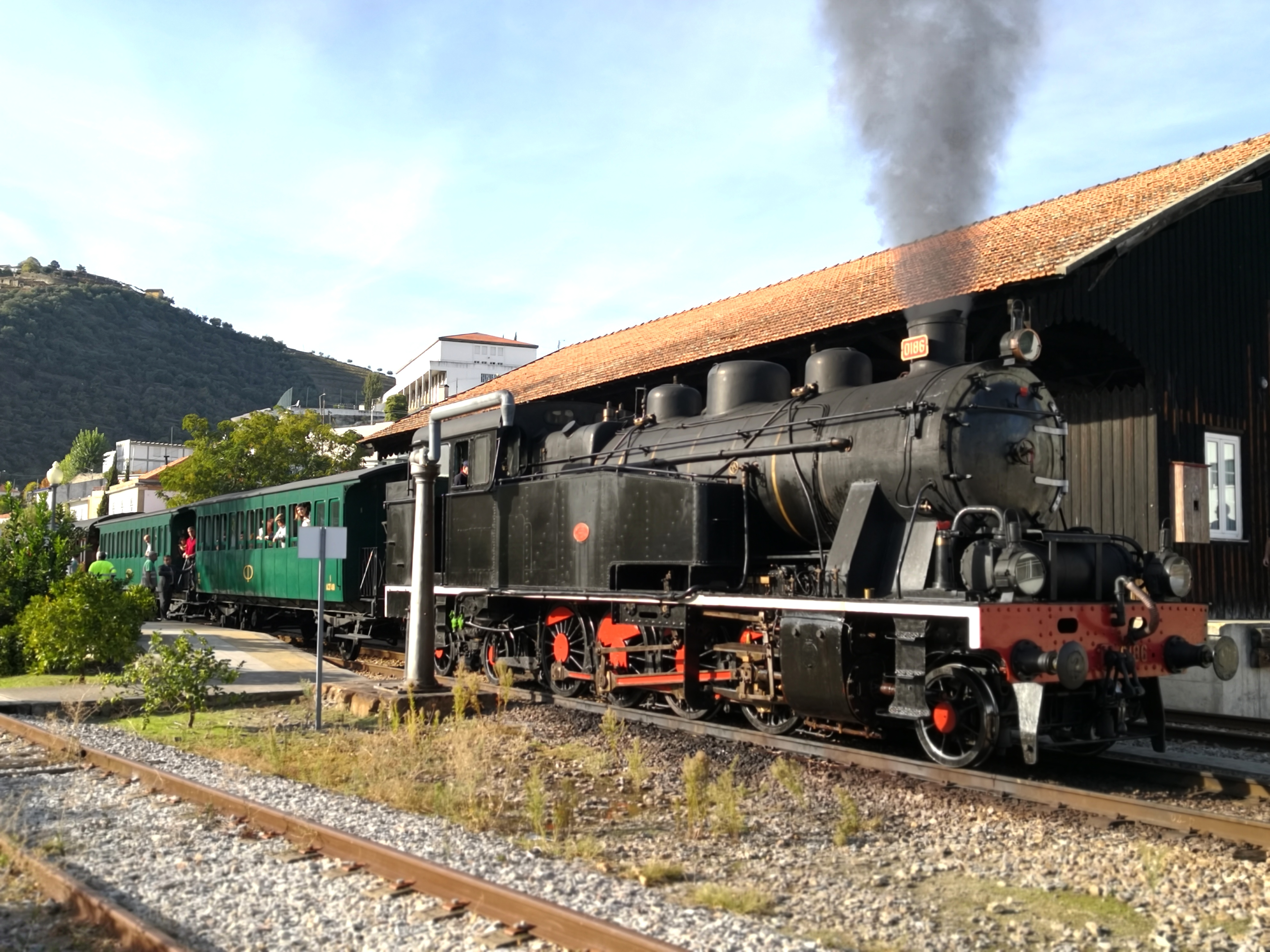
Comboio Histórico do Douro

- Barca d'Alva–La Fuente de San Esteban railway
- Corgo line
- Linha do Douro
- Sabor line
- Tâmega line
- Linha do Tua
- National Railway Museum (Portugal)
- Narrow-gauge railways in Portugal
- Monte Railway (Funchal, Madeira)

=== Romania ===
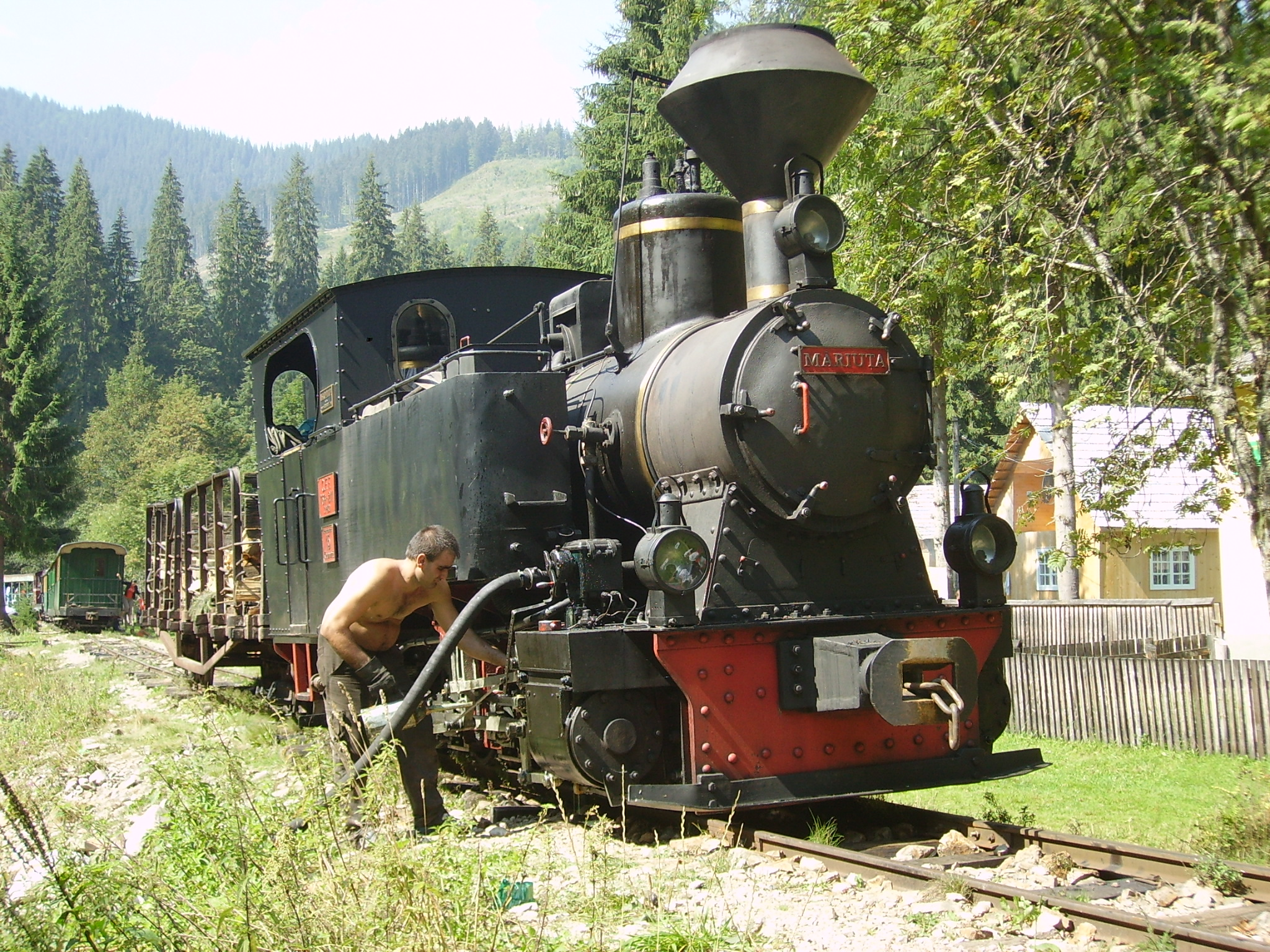
Locomotive Mariuţa on the Vişeu de Sus Railway

- Mocăniţa from Vasser Valley, Maramureş (CFF Vişeu de Sus)
- Sibiu to Agnita narrow-gauge line in Hârtibaciu Valley

=== San Marino ===
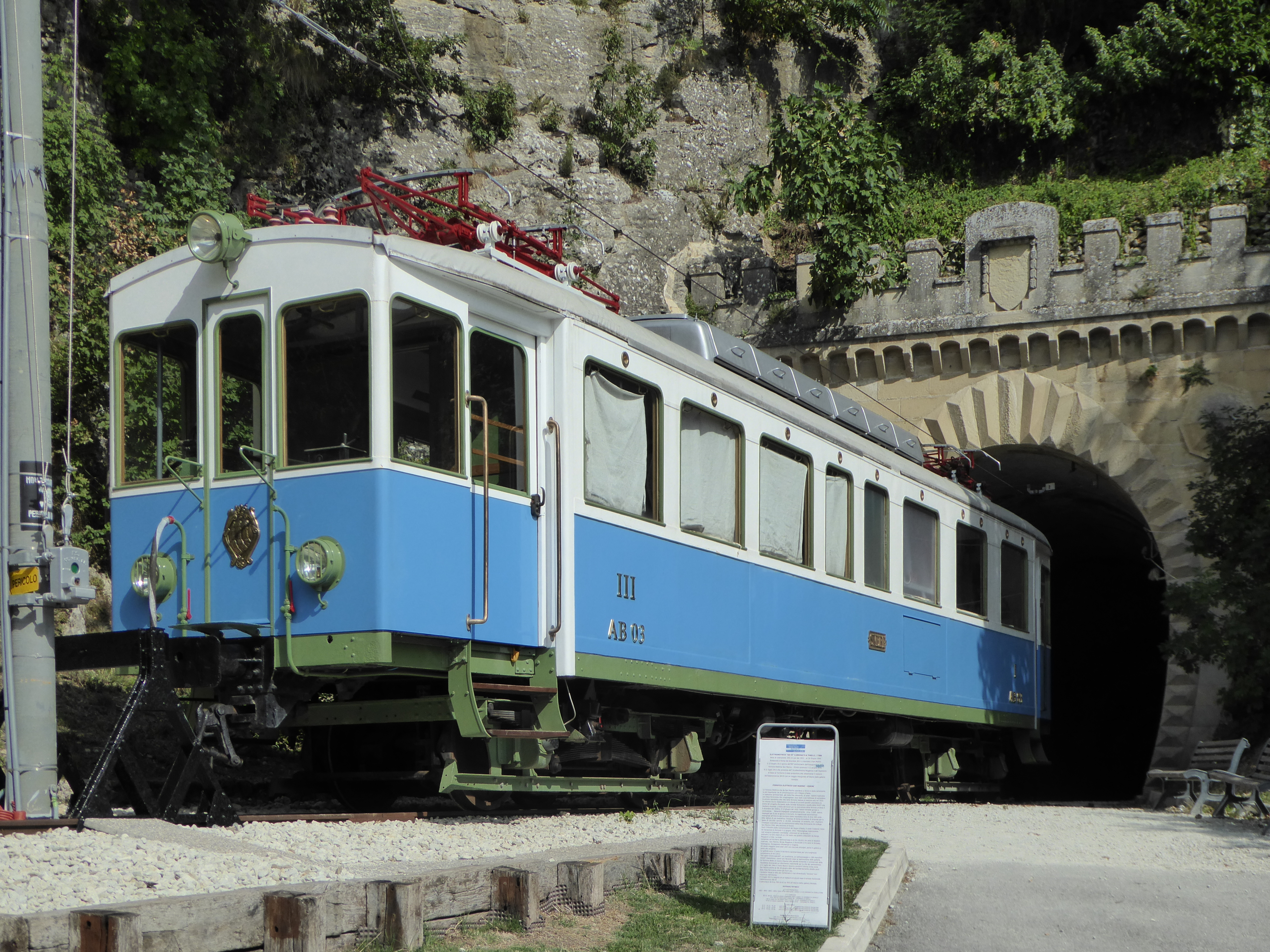
Restored AB 03 electric car in front of the Montale tunnel near the San Marino terminal station (2015)

- Ferrovia Rimini–San Marino (In 2012, 800 meters of the track was reconstructed and opened to service at the San Marino terminal station with the original train as a tourist attraction.)

=== Serbia ===
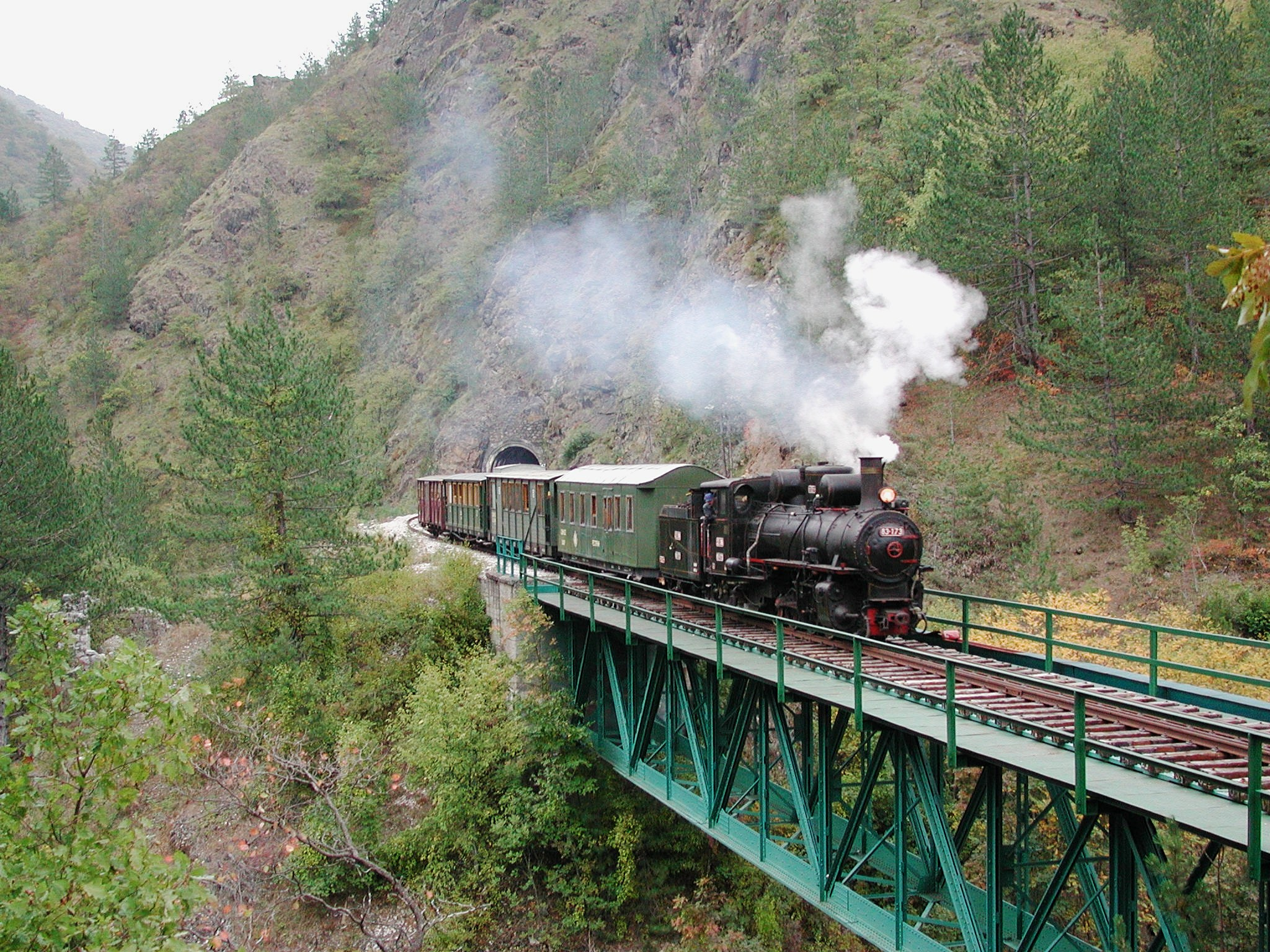
Train crossing the largest bridge on the Šargan Eight railway

- Šargan Eight

=== Slovakia ===
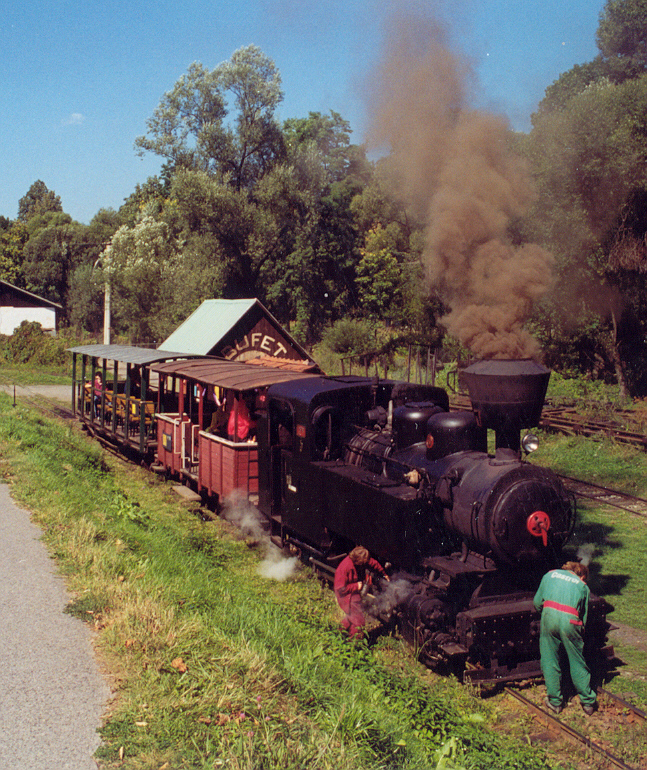
A train on the Čierny Hron Railway

- Čierny Hron Railway
- The Historical Logging Switchback Railway in Vychylovka, Kysuce near Nová Bystrica (Historická lesná úvraťová železnica)

=== Spain ===
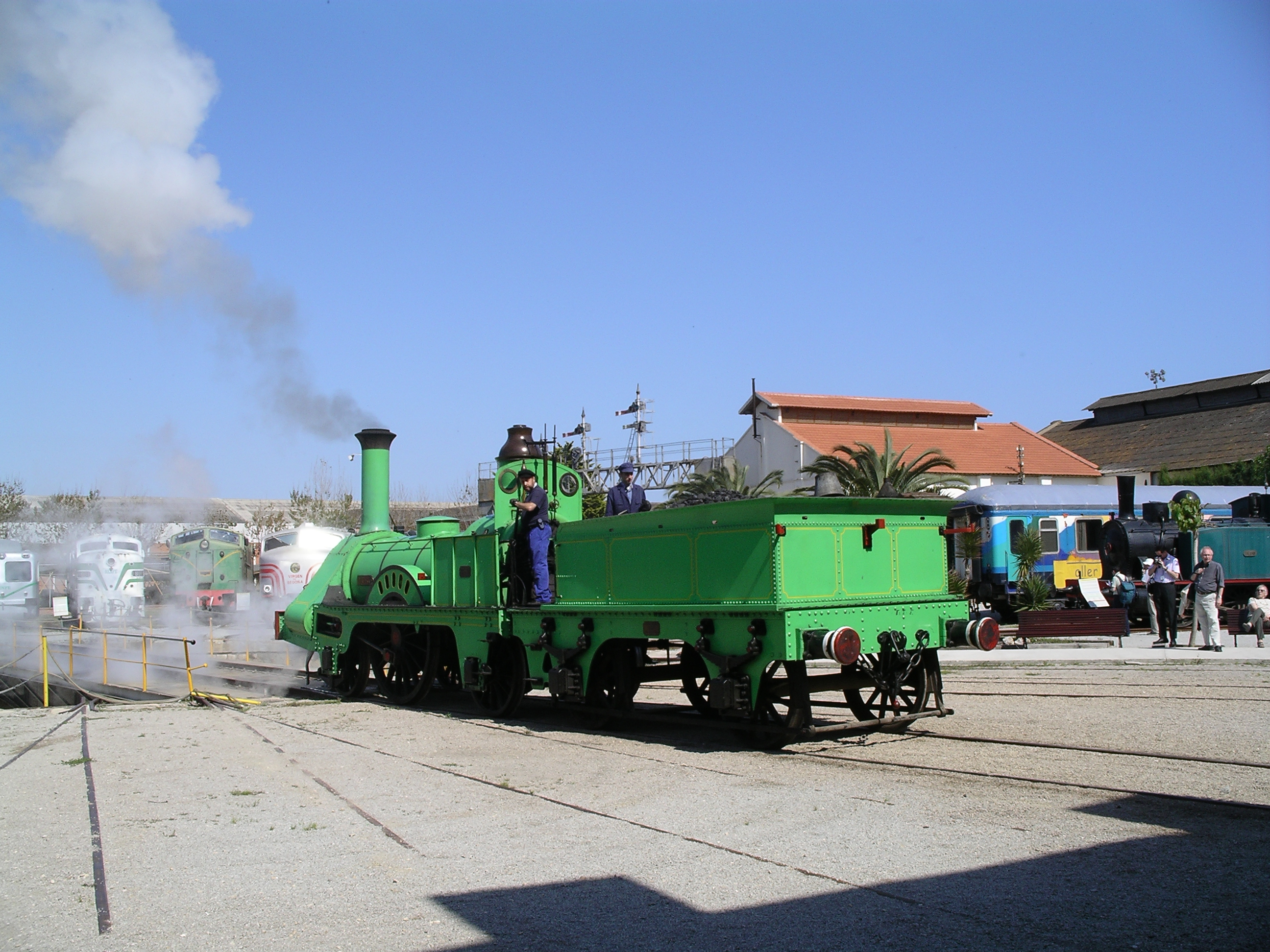
Steam locomotive "Tren del centenari" from 1948, in Vilanova Railway Museum

- Basque Railway Museum (steam railway tours)
- Gijón Railway Museum
- Philip II Train, service between Madrid and El Escorial
- Railway Museum in Móra la Nova
- Railway Museum in Vilanova (close to Barcelona)
- Strawberry train, seasonal service between Madrid and Aranjuez
- Tramvia Blau, Barcelona
- Tren dels Llacs, seasonal service between Lleida and La Pobla de Segur

=== Sweden ===
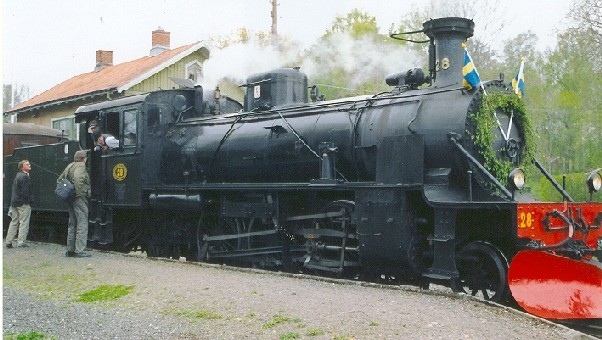
SRJ 28 Stortysken at Lenna Station (in Länna) on the Upsala-Lenna Jernväg railway

- Anten-Gräfsnäs Järnväg – narrow gauge, near Gothenburg
- Association of Narrow Gauge Railways Växjö-Västervik – narrow gauge (includes a section of mixed gauge track into Västervik)
- Böda Skogsjärnväg – narrow gauge, Öland
- Dal-Västra Värmlands Järnväg – standard gauge, Värmland
- Djurgården Line (tramway) – Stockholm
- Engelsberg-Norbergs Railway – standard gauge, Västmanland
- Gotlands Hesselby Jernväg – narrow gauge, Gotland
- Jädraås-Tallås Järnväg – narrow gauge, Gästrikland
- Ohsabanan – narrow gauge, Jönköping
- Risten–Lakvik Museum Railway – narrow gauge, Östergötland
- Skara – Lundsbrunns Järnvägar – narrow gauge, Västra Götaland County
- Skånska Järnvägar – standard gauge, Skåne
- Smalspårsjärnvägen Hultsfred-Västervik – narrow gauge, Småland
- Upsala-Lenna Jernväg – narrow gauge, Upsala County
- Östra Södermanlands Järnväg – narrow gauge, Södermanland

=== Switzerland ===
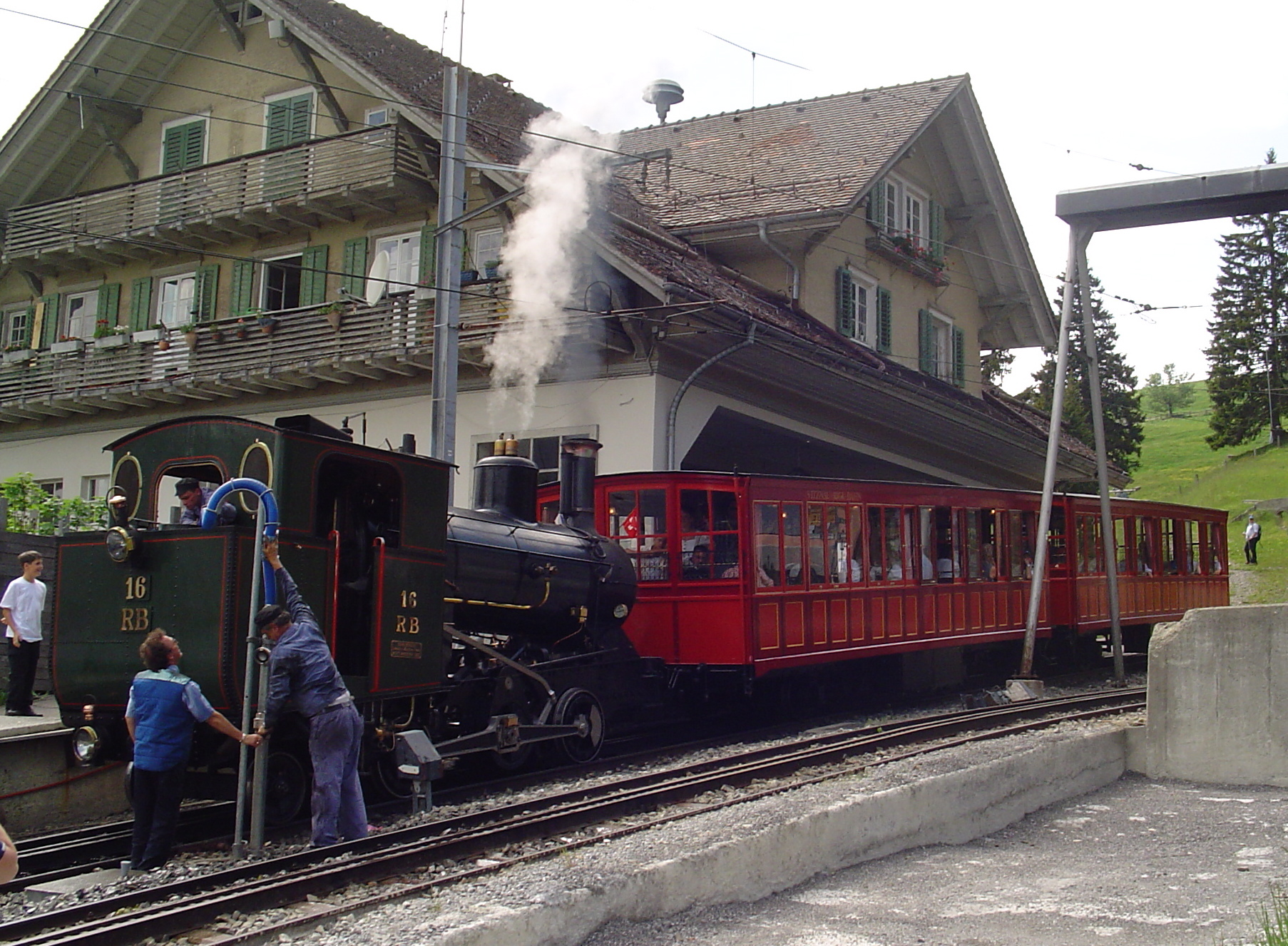
Historic steam on the Rigi Railways, the oldest rack railway in Europe

- Blonay-Chamby Museum Railway
- Brienz Rothorn Bahn
- Dampfbahn-Verein Zürcher Oberland
- Etzwilen–Singen railway
- Furka Cogwheel Steam Railway
- Furka Oberalp Railway
- Pilatus Railway
- Rigi Railways
- Schynige Platte Railway
- Zürcher Museums-Bahn
- La Traction
- Sursee–Triengen Railway
- Schinznacher Baumschulbahn

=== United Kingdom and Crown dependencies ===
==== England ====
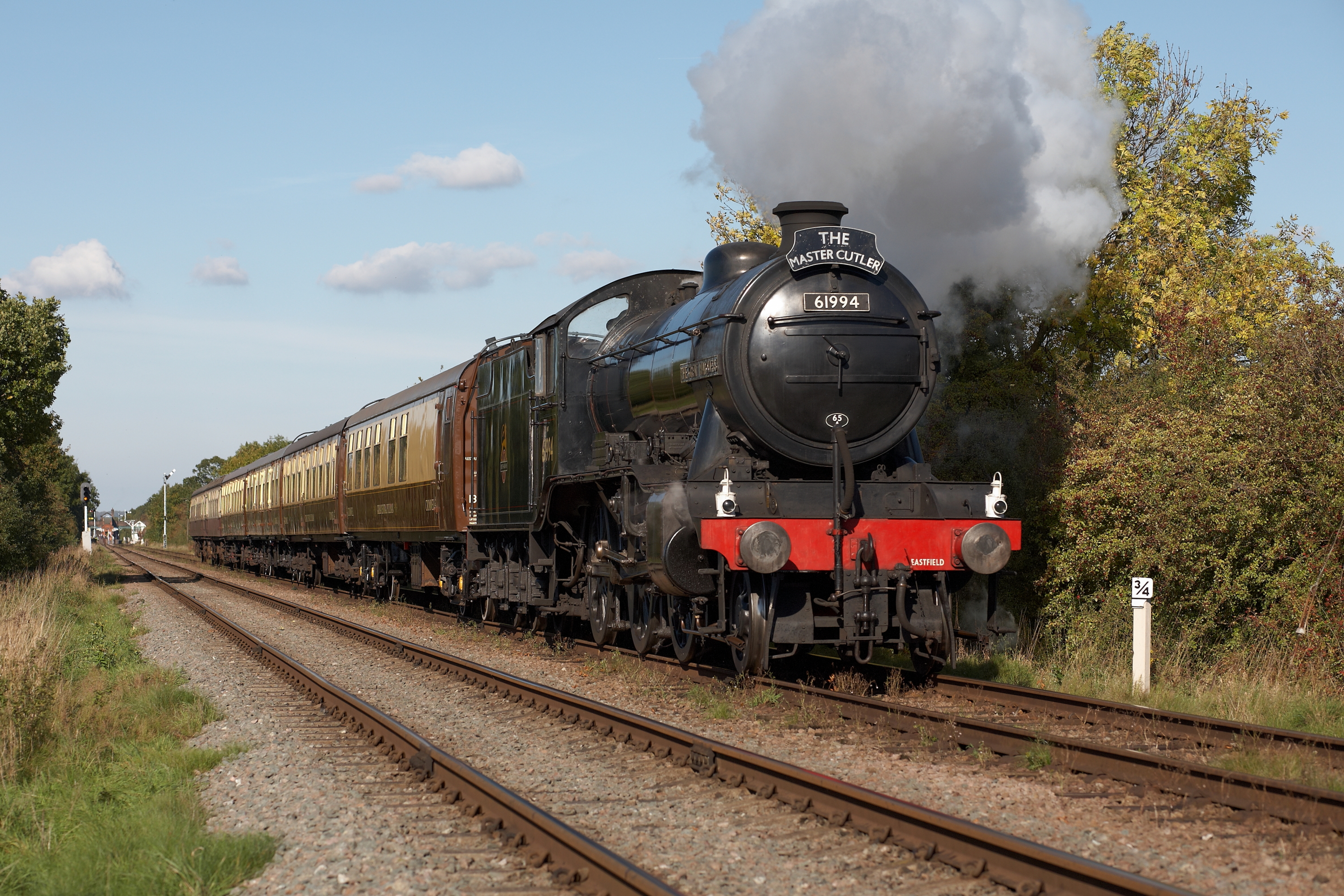
The Great Marquess" Great Central Railway

==== Scotland ====
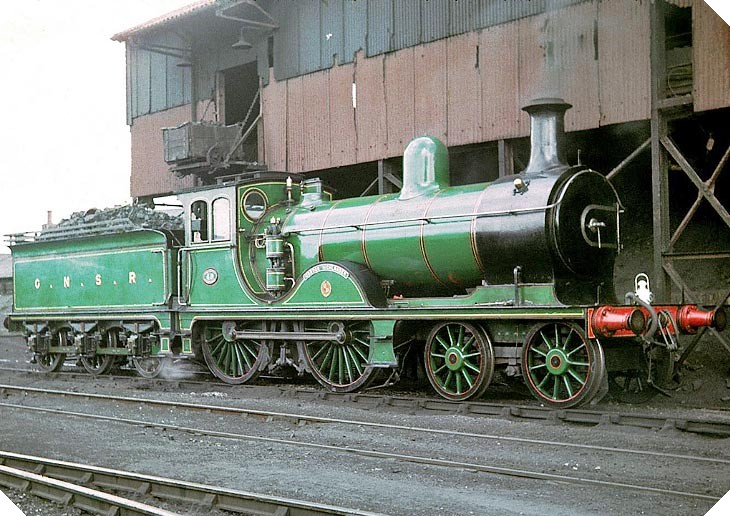
Gordon Highlander steam locomotive - Great North of Scotland Railway

==== Wales ====
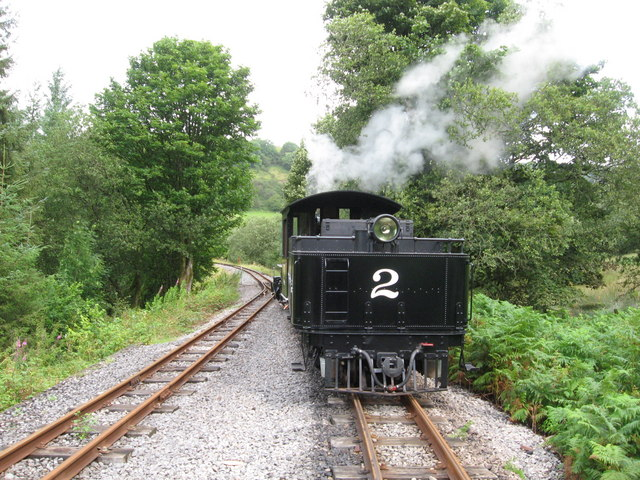
Brecon Mountain Railway

==== Northern Ireland ====
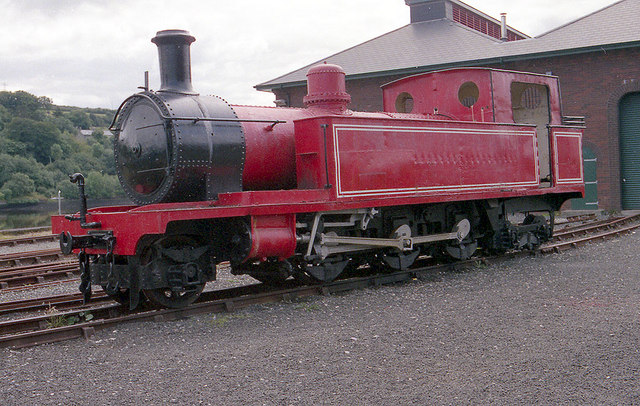
Outside the Foyle Valley Railway Museum

==== Isle of Man ====
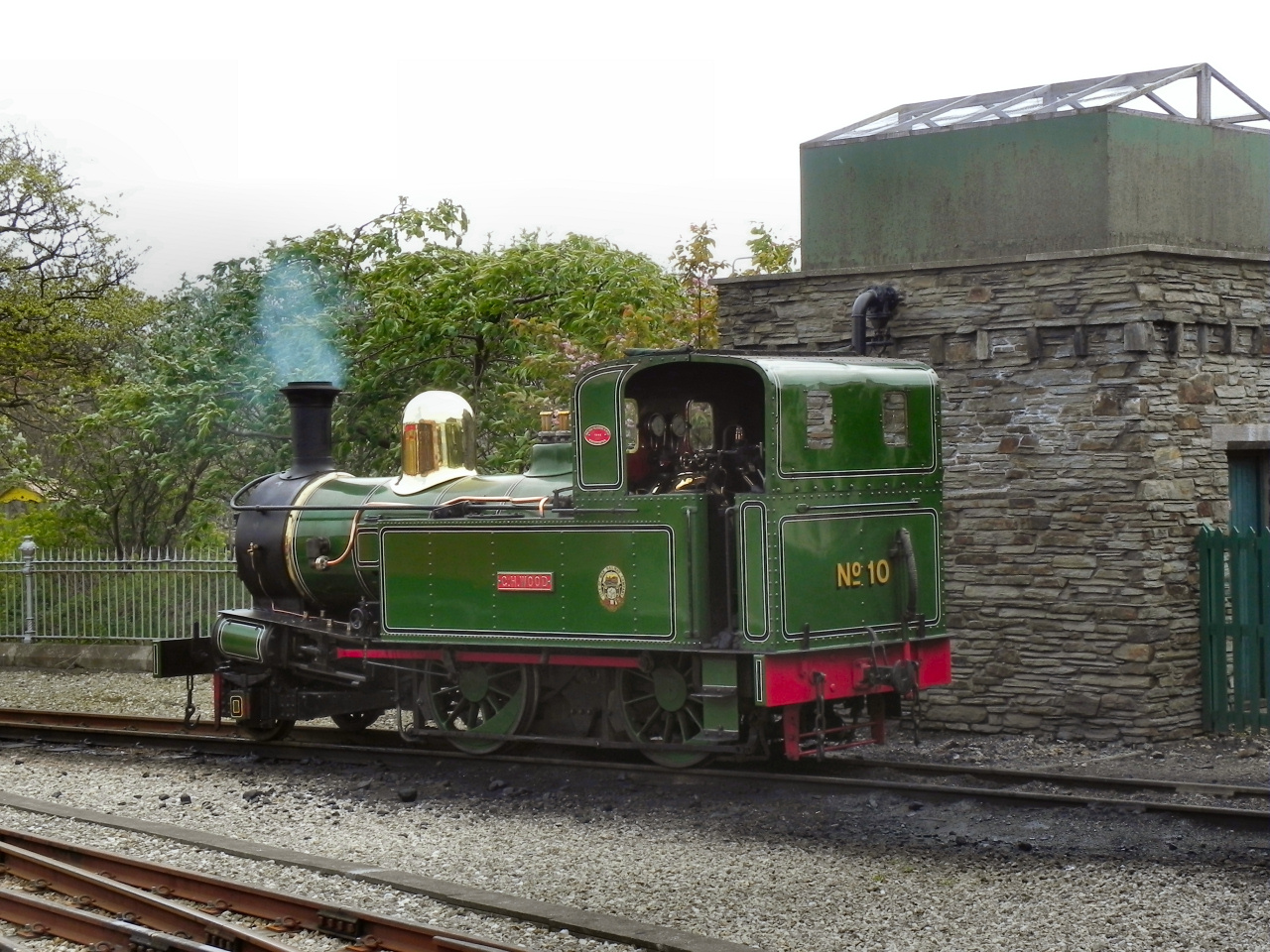
Isle of Man Steam Railway

==== Channel Islands ====
- Alderney Railway
- Pallot Heritage Steam Museum

== North America ==
=== Mexico ===
- Chihuahua al Pacífico (Copper Canyon)
- Ferrocarril Interoceanico
- Tequila Express

=== Barbados ===
- St. Nicholas Abbey Heritage Railway

=== St. Kitts ===
- St. Kitts Scenic Railway (Over historic tracks)

== South America ==
=== Argentina ===
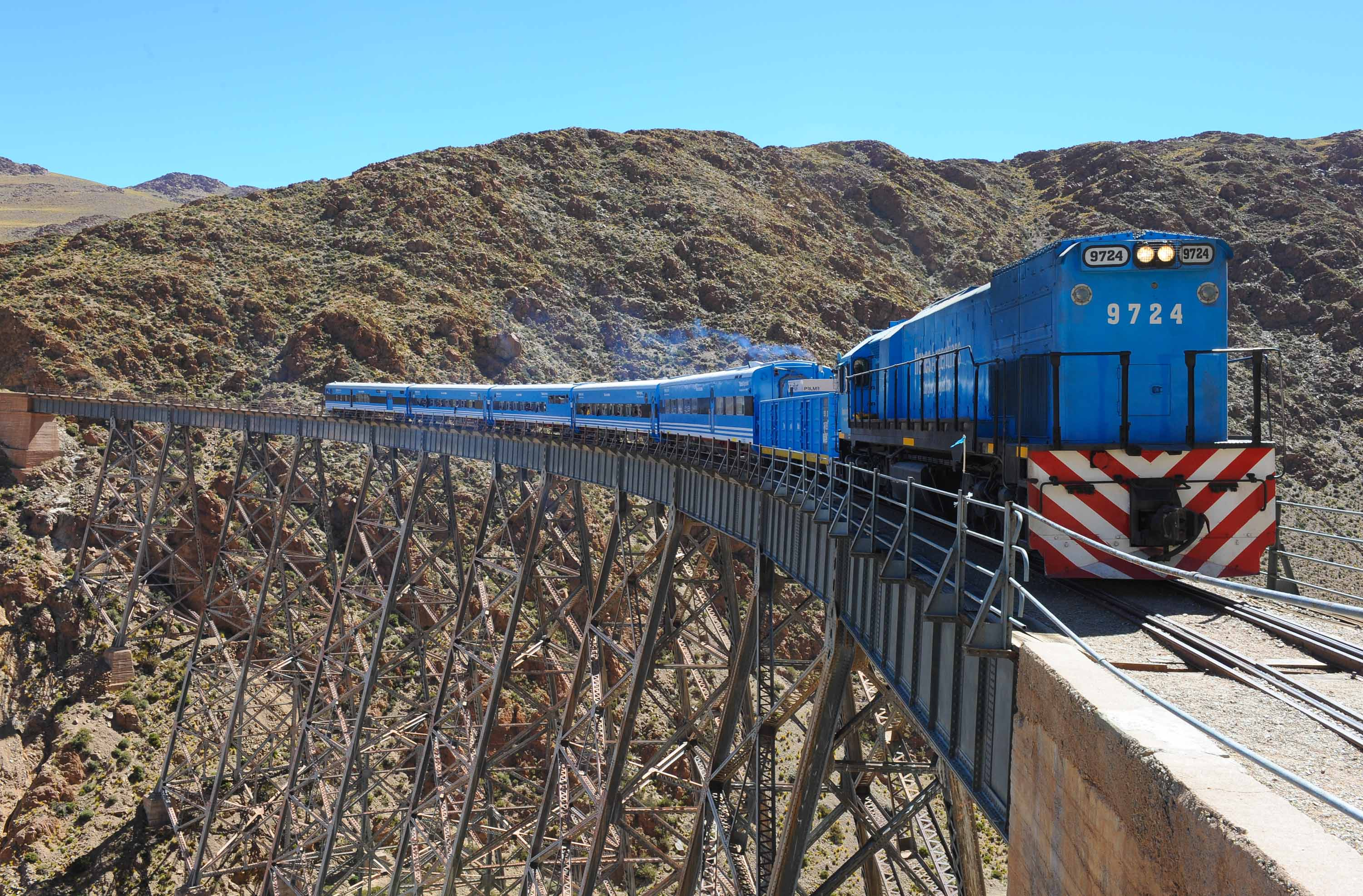
Tren a las Nubes

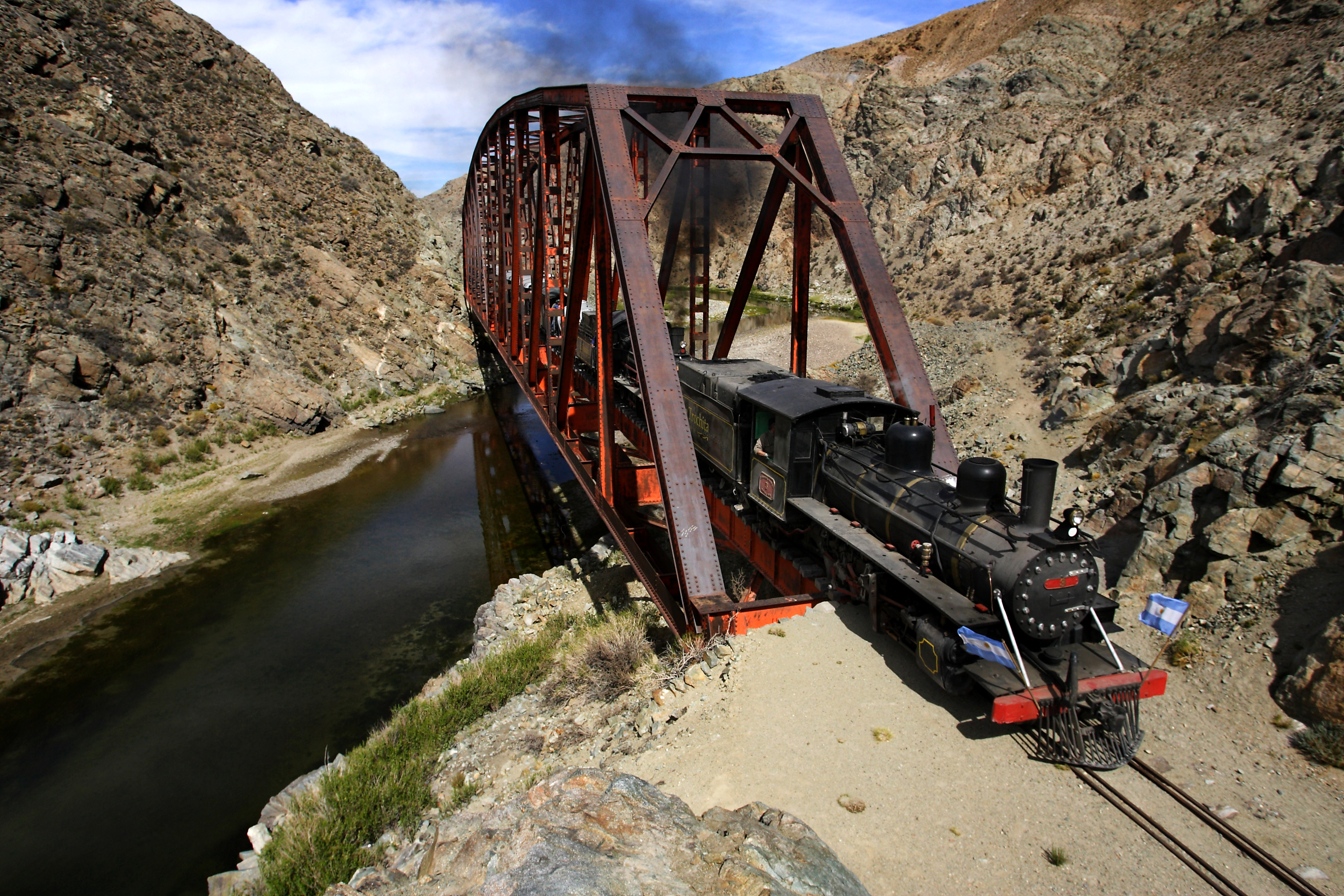
The Old Patagonian Express

- Capilla del Señor Historic Train, in Buenos Aires Province
- Old Patagonian Express, Patagonia
- Train at the End of the World in Tierra del Fuego, Tierra del Fuego
- Tren a las Nubes, Salta
- Tren Histórico de Bariloche, Patagonia (British-built 1912, 4-6-0 steam locomotive to Perito Moreno glacier)
- Villa Elisa Historic Train in Entre Ríos Province

=== Brazil ===
- Estrada de Ferro Central do Brasil
- Rede Mineira de Viação
- Corcovado Rack Railway
- Estrada de Ferro Oeste de Minas
- Estrada de Ferro Perus Pirapora
- Serra Verde Express
- Train of Pantanal
- Trem da Serra da Mantiqueira
- Trem das Águas
- Viação Férrea Campinas Jaguariúna

=== Chile ===
- Colchaguac Wine Train (a Bayer Peacock 2-6-0)
- Tren de la Araucanía Temuco to Victoria (1953 Baldwin 4-8-2)

=== Ecuador ===
- Tren Crucero Ecuador

=== Colombia ===
- Tren Turistico De La Sabana, Bogota

== Asia ==
=== Mainland China ===
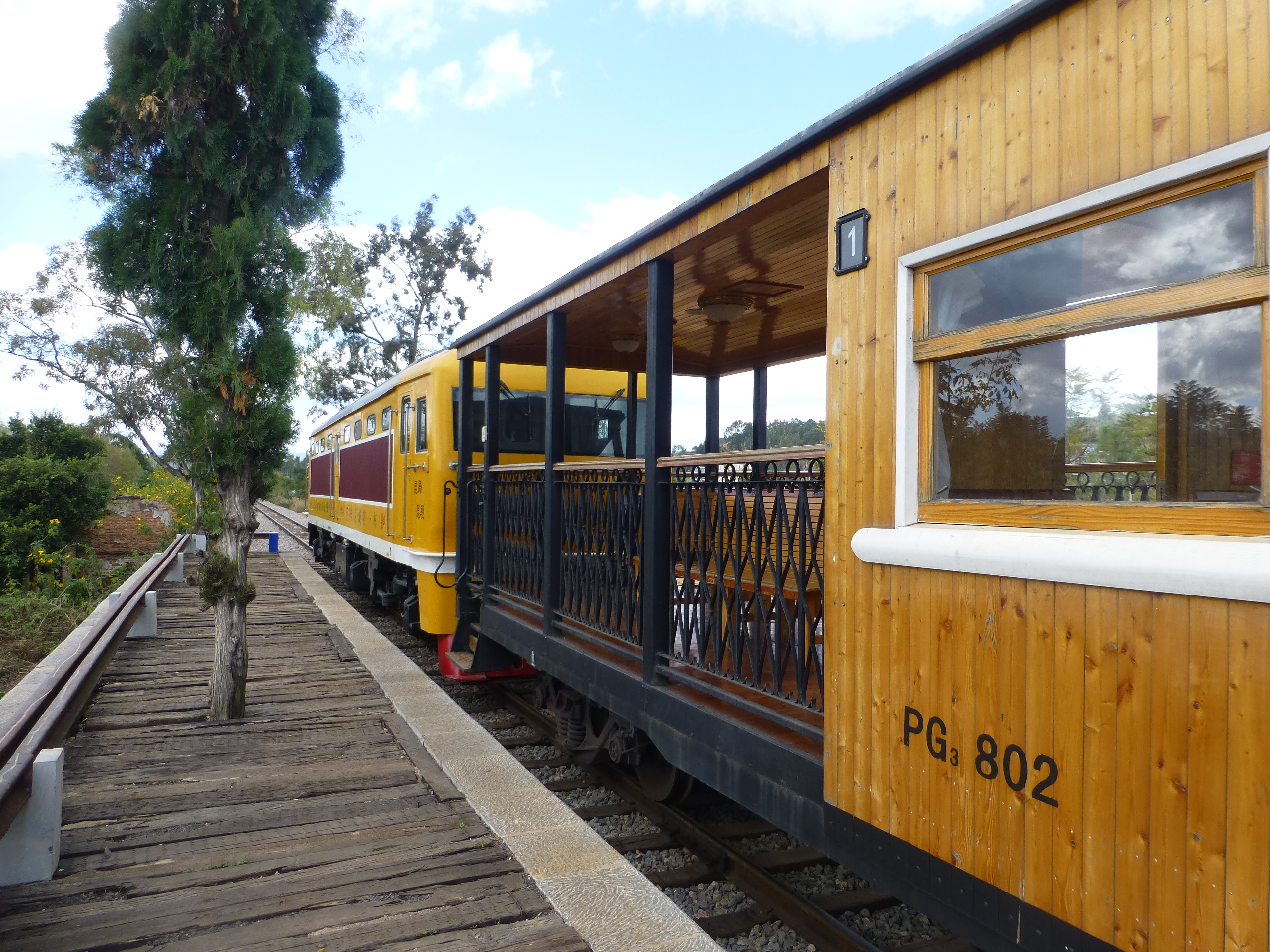
an excursion train in Shuanglongqiao Station

- Jiayang Coal Railway
- Mengzi–Baoxiu Railway (heritage train operation on an otherwise disused section west of Jianshui)
- Tieling-Faku Railway
- Kunming-Hekou Railway
- Huanan Forest Railway
- Chaoyanggou-Qi Railway

=== Hong Kong ===
- Hong Kong Tramways

=== India ===
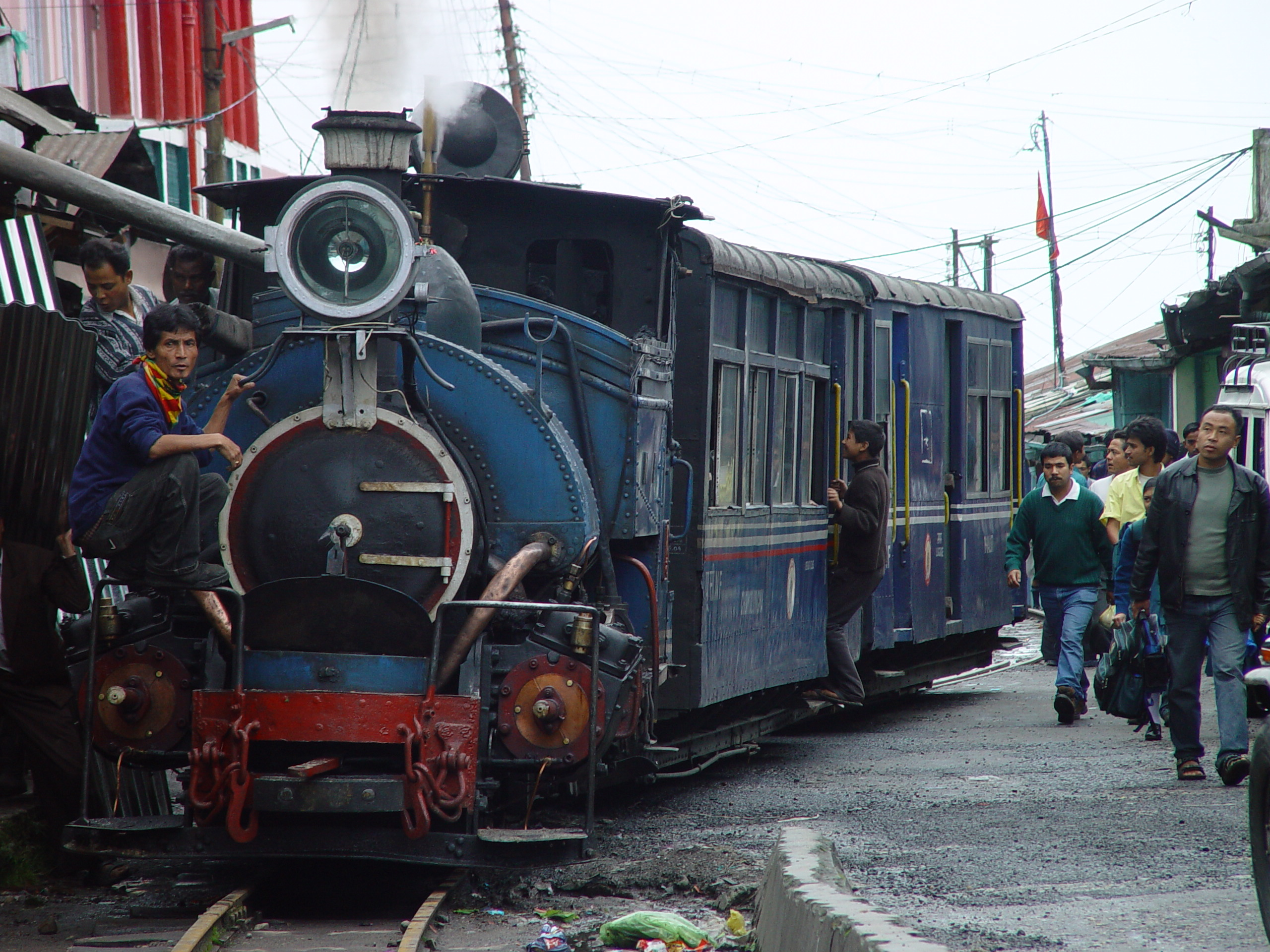
The Darjeeling Himalayan Railway

- Calcutta Tramways
- Darjeeling Himalayan Railway
- Kalka Shimla Railway
- Matheran Hill Railway
- Nilgiri Mountain Railway
- Palace on Wheels

=== Indonesia ===
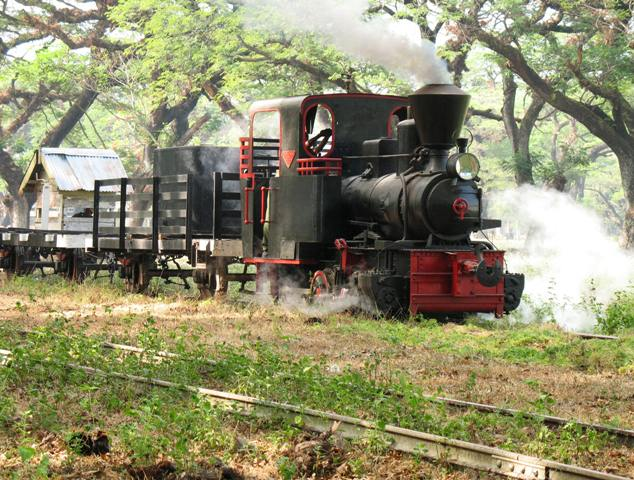
Cepu Forest Railway – Du Croo & Brauns locomotive

- Ambarawa Railway Museum
- Cepu Forest Railway
- Mak Itam Steam Locomotive
- Sepur Kluthuk Jaladara

=== Israel ===
- The Oak Railway (רכבת האלונים) in kibbutz Ein Shemer

=== Japan ===
- Narita Yume Bokujo narrow gauge railway
- Sagano Scenic Railway
- Shuzenji Romney Railway

=== Pakistan ===
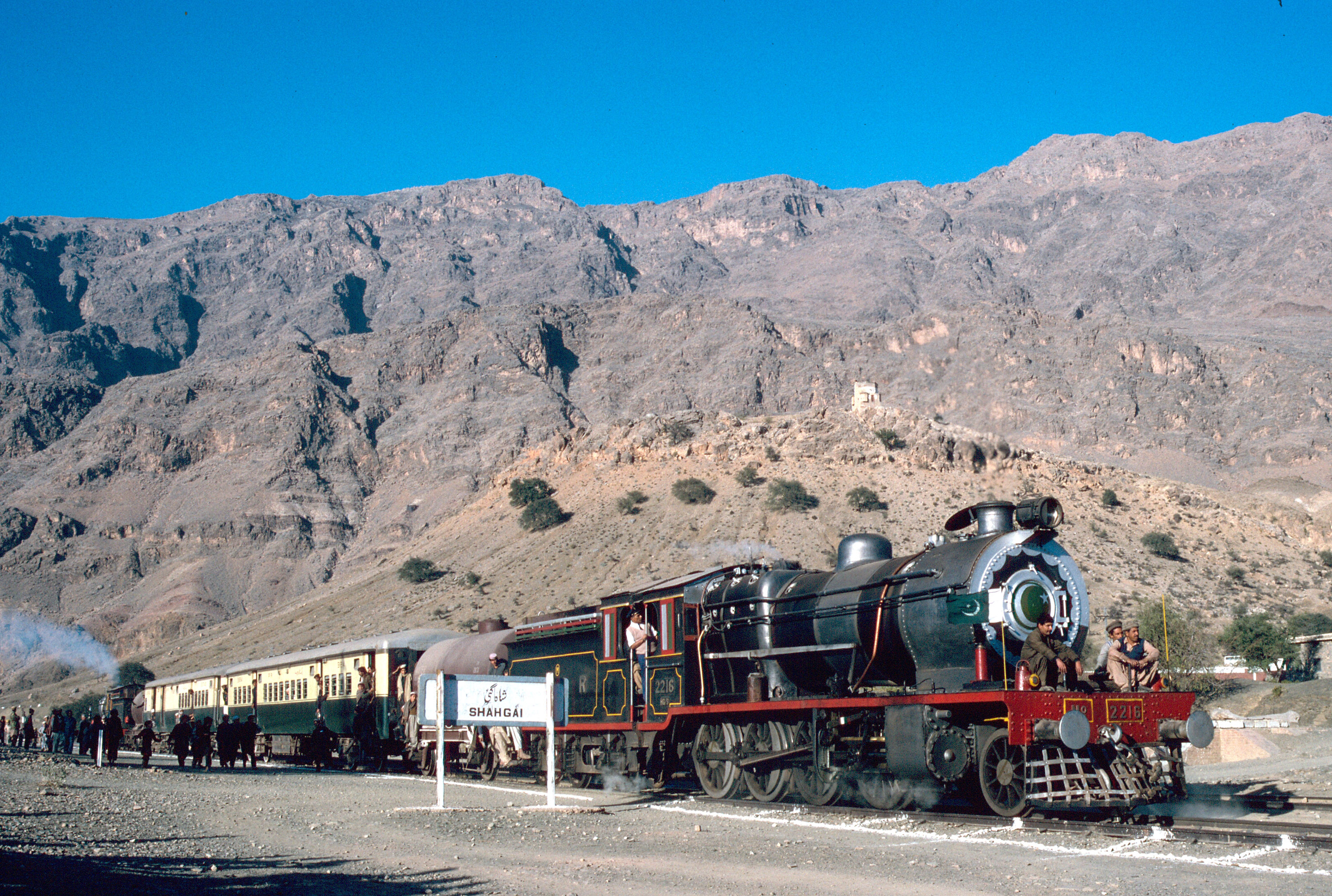
Historical Khyber Railway in Pakistan

- Khyber Railway
- Pakistan Railways Heritage Museum

=== Taiwan ===
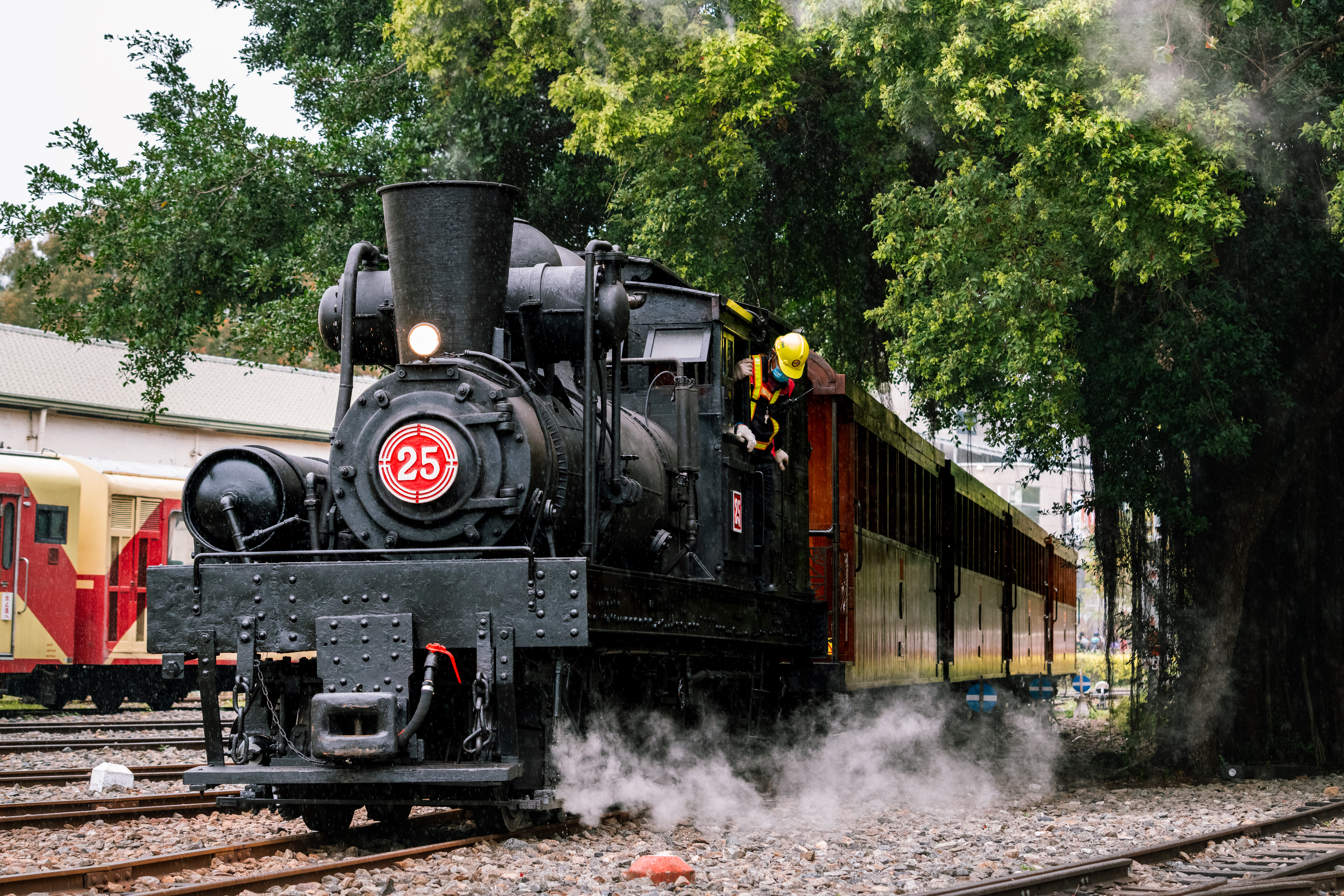
Alishan steam train, engine no 25

- Alishan Forest Railway

== Africa ==
=== South Africa ===
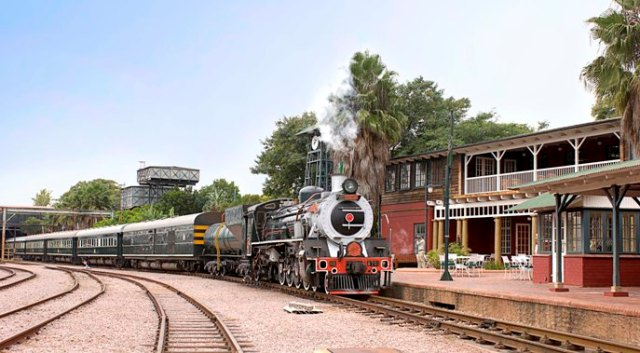
Rovos Rail train about to depart from Capital Park Station

Note that most of the heritage railway operators in South Africa have their own depots where locomotives and coaches are kept and serviced, but run on state-owned railways.

- Atlantic Rail – Now defunct. Formally ran day trips from Cape Town to Simonstown using steam locomotives and heritage coaching stock
- Friends of the Rail – day trips from Hermanstad (Pretoria) using steam locomotives and heritage coaching stock
- Outeniqua Choo Tjoe – A heritage railway that has not operated since August 2006.
- Patons Country Narrow Gauge Railway – a two-foot narrow-gauge heritage railway in KwaZulu-Natal, South Africa, from Ixopo to Umzimkhulu
- Reefsteamers – day trips from Johannesburg to Magaliesburg.
- Rovos Rail – up-market railtours
- The Sandstone Heritage Trust – private railway operating 2-foot gauge steam locomotives
- Umgeni Steam Railway – Kloof to Inchanga, near Durban

=== Tunisia ===
- Lézard rouge

== See also ==
- Heritage tourism
- List of Conservation topics
- List of tourist attractions worldwide
- List of United States railroads
- Mountain railway
