= Narita Yume Bokujo narrow gauge railway =

Coordinates: 35.867445°N 140.395114°E

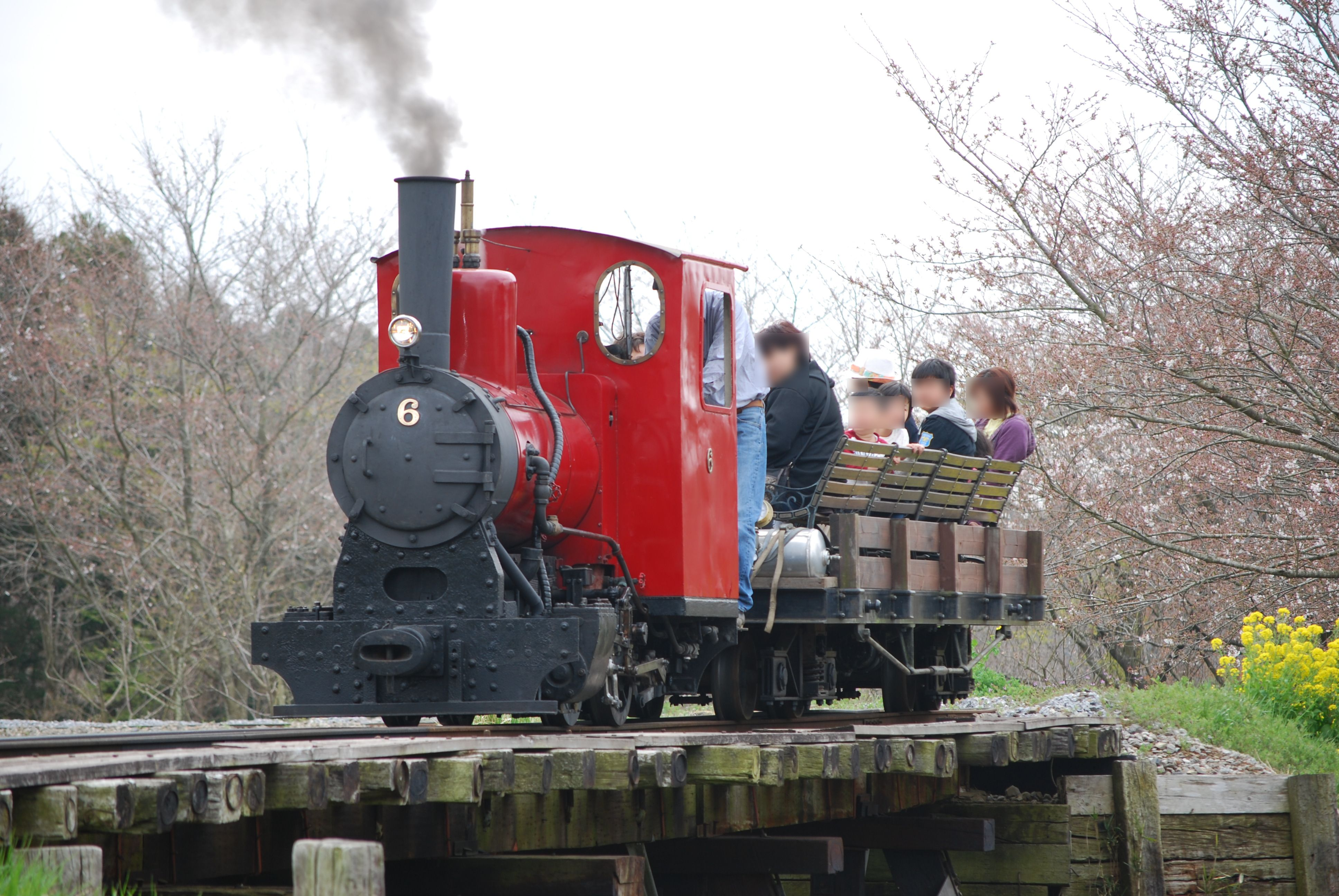
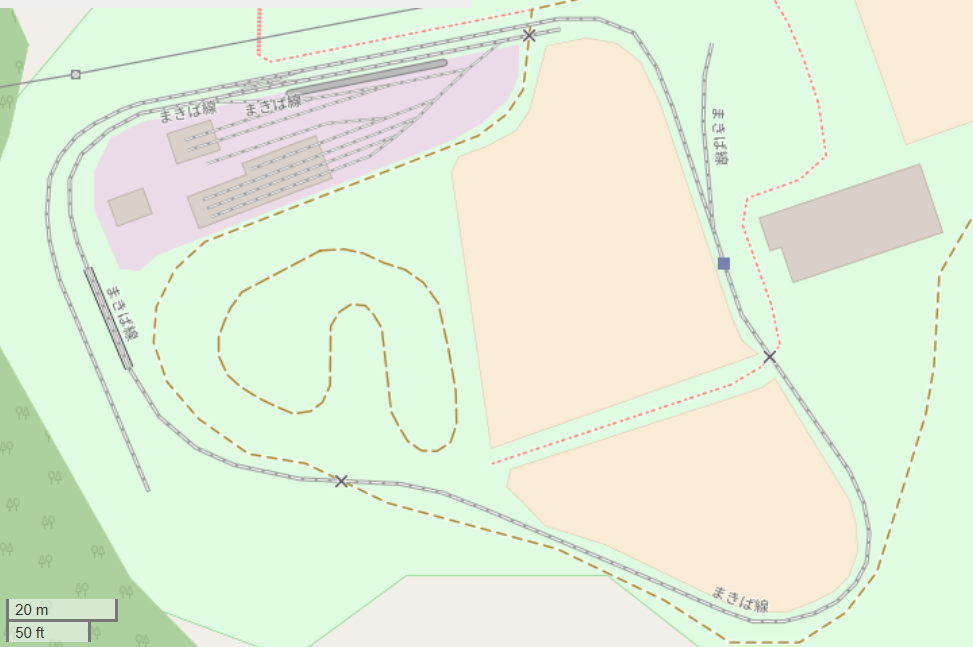
- Steam locomotive No 6 Track

Technical
- Line length: ca. 1/3 mile (0.5 km)
- Track gauge: 2 ft (610 mm)

The Narita Yume Bokujo narrow gauge railway (Japanese 成田ゆめ牧場軽便鉄道) or Makiba Line (まきば線) is an approximately 1/3 mile (0.5 km) long narrow gauge heritage railway with a track gauge of 2 ft (610 mm) near the Japanese City of Narita in Chiba Prefecture. The railway is operated on several days per year by the Rasuchijin Railway Association (羅須地人鉄道協会).

== History ==
The railway is located at Narita Dream Dairy Farm, a 75 acres (30 hectares) agriculture theme park close to Tokyo Narita Airport. Visitors to the farm can watch milk production, and buy ice cream and yoghurt produced there.

== Rolling stock ==
- 0-4-0 Feldbahn steam locomotive No. 3
- 4wDM Kato Works diesel locomotive No. 5
- 0-4-0 Feldbahn steam locomotive No. 6
- 0-4-0 Porter steam locomotive No. 7
- 0-4-0VB Muff Potter vertical boiler No. 11
- Additional locomotives, passenger carriages and goods wagons
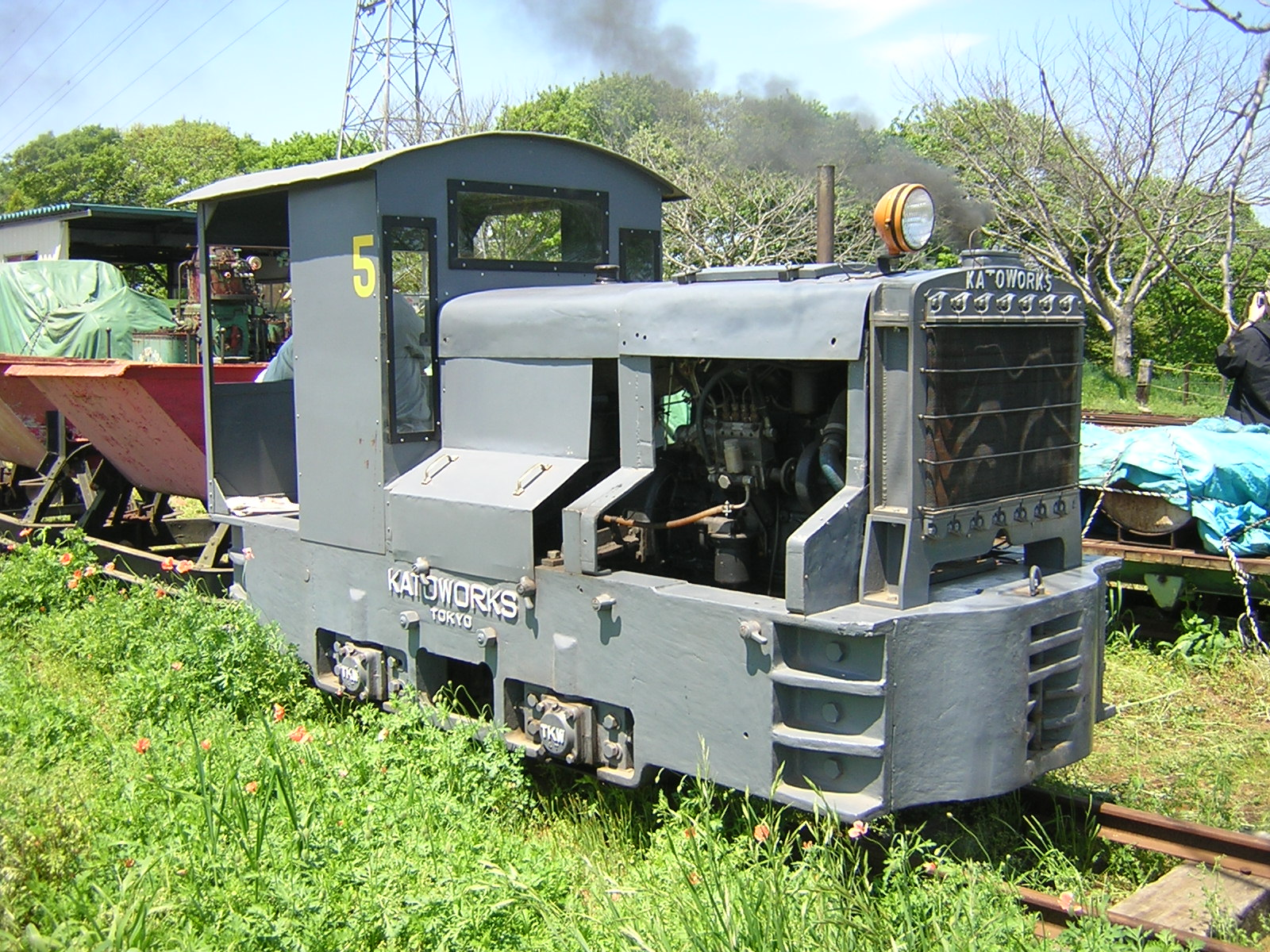
Kato Works diesel locomotive No. 5

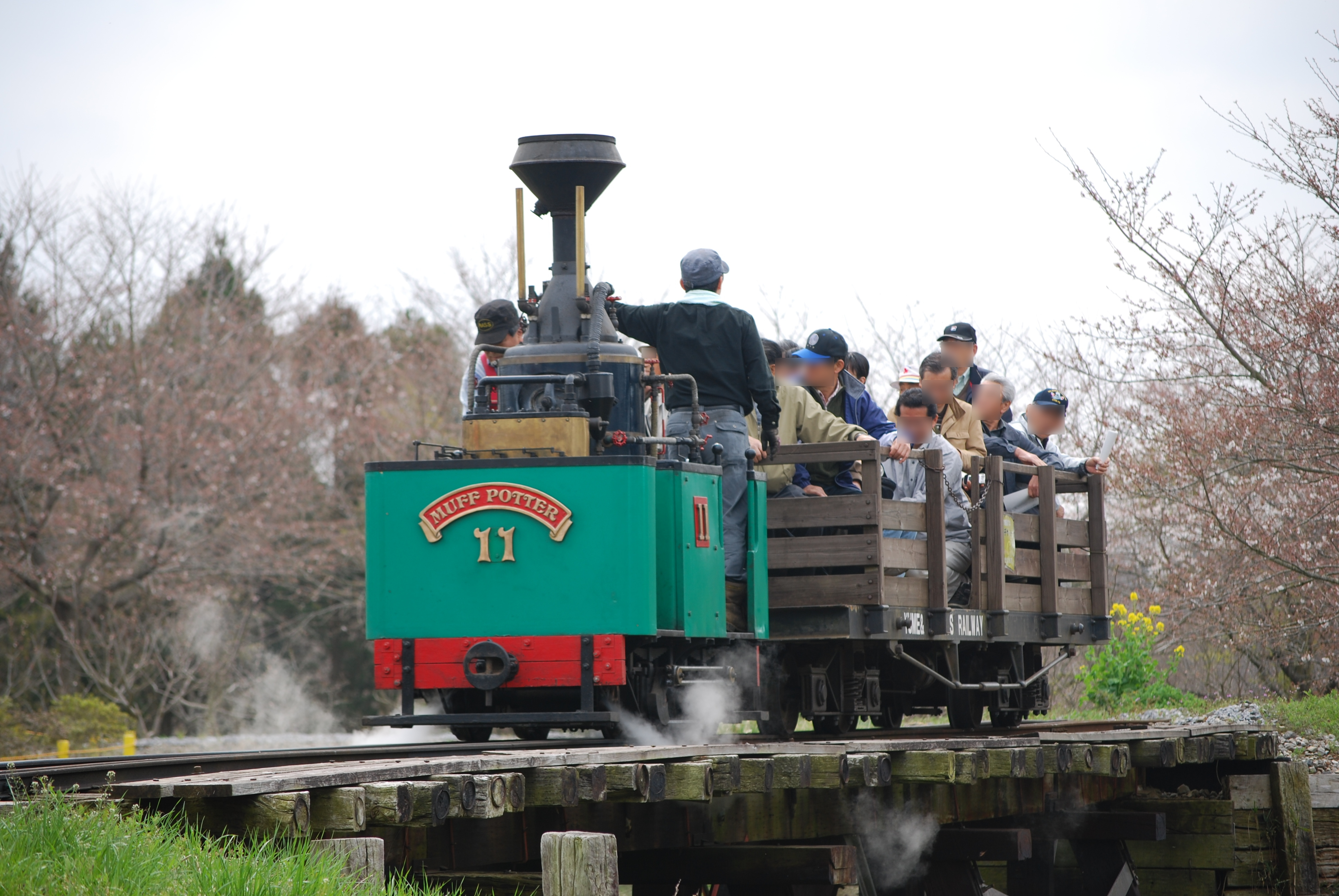
Muff Potter vertical boiler No. 11
