= Train of Pantanal =

Railway in the state of Mato Grosso do Sul, Brazil

- Trem o Pantanal

Overview
- Main region(s): Mato Grosso do Sul
- Headquarters: Corumbá, MS, Brazil
- Dates of operation: 1914–1996 / 2009–2015

Technical
- Track gauge: 1,000 mm (3 ft 3 3/8 in)

The Train of Pantanal (Portuguese, Trem do Pantanal) is a railway in the state of Mato Grosso do Sul, Brazil that passes through the Pantanal region. It begins in the city of Campo Grande and ends in Corumbá, a total distance of 420 km. It is sometimes referred to, incorrectly, as the Train of Death. The 'Train of Death' was actually the continuation of the route across the border into Bolivia from Puerto Suarez to Santa Cruz del la Sierra, a true "Trem da Morte." In the absence of decent all-weather roads linking Corumba with Campo Grande, the train offered a decent journey, first and second class, a restaurant car and sleepers across the Pantanal to Bauru, taking over all about 30 hours. The completion of the road killed off the passenger railway service.

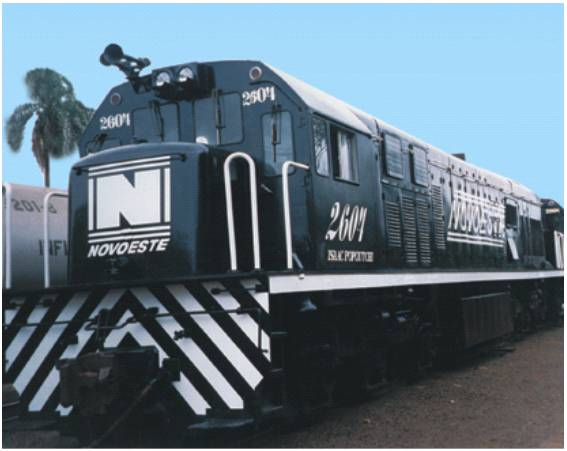
Trem do Pantanal

== History ==
The line was inaugurated in 1914 and was finished in 1950. The government plans on reconstructing the train slowly by 2009, although it was initially predicted to be completed by 2005.
