= Railway Interpretation Center =

Railway Museum in Móra la Nova
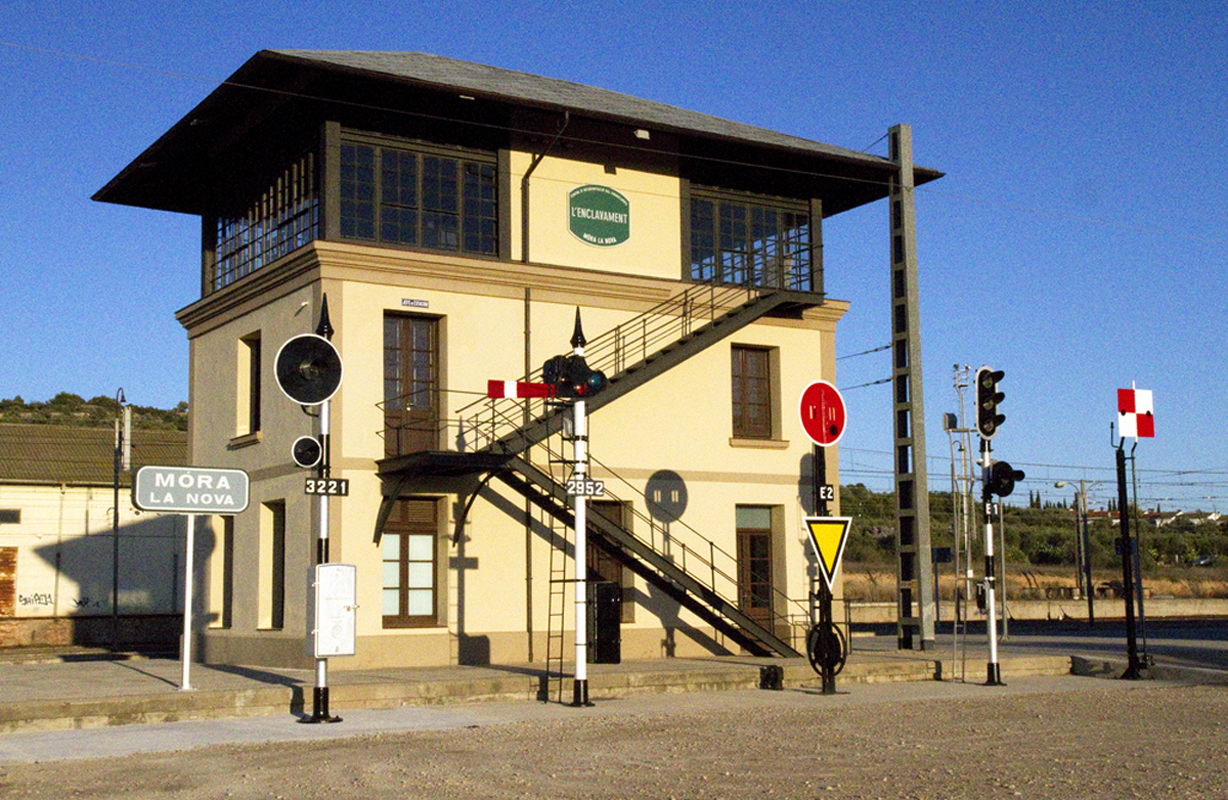
- Established: 2001
- Location: Móra la Nova, Catalonia, Spain
- Coordinates: 41°06′27″N 0°39′09″E
- Type: Railway museum
- Website: https://museuferrocarril.cat/

The Railway Museum in Móra la Nova is a project of industrial archaeology in Spain that includes the launch of a tourist steam train going from the Mediterranean sea shore (the Gold Coast) inland towards the Ebro River valley, as well as the creation of a professional school to learn railway-related skills.

It's located in the old railway facilities at Mora la Nova, where there was the largest depot of steam locomotives in Spain, with 100 locomotives and 1,000 employees. As of 2015 the visitor may enjoy a guided tour of the signal box, housing one of the first electromechanical control systems in Europe; the 23-meter turntable and the old rolling stock depots, now used as restoration shops. The tour ends with a visit to the new enclosed shed for the tourist train, where several locomotives, self-propelled units, coaches and freight cars are being restored and preserved, all of them showing the railroad evolution through the years. Amongst them is the 241F-2238, the only remaining unit of the most powerful steam locomotives from the Mora la Nova old depot, which headed the express trains between Barcelona and Madrid during the 1950s and 1960s.

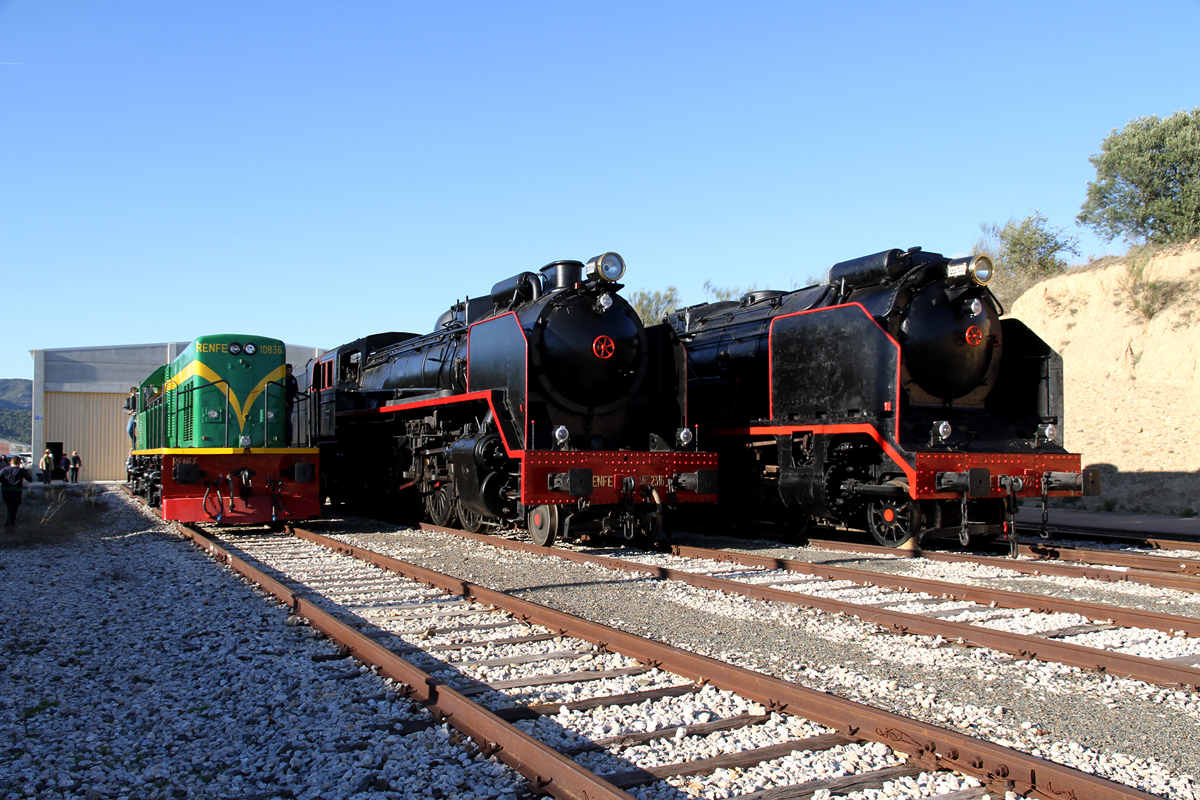
Some locomotives of the collection.

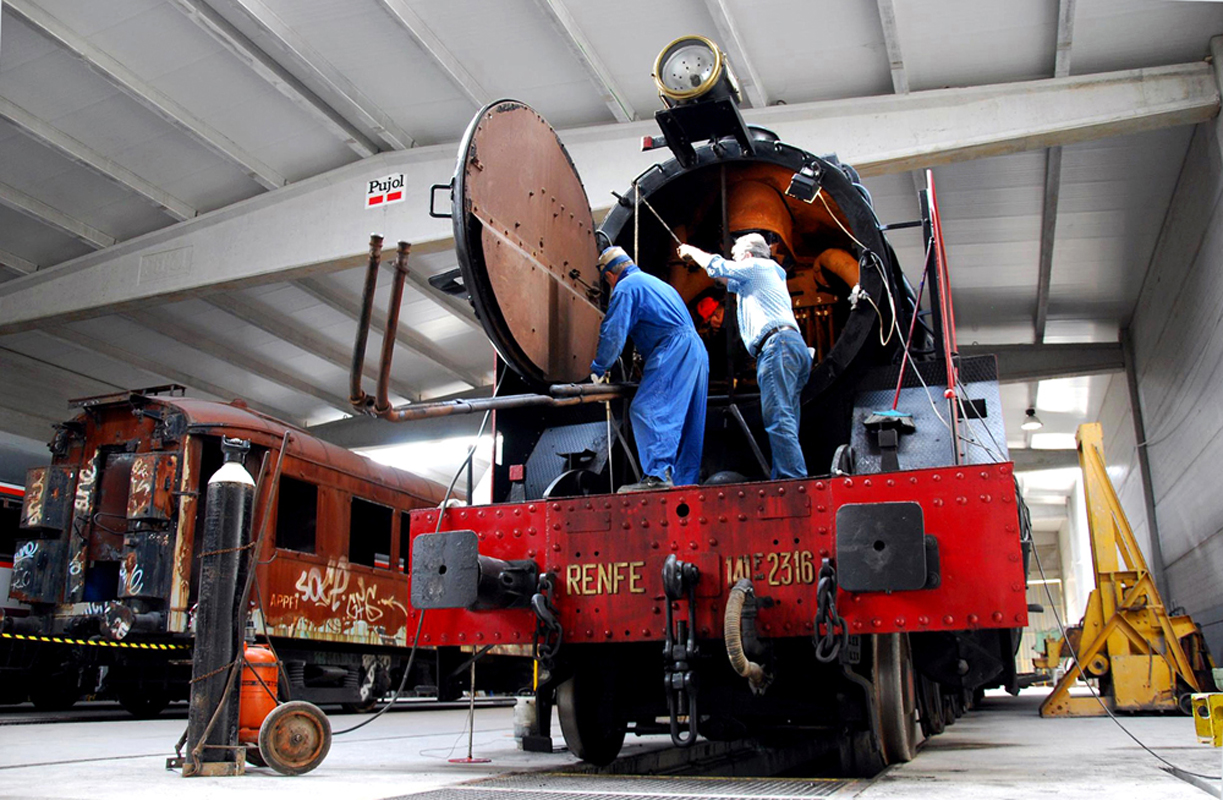
Operational restoration of the 141F-2316 Mikado.
