= Heritage railway =

Railway used for heritage/historical/tourism purposes

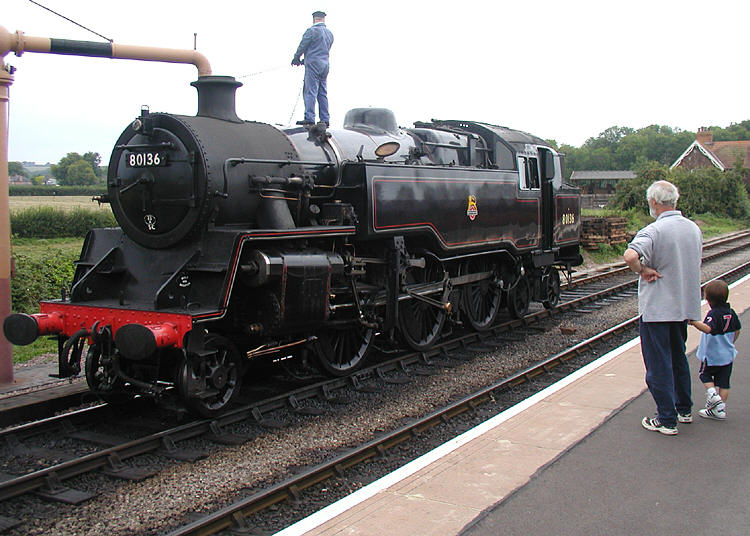
A BR Standard Class 4 2-6-4Ttank engine takes on water through a water crane at the Bishops Lydeard station of the West Somerset Railway.

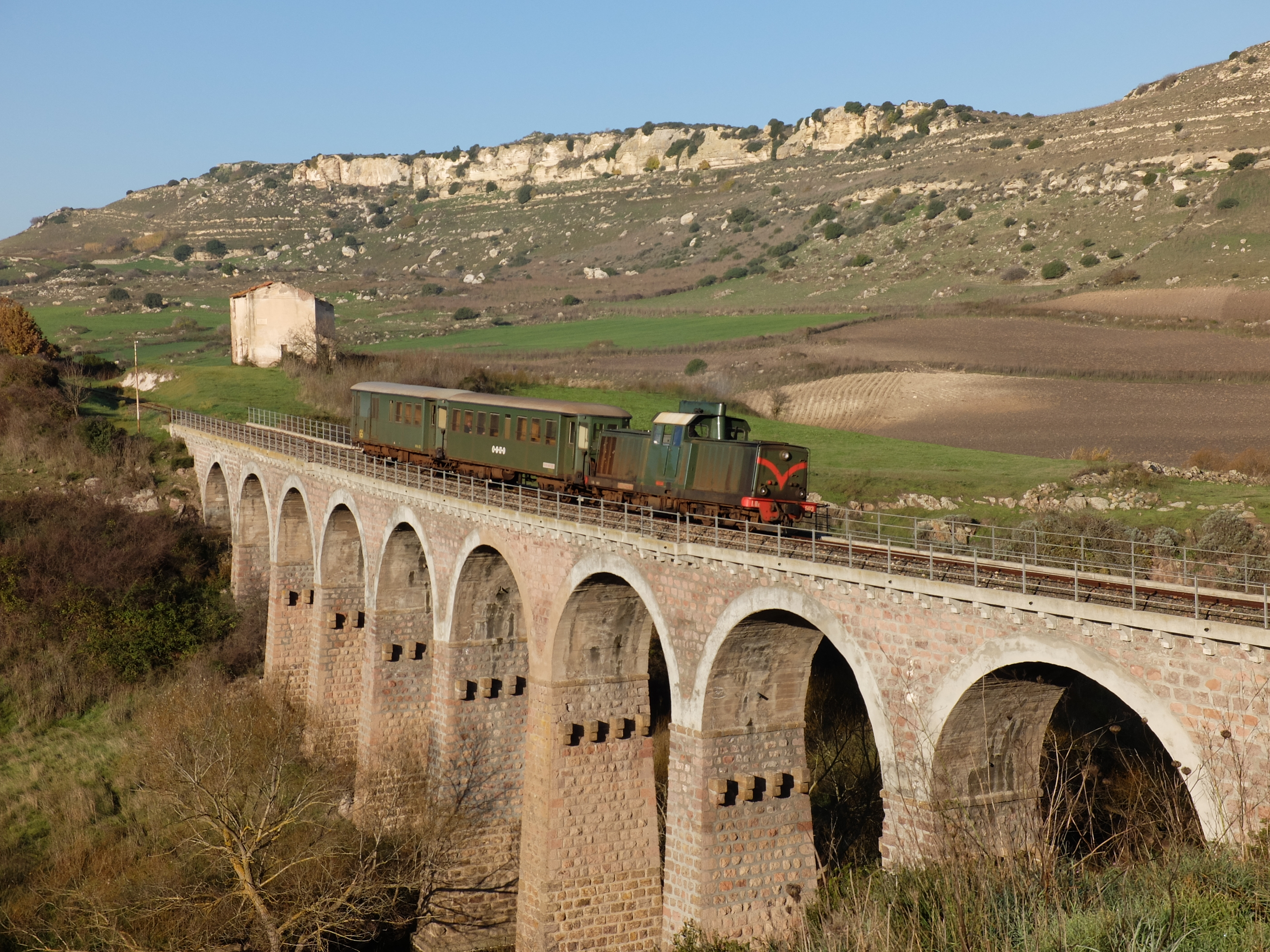
Tourist train in transit on a viaduct of the Sassari–Tempio–Palau railway in Italy

A heritage railway or heritage railroad (U.S. usage) is a railway operated as living history to re-create or preserve railway scenes of the past. Heritage railways are often old railway lines preserved in a state depicting a period (or periods) in the history of rail transport, but mainly serve tourism or rail enthusiasts and do not derive significant income from hauling freight or other purposes.

== Definition ==
The British Office of Rail and Road defines heritage railways as follows:

...'lines of local interest', museum railways or tourist railways that have retained or assumed the character and appearance and operating practices of railways of former times. Several lines that operate in isolation provide genuine transport facilities, providing community links. Most lines constitute tourist or educational attractions in their own right. Much of the rolling stock and other equipment used on these systems is original and is of historic value in its own right. Many systems aim to replicate both the look and operating practices of historic former railways companies.

== Infrastructure ==
Heritage railway lines have historic rail infrastructure which has been substituted (or made obsolete) in modern rail systems. Historical installations, such as hand-operated points, water cranes, and rails fastened with hand-hammered rail spikes, are characteristic features of heritage lines. Unlike tourist railways, which primarily carry tourists and have modern installations and vehicles, heritage-line infrastructure creates views and soundscapes of the past in operation.

== Operation ==
Due to a lack of modern technology or the desire for historical accuracy, railway operations can be handled with traditional practices such as the use of tokens. Heritage infrastructure and operations often require the assignment of roles, based on historical occupations, to the railway staff. Some, or all, staff and volunteers, including station masters and signalmen, sometimes wearing period-appropriate attire, can be seen on some heritage railways. Most heritage railways use heritage rolling stock, although modern rail vehicles can be used to showcase railway scenes with historical-line infrastructure.

=== Cost ===
While some heritage railways are profitable tourist attractions, many are not-for-profit entities; some of the latter depend on enthusiastic volunteers for upkeep and operations to supplement revenue from traffic and visitors. Still other heritage railways offer a viable public-transit option, and can maintain operations with revenue from regular riders or government subsidies.

== Development ==
=== Children's railways ===
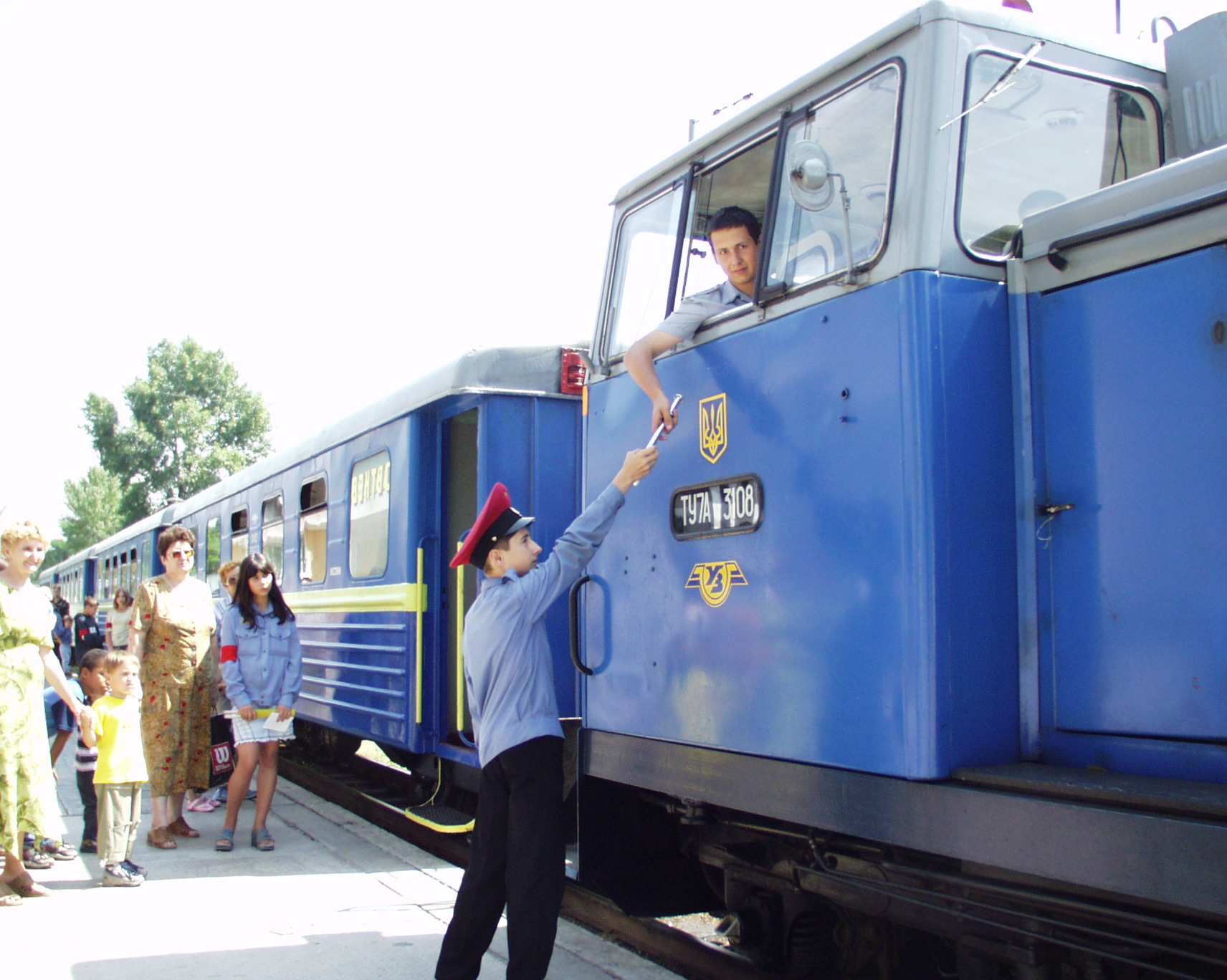
Token-passing at a children's railway in Zaporizhia, Ukraine

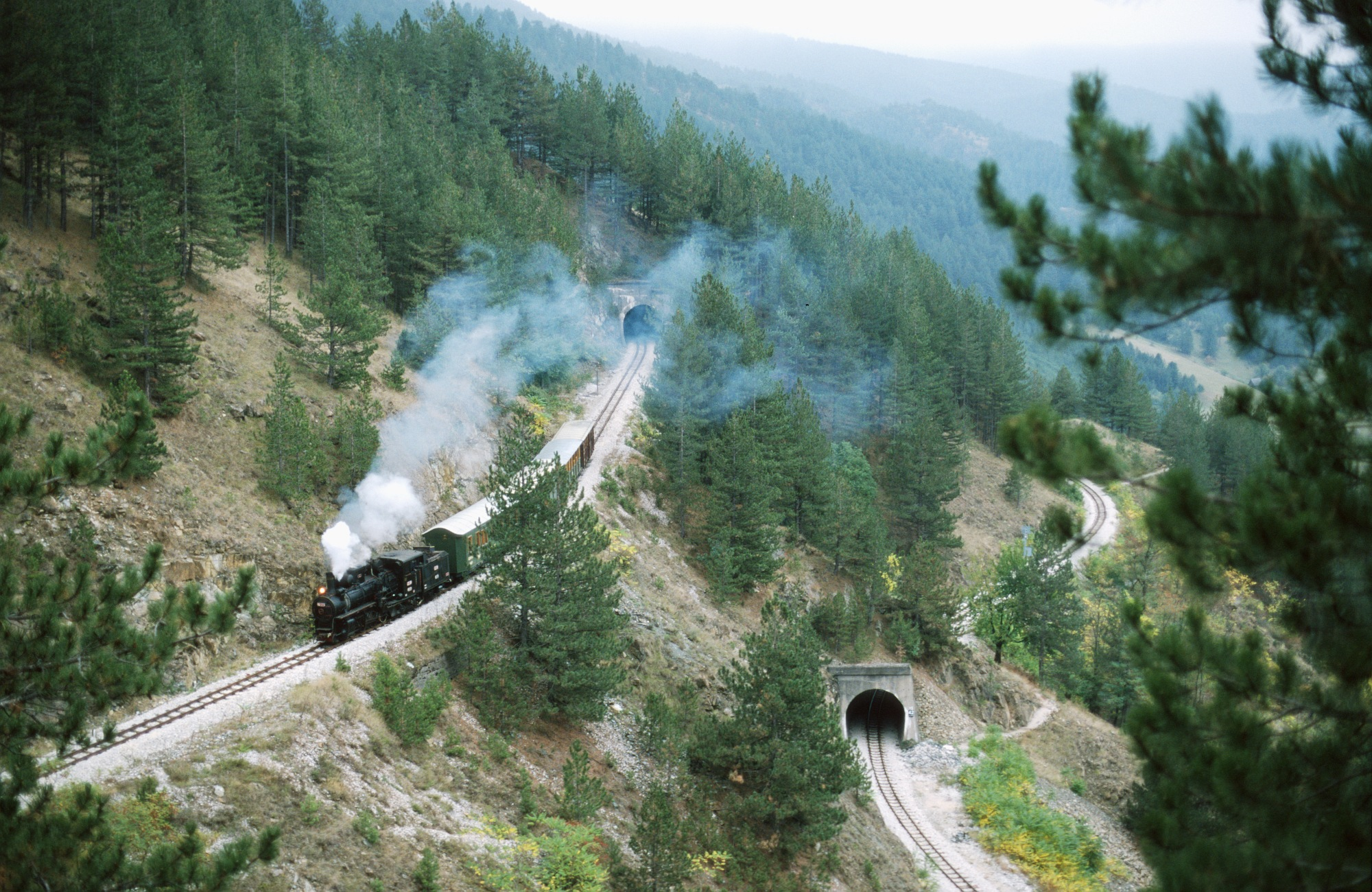
Steam train on Šargan Eight

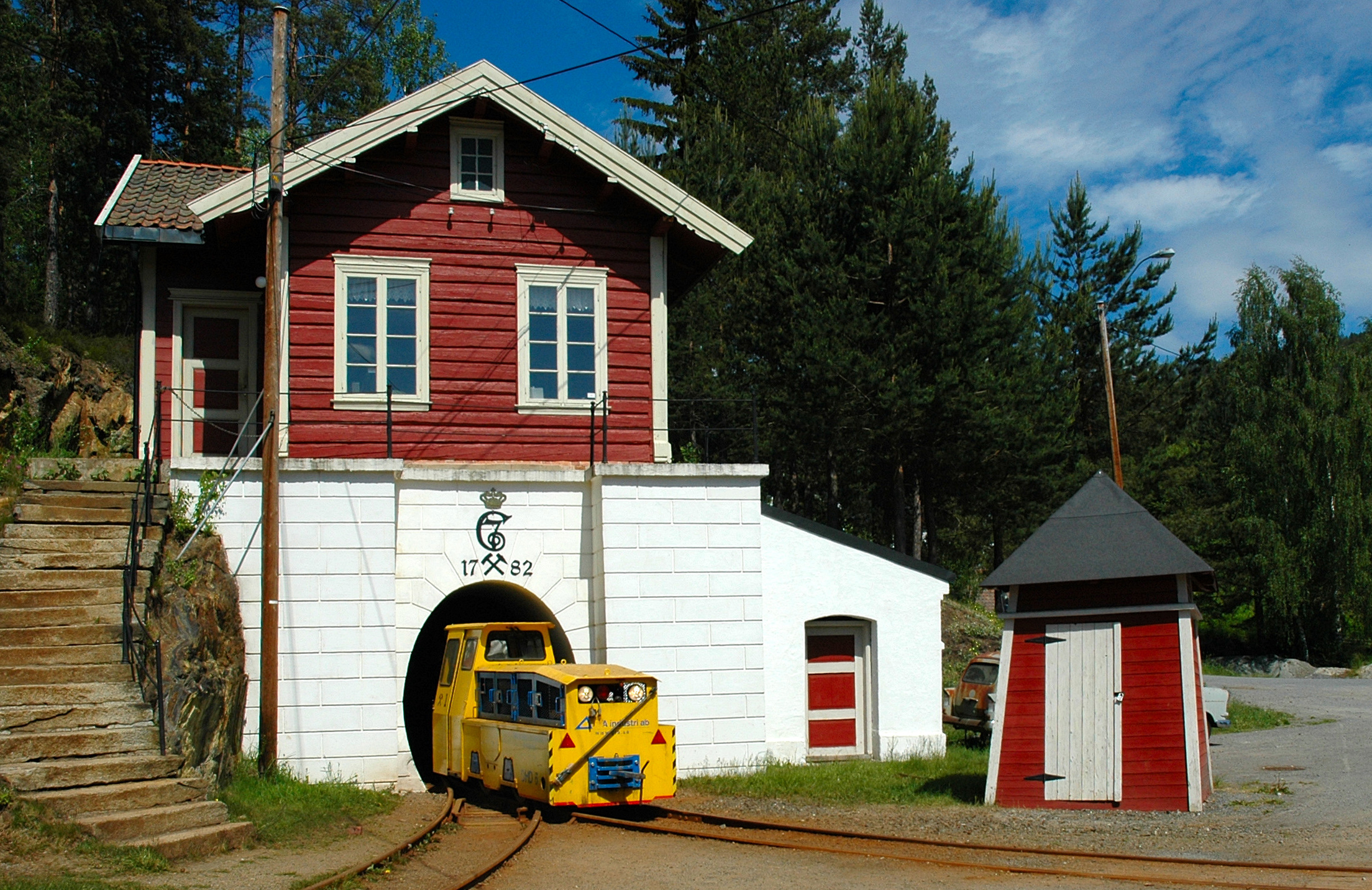
Entrance of King's Mine in Kongsberg, Norway

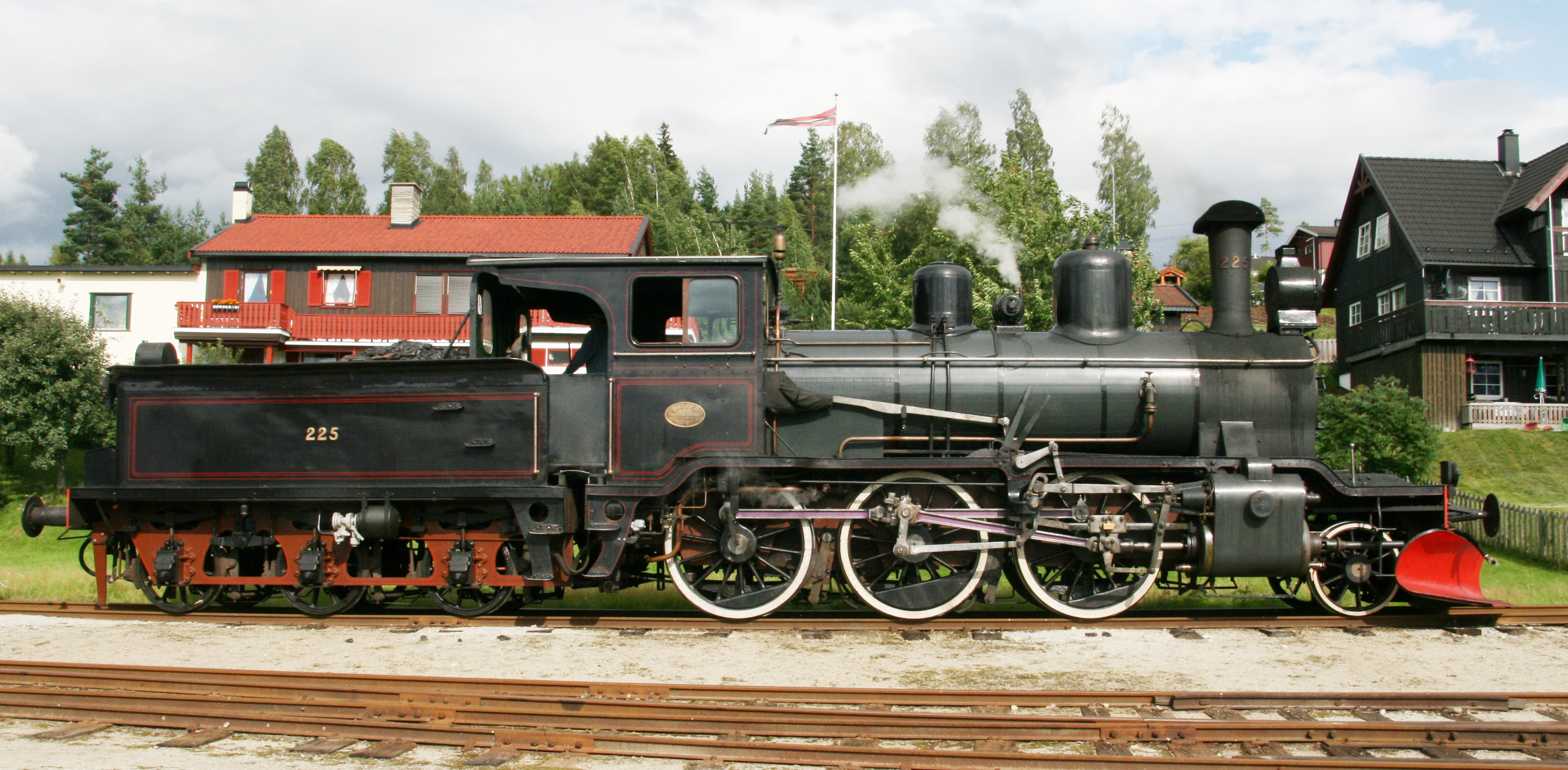
Steam engine no. 225 on Krøderbanen heritage railway, Norway

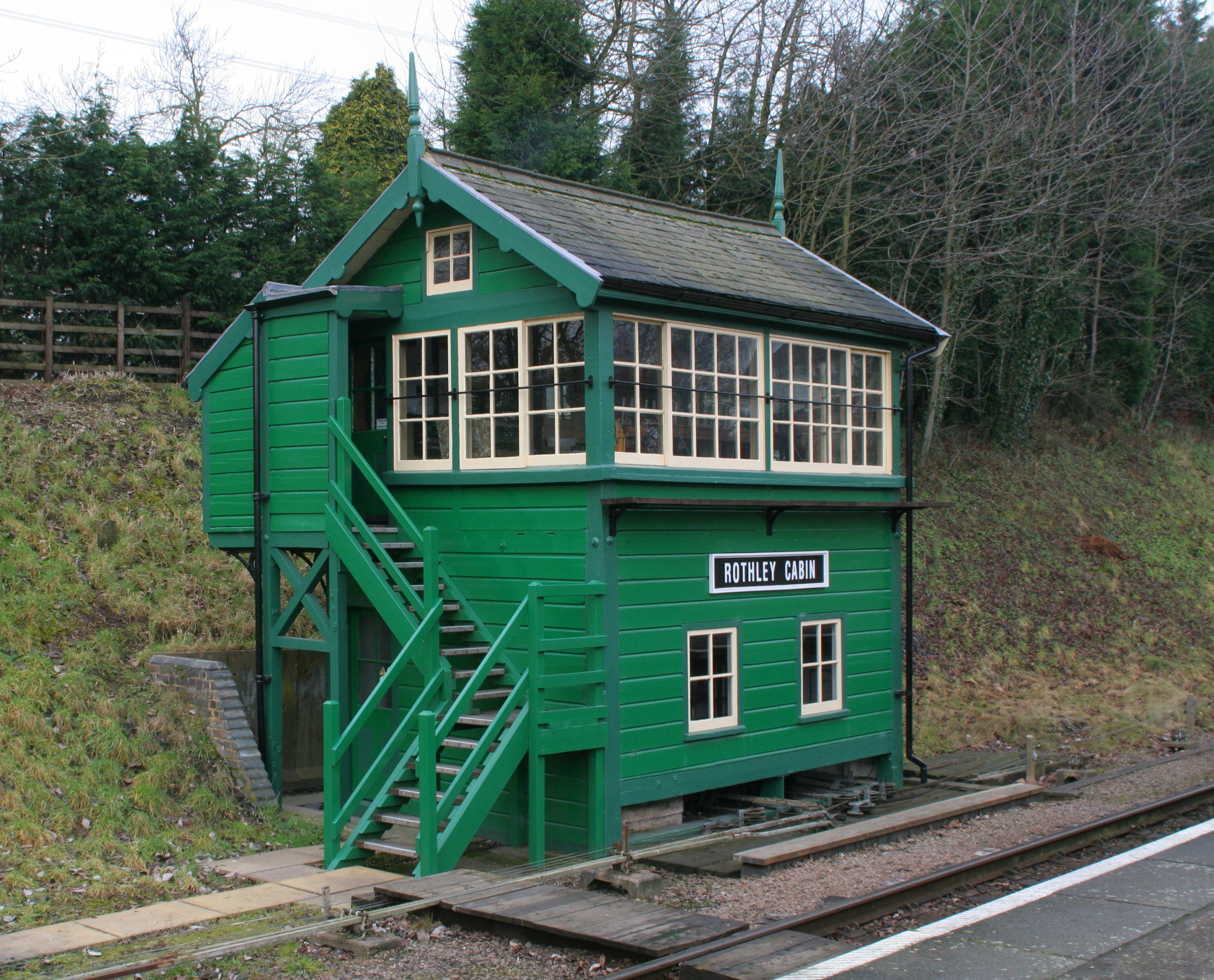
Signal box on the Great Central Railway in Leicestershire, England

Children's railways are extracurricular educational institutions where children and teenagers learn about railway work; they are often functional, passenger-carrying narrow-gauge rail lines. The railways developed in the USSR during the Soviet era. Many were called "Pioneer railways", after the youth organisation of that name. The first children's railway opened in Moscow in 1932 and, at the breakup of the USSR, 52 children's railways existed in the country. Although the fall of communist governments has led to the closure of some, preserved children's railways are still functioning in post-Soviet states and Eastern European countries.

Many children's railways were built on parkland in urban areas. Unlike many industrial areas typically served by a narrow-gauge railway, parks were free of redevelopment. Child volunteers and socialist fiscal policy enabled the existence of many of these railways. Children's railways which still carry traffic have often retained their original infrastructure and rolling stock, including vintage steam locomotives; some have acquired heritage vehicles from other railways.

Examples of children's railways with steam locomotives include the Dresden Park Railway in Germany; the Gyermekvasút in Budapest; the Park Railway Maltanka in Poznań; the Košice Children's Railway in Slovakia, and the 7 1/4 in (184 mm) gauge steam railway on the grounds of St Nicholas' School in Merstham, Surrey, which the children help operate with assistance from the East Surrey 16mm Group and other volunteers.

=== Mountain railways ===
Creating passages for trains up steep hills and through mountain regions offers many obstacles which call for technical solutions. Steep grade railway technologies and extensive tunneling may be employed. The use of narrow gauge allows tighter curves in the track, and offers a smaller structure gauge and tunnel size. At high altitudes, construction and logistical difficulties, limited urban development and demand for transport and special rolling-stock requirements have left many mountain railways unmodernized. The engineering feats of past railway builders and views of pristine mountain scenes have made many railways in mountainous areas profitable tourist attractions.

=== Pit railways ===
Pit railways have been in operation in underground mines all over the world. Small rail vehicles transport ore, waste rock, and workers through narrow tunnels. Sometimes trains were the sole mode of transport in the passages between the work sites and the mine entrance. The railway's loading gauge often dictated the cross-section of passages to be dug. At many mining sites, pit railways have been abandoned due to mine closure or adoption of new transportation equipment. Some show mines have a vintage pit railway and offer mantrip rides into the mine.

=== Underground railways ===
The Metro 1 (officially the Millennium Underground Railway or M1), built from 1894 to 1896, is the oldest line of the Budapest Metro system and the second-oldest underground railway in the world. The M1 underwent major reconstruction during the 1980s and 1990s, and Line 1 now serves eight original stations whose original appearance has been preserved. In 2002, the line was listed as a UNESCO World Heritage Site. In the Deák Ferenc Square concourse's Millennium Underground Museum, many other artifacts of the metro's early history may be seen.

== By country ==
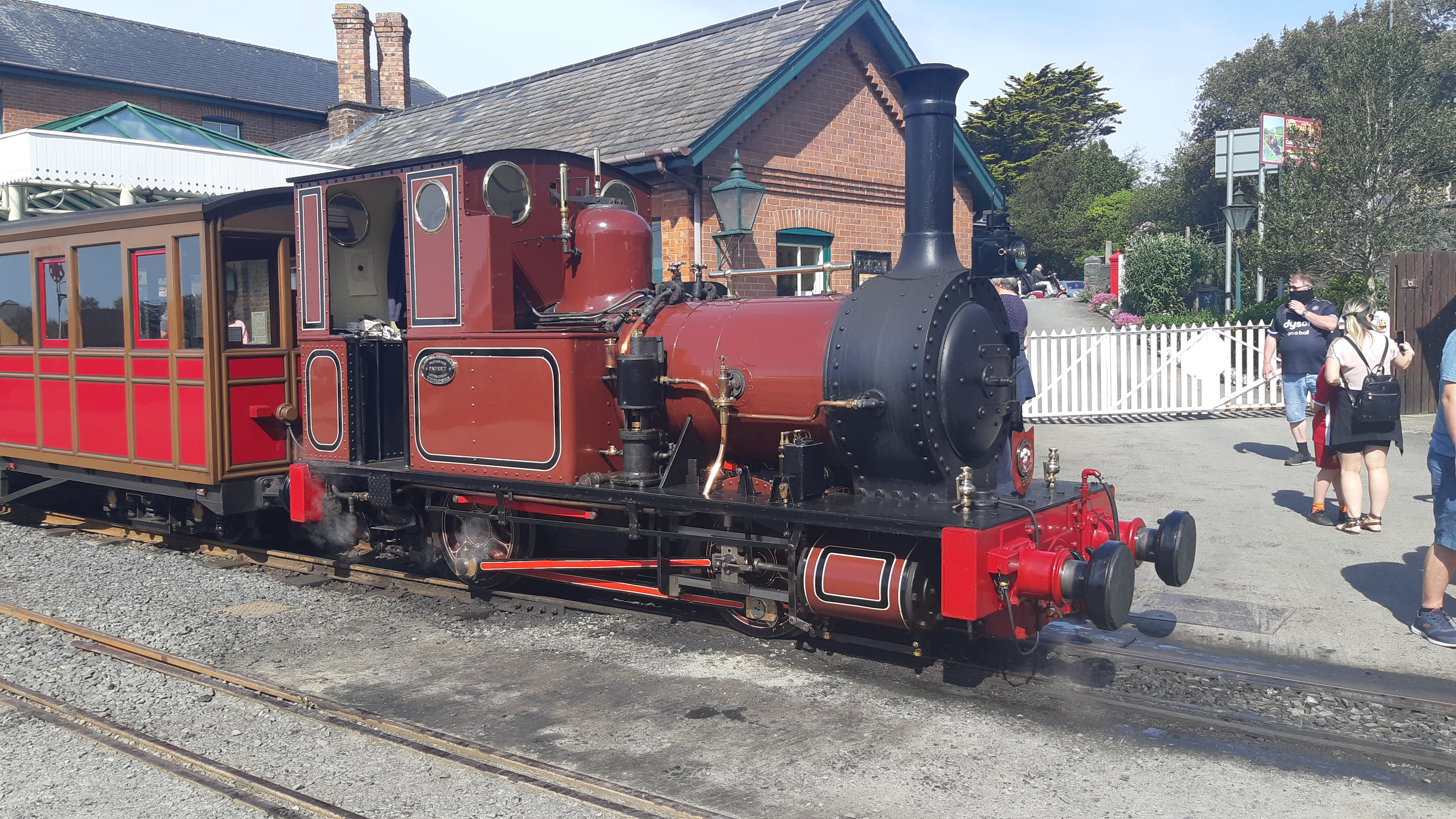
The Talyllyn Railway

The first heritage railway to be rescued and run entirely by volunteers was the Talyllyn Railway in Wales. This narrow-gauge line, taken over by a group of enthusiasts in 1950, was the beginning of the preservation movement worldwide.

=== Argentina ===
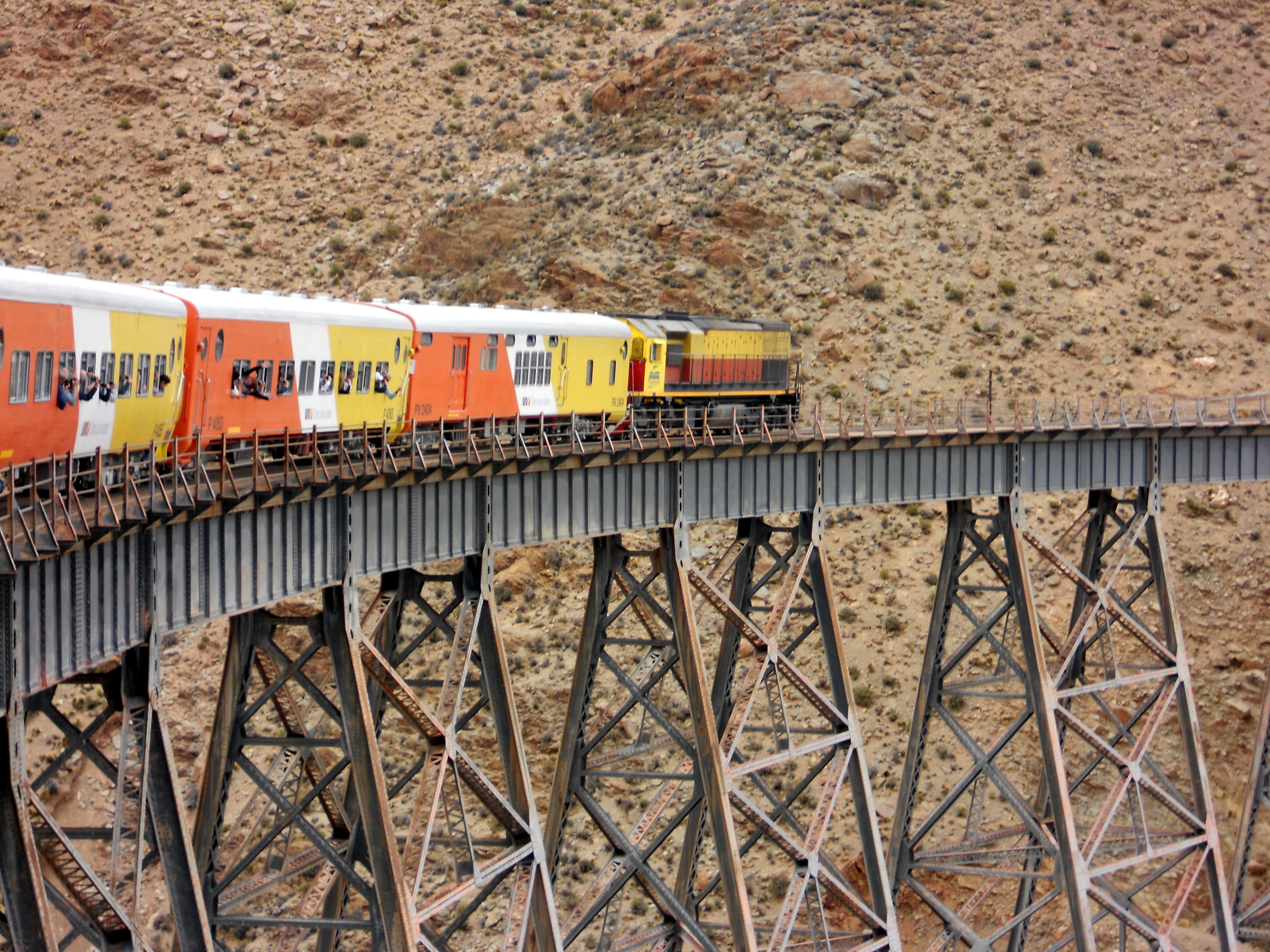
Tren a las Nubes (Train to the Clouds) crossing the Polvorilla viaduct in Salta Province

La Trochita (officially Viejo Expreso Patagónico, the Old Patagonian Express) was declared a National Historic Monument by the Government of Argentina in 1999. Trains on the Patagonian 750 mm (2 ft 5 1/2 in) narrow-gauge railway use steam locomotives. The 402-kilometre-long (250 mi) railway runs through the foothills of the Andes between Esquel and El Maitén in Chubut Province and Ingeniero Jacobacci in Río Negro Province.

In southern Argentina, the Train of the End of the World to the Tierra del Fuego National Park is considered the world's southernmost functioning railway. Heritage railway operations started in 1994, after restoration of the old 500 mm (19 3/4 in) (narrow-gauge) steam railway.

In Salta Province in northeastern Argentina, the Tren a las Nubes (Train to the Clouds) runs along 220 km (140 mi) of 1,000 mm (3 ft 3 3/8 in) metre gauge track in what is one of the highest railways in the world. The line has 29 bridges, 21 tunnels, 13 viaducts, two spirals and two zigzags, and its highest point is 4,220 metres (13,850 ft) above sea level.

In the Misiones Province, more precisely in the Iguazú National Park, is the Ecological Train of the Forest. With a speed below 20 km per hour to avoid interfering with wildlife and the formations are propelled to liquefied petroleum gas (LPG), a non-polluting fuel.

The Villa Elisa Historic Train (operated by Ferroclub Central Entrerriano) runs steam trains between the cities of Villa Elisa and Caseros in Entre Ríos Province, covering 36 km (22 mi) in 120 minutes.

=== Australia ===
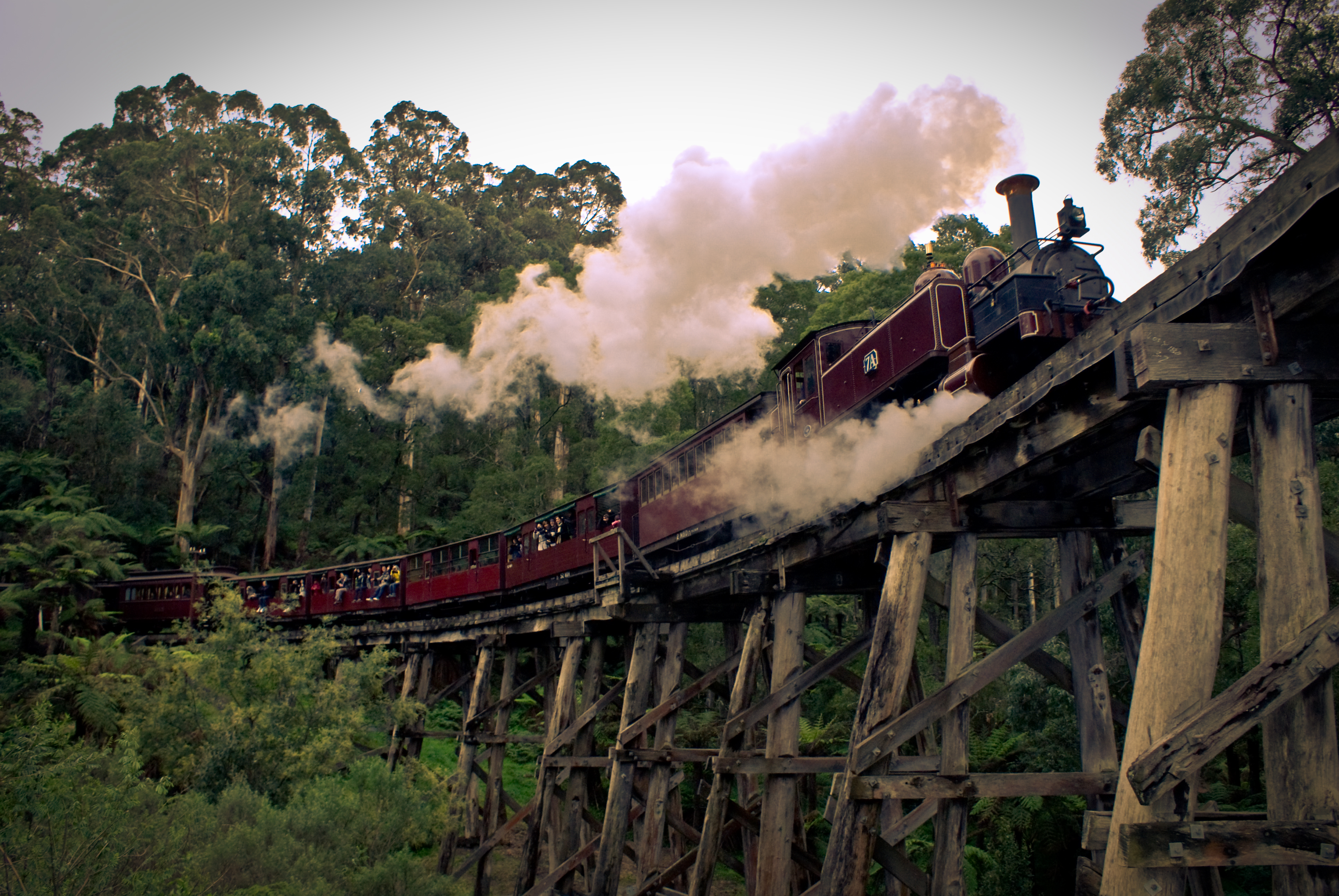
Puffing Billy Railway bridge

The world's second preserved railway, and the first outside the United Kingdom, was Australia's Puffing Billy Railway. This railway operates on 15 miles (24 km) of track, with much of its original rolling stock built as early as 1898. Just about over half of Australia's heritage lines are operated by narrow gauge tank engines, much like the narrow gauge lines of the United Kingdom.

=== Austria ===
The Höllental Railway is a 4.9-kilometre-long (3.0 mi), 760 mm (2 ft 5 15/16 in) narrow-gauge (Bosnian gauge) railway, operating in Lower Austria. It runs on summer weekends, connecting Reichenau an der Rax to the nearby Höllental.

=== Belgium ===
Flanders, Belgium's northern Dutch-speaking region, has the Dendermonde–Puurs Steam Railway; whereas Wallonia, with its strong history of 19th century heavy industries, has the Chemin de fer à vapeur des Trois Vallées and PFT operates the Chemin de Fer du Bocq.

=== Canada ===
==== Tramways ====
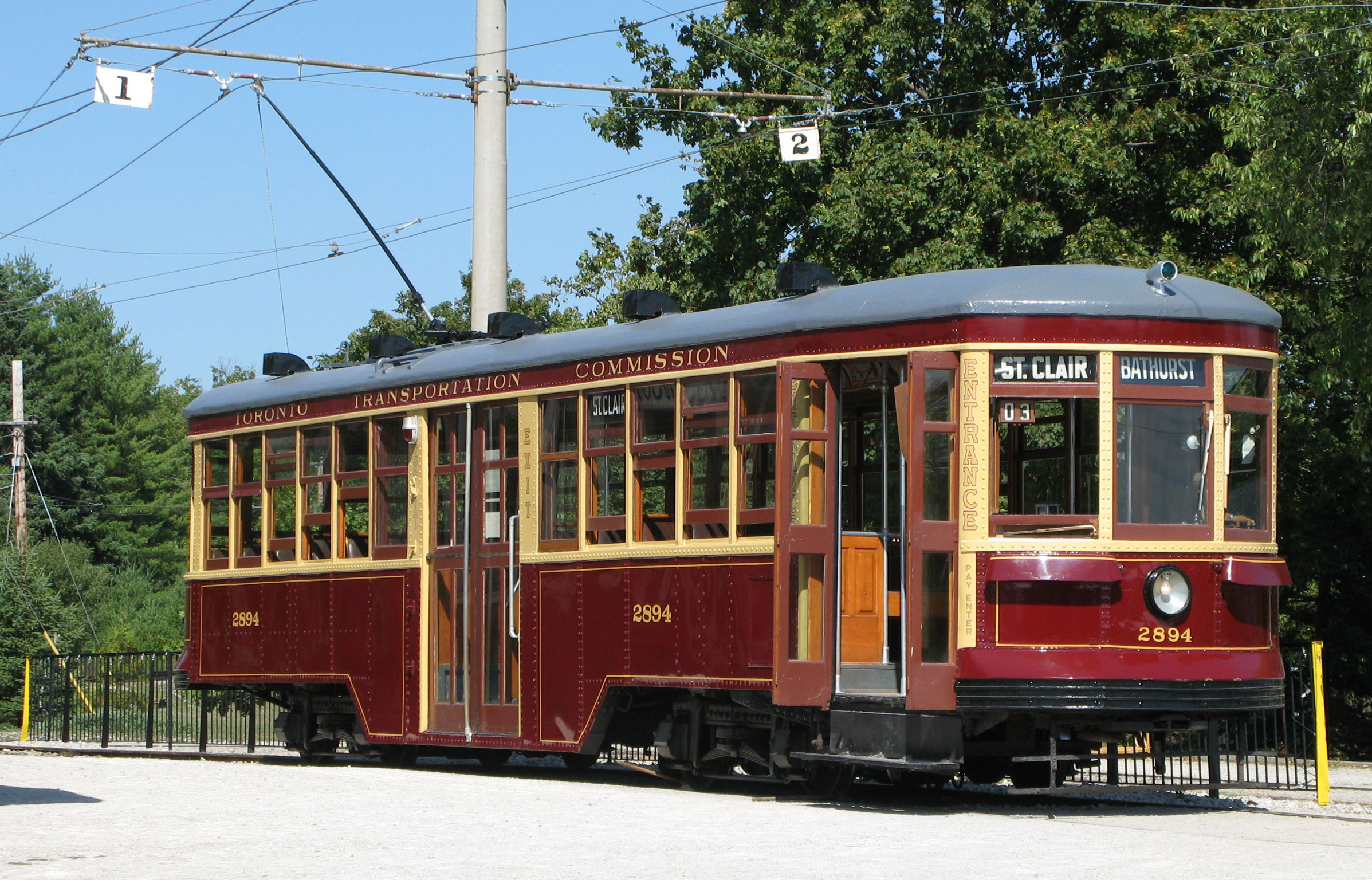
Peter Witt streetcar at the Halton County Radial Railway

Heritage streetcar lines:

- Downtown Historic Railway, in Vancouver, B.C. Replaced temporarily by the Olympic Line during the 2010 Vancouver Olympics, abandoned in 2012.
- Nelson Electric Tramway, in Nelson, B.C.: two streetcars – Car 400 (formerly BCER, owned by the Royal BC Museum, operational since 1999) and Car 23 (operational since 1992) operate on a 1.2 km route from City wharf to Lakeside Park.
- High Level Bridge Streetcar, in Edmonton, Alberta.
- Whitehorse trolley, in Whitehorse, Yukon. Closed in 2019, re-opened in 2024.

Museums with operational heritage streetcar lines:

- Halton County Radial Railway, in Rockwood, Ontario
- Canadian Railway Museum, in Delson/Saint-Constant, Quebec
- Heritage Park Historical Village, in Calgary, Alberta
- Fort Edmonton Park in Edmonton, Alberta, operated by the Edmonton Radial Railway society along with the High Level Bridge Streetcar.

=== Finland ===
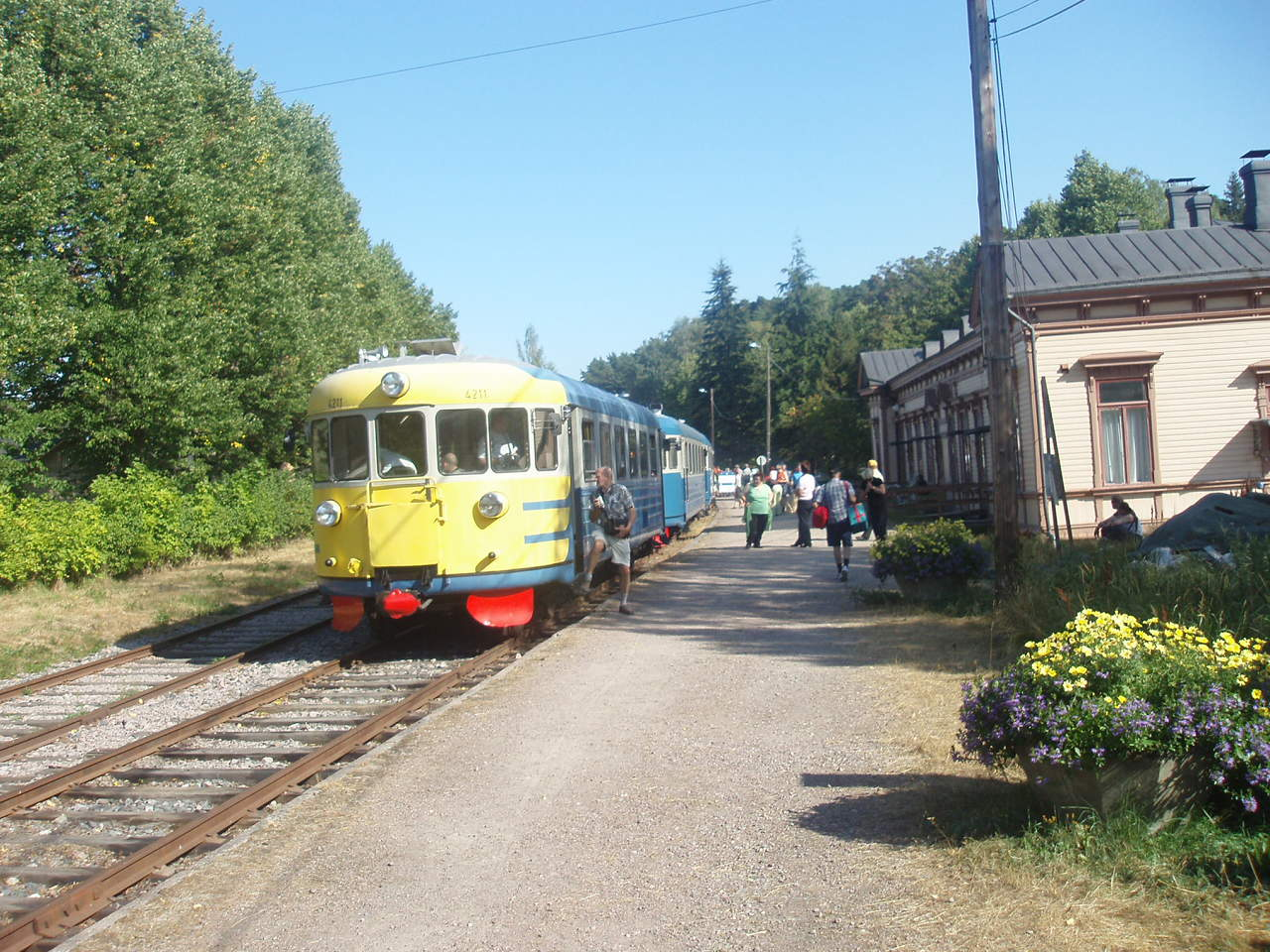
Preserved railbus at the Porvoo railway station

On the Finnish state-owned rail network, the section between Olli and Porvoo is a dedicated museum line. In southern Finland, it is the only line with many structural details abandoned by the rest of the network which regularly carries passenger traffic. Wooden sleepers, gravel ballast and low rail weight with no overhead catenary make it uniquely historical. Along the line, the Hinthaara railway station and the Porvoo railway station area are included in the National Board of Antiquities' inventory of cultural environments of national significance in Finland. Also on the list is scenery in the Porvoonjoki Valley, through which the line passes.

The Jokioinen Museum Railway is a stretch of preserved narrow-gauge railway between Humppila and Jokioinen. Nykarleby Järnväg is a stretch of rebuilt narrow-gauge railway on the bank of the old Kovjoki–Nykarleby line.

=== Germany ===
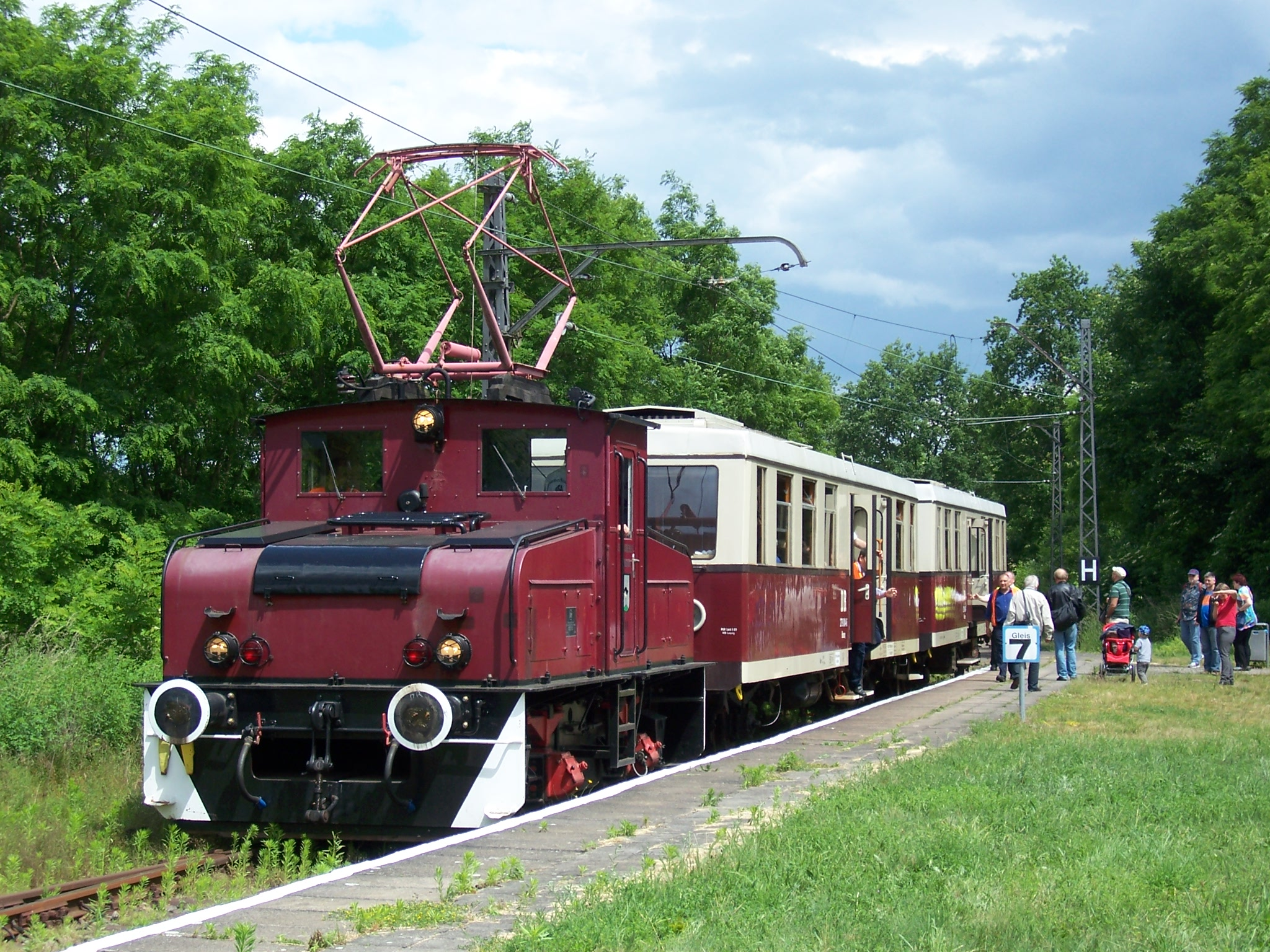
The Buckower Kleinbahn at Müncheberg (Mark) station.

The Buckower Kleinbahn is a 4.9-kilometre (3.0 mi) spur line of the Prussian Eastern Railway, located in the Märkische Schweiz Nature Park in Brandenburg. It was originally constructed in 1897 as a narrow-gauge railway, with a gauge of 750 mm (2 ft 5 1/2 in), connecting Buckow to the Müncheberg (Mark) station. This line was electrified and changed to standard gauge in 1930. It has operated as a heritage railway since 2002.

=== India ===
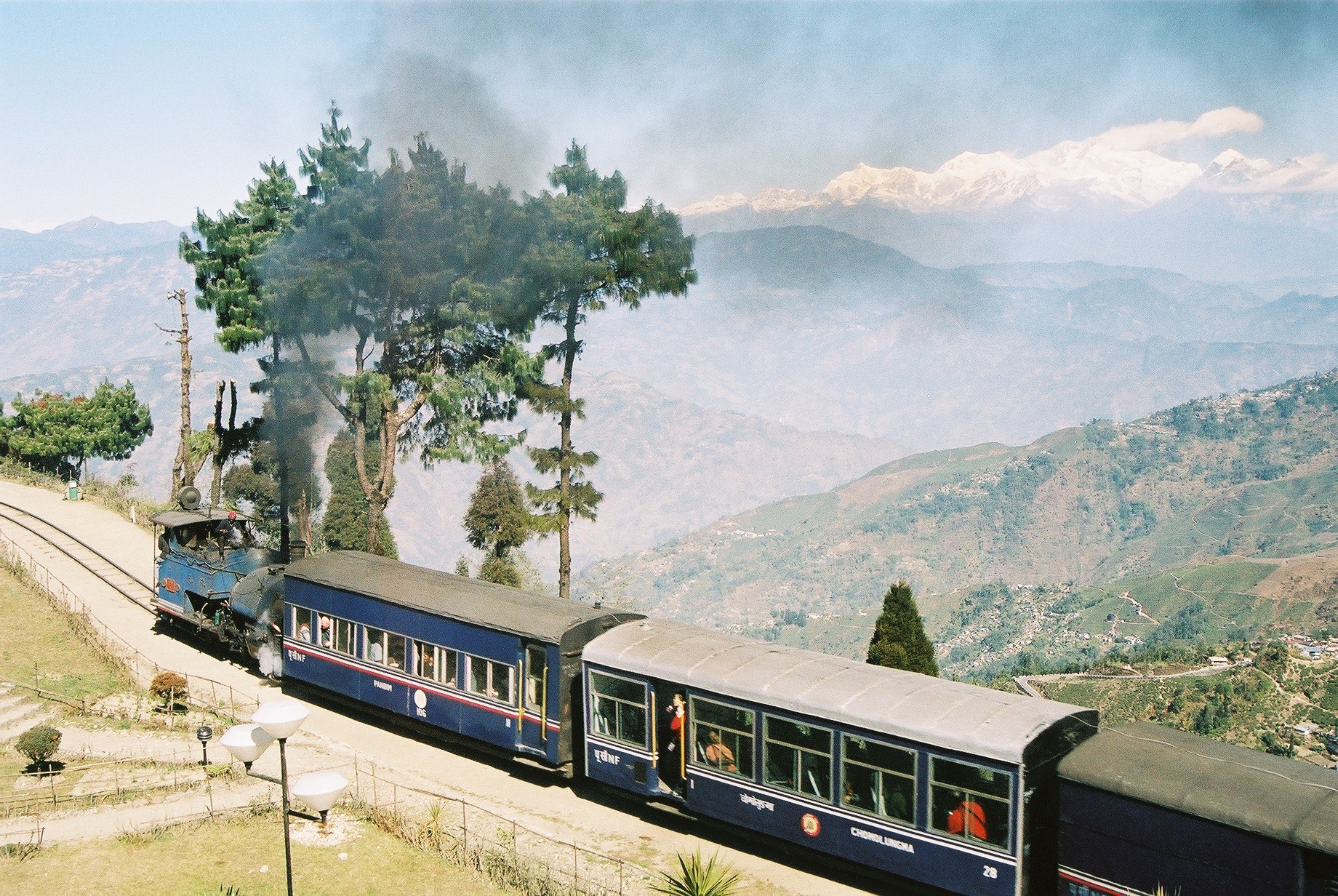
The Darjeeling Himalayan Railway in West Bengal

The Mountain railways of India are the railway lines that were built in the mountainous regions of India. The term mainly includes the narrow-gauge and metre-gauge railways in these regions but may also include some broad-gauge railways.

Of the Mountain railways of India, the Darjeeling Himalayan, Nilgiri Mountain and Kalka–Shimla Railways have been collectively designated as a UNESCO World Heritage Site. To meet World Heritage criteria, the sites must retain some of their traditional infrastructure and culture.

The Nilgiri Mountain Railway is also the only rack and pinion railway in India. The Matheran Hill Railway, along with the Kangra Valley Railway are preserved narrow gauge railways under consideration for UNESCO status. Some scenic routes have been preserved as heritage railways. Here normal services have stopped, only tourist heritage trains are operated. Examples of these are the Patalpani–Kalakund Heritage Train and the Rajasthan Valley Queen Heritage train which runs from Marwar Junction to Khamlighat.

=== Indonesia ===
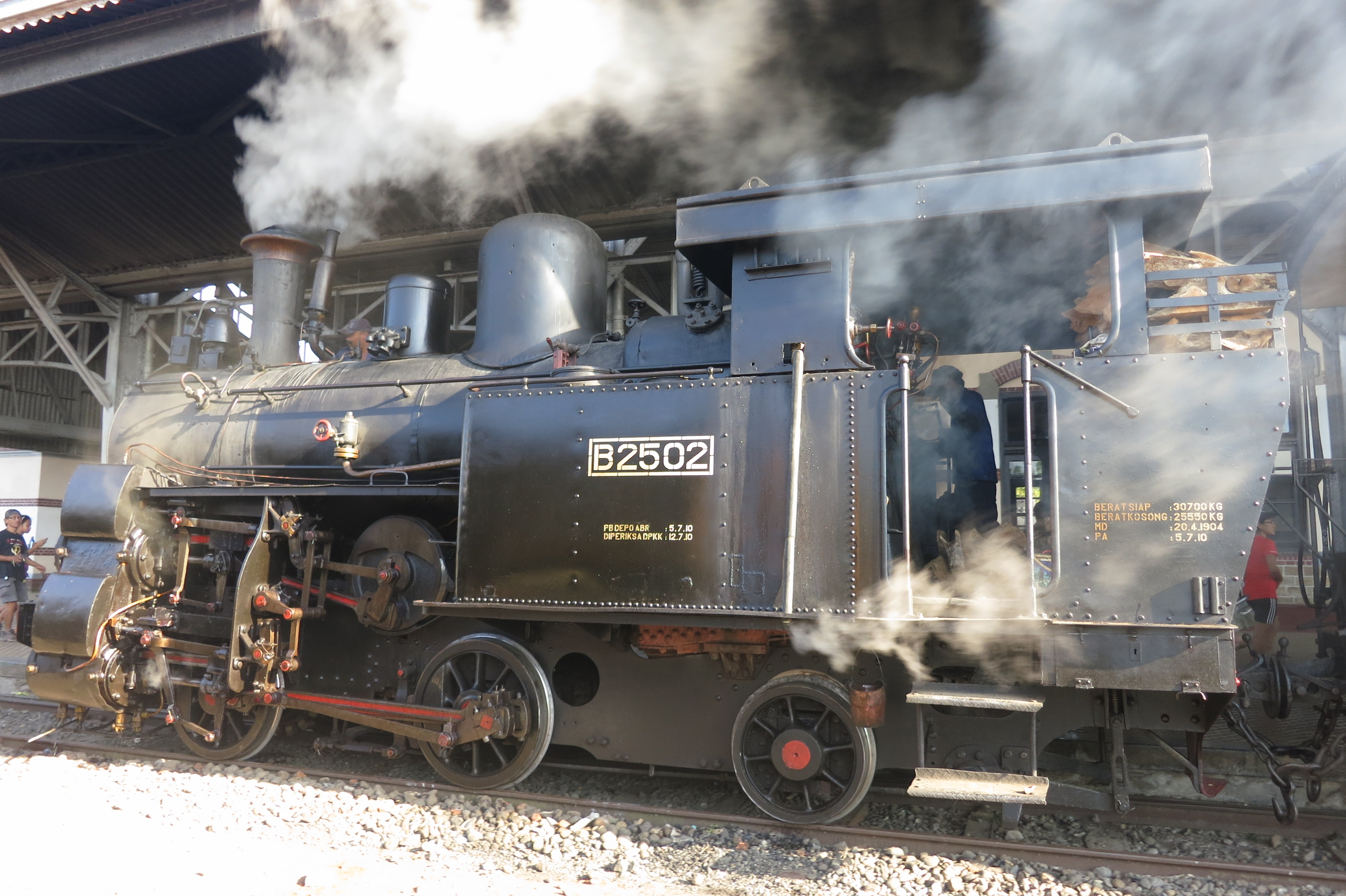
The historical Ambarawa train station that has become a museum

In Indonesia there are several historic train lines and steam trains that are still operated today, including Ambarawa Railway Museum, Sawahlunto Railway Museum, Cepu Forest Railway, Jaladara excursion train in Surakarta, and several narrow gauge lines in the Sugar Factory area.

=== Italy ===
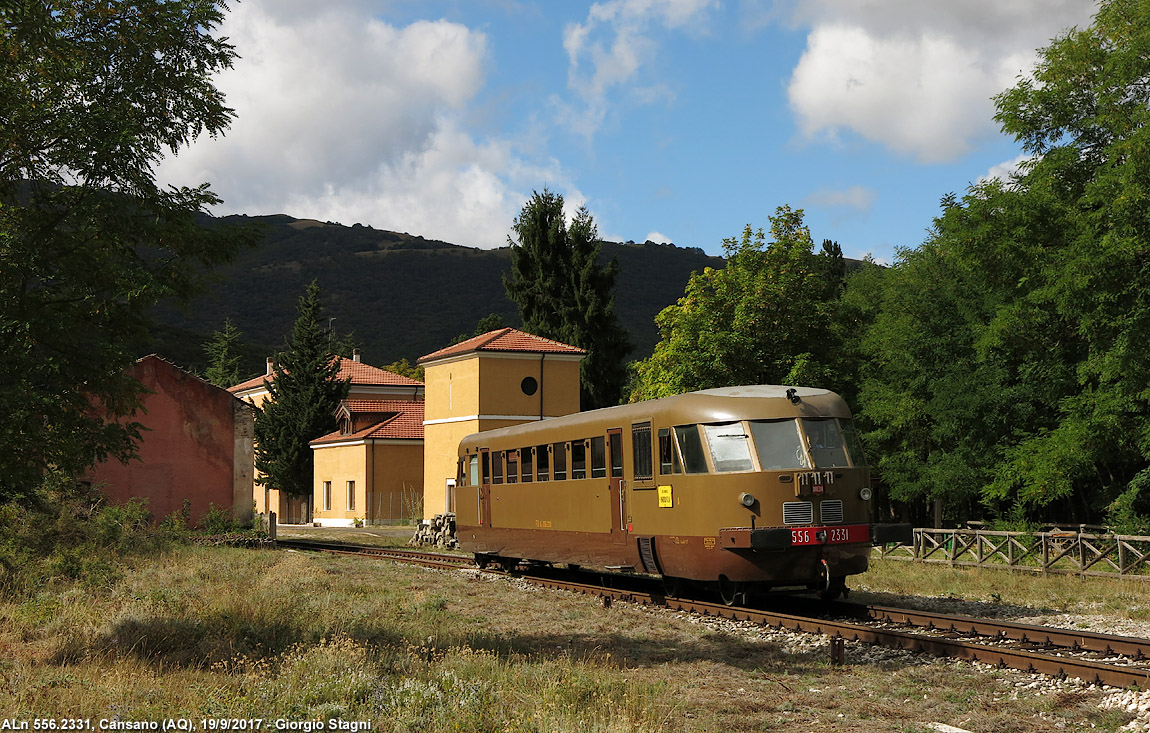
Historic train at the Cansano railway station, along the now tourist Sulmona–Isernia railway in Italy

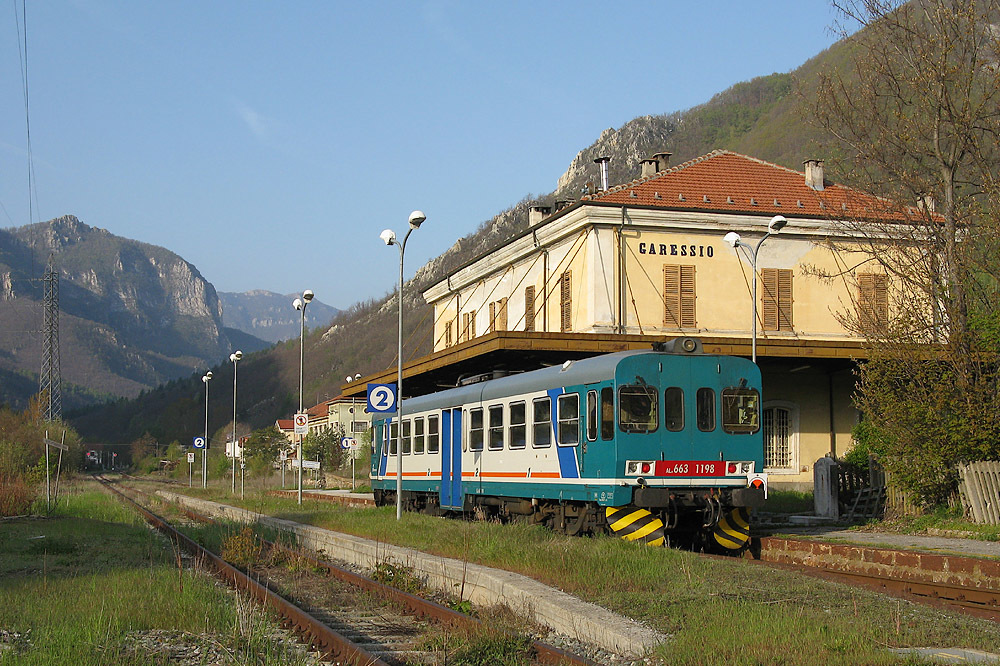
Tourist train in transit on the Ceva–Ormea railway in Italy

In Italy the heritage railway institute is recognized and protected by law no. 128 of 9 August 2017, which has as its objective the protection and valorisation of disused, suspended or abolished railway lines, of particular cultural, landscape and tourist value, including both railway routes and stations and the related works of art and appurtenances, on which, upon proposal of the regions to which they belong, tourism-type traffic management is applied (art. 2, paragraph 1). At the same time, the law identified a first list of 18 tourist railways, considered to be of particular value (art. 2, paragraph 2).

The list is periodically updated by decree of the Ministry of Infrastructure and Transport, in agreement with the Ministry of Economy and Finance and the Ministry of Culture, also taking into account the reports in the State-Regions Conference, a list which in 2022 reached 26 railway lines. According to article 1, law 128/2017 has as its purpose: "the protection and valorisation of railway sections of particular cultural, landscape and tourist value, which include railway routes, stations and related works of art and appurtenances, and of the historic and tourist rolling stock authorized to travel along them, as well as the regulation of the use of ferrocycles".

Below is the list of railway lines recognized as tourist railways by Italian legislation.

a) pursuant to art. 2 paragraph 2 law 128/2017:
1. Sulmona-Castel di Sangro section of the Sulmona–Isernia railway
2. Cosenza-Camigliatello–San Giovanni in Fiore railway
3. Avellino–Rocchetta Sant'Antonio railway
4. Gemona del Friuli–Sacile railway
5. Palazzolo–Paratico railway
6. Castel di Sangro-Carpinone section of the Sulmona-Isernia railway
7. Ceva–Ormea railway
8. Mandas–Arbatax railway
9. Isili–Sorgono railway
10. Sassari–Tempio-Palau railway
11. Macomer–Bosa railway
12. Alcantara–Randazzo railway
13. Castelvetrano-Porto Palo section of the Castelvetrano–Porto Empedocle railway
14. Agrigento Bassa-Porto Empedocle section of the Castelvetrano-Porto Empedocle railway
15. Noto–Pachino railway
16. Asciano–Monte Antico railway
17. Civitavecchia–Orte railway
18. Fano–Urbino railway

b) pursuant to the Ministerial Decree of 30 March 2022:

1. Chivasso–Asti railway
2. Castagnole–Asti-Mortara railway
3. Alba-Nizza Monferrato section of the Alessandria–Cavallermaggiore railway
4. Novara–Varallo railway
5. Fabriano-Pergola section of the Urbino–Fabriano railway
6. Sicignano degli Alburni–Lagonegro railway
7. Rocchetta Sant'Antonio–Gioia del Colle railway
8. Cuneo–Mondovì railway
9. Malnate Olona-Swiss border section of the Valmorea railway.

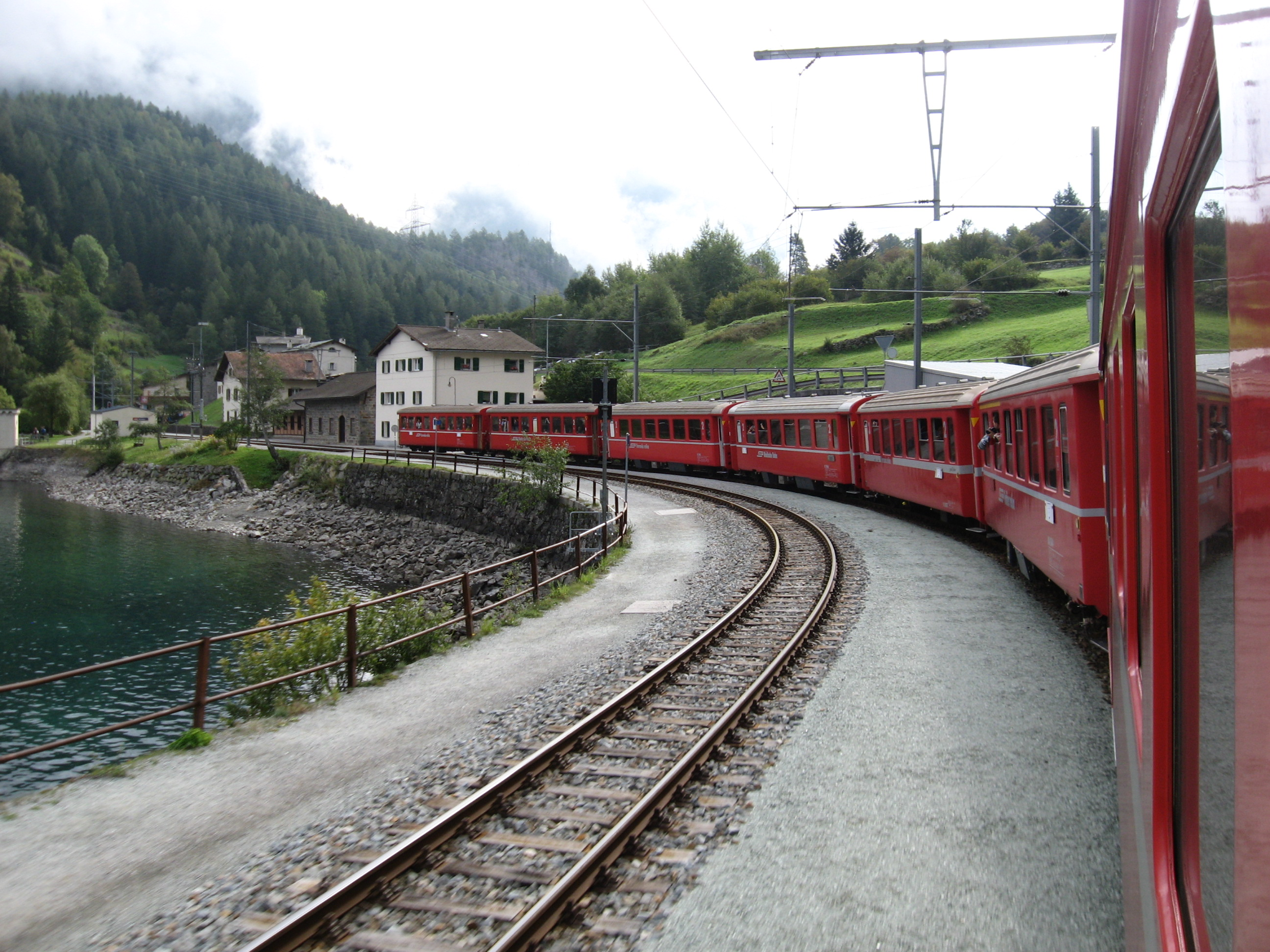
Bernina railway line between Poschiavo, Switzerland, and Tirano, Italy

The Bernina railway line is a single-track 1,000 mm (3 ft 3 3/8 in) metre gauge railway line forming part of the Rhaetian Railway (RhB). It links the spa resort of St. Moritz, in the canton of Graubünden, Switzerland, with the town of Tirano, in the Province of Sondrio, Italy, via the Bernina Pass. Reaching a height of 2,253 metres (7,392 ft) above sea level, it is the third highest railway crossing in Europe. It also ranks as the highest adhesion railway of the continent, and – with inclines of up to 7% – as one of the steepest adhesion railways in the world. The elevation difference on the section between the Bernina Pass and Tirano is 1,824 m (5,984 ft), allowing passengers to view glaciers along the line. On 7 July 2008, the Bernina line and the Albula railway line, which also forms part of the RhB, were recorded in the list of UNESCO World Heritage Sites, under the name Rhaetian Railway in the Albula / Bernina Landscapes. The whole site is a cross-border joint Swiss-Italian heritage area. Trains operating on the Bernina line include the Bernina Express.

In July 2023, Ferrovie dello Stato established a new company, the "FS Treni Turistici Italiani" (English: FS Italian Tourist Trains), with the mission "to propose an offer of railway services expressly designed and calibrated for quality, sustainable tourism and attentive to rediscovering the riches of the Italian territory. Tourism that can experience the train journey as an integral moment of the holiday, an element of quality in the overall tourist experience". There are three service areas proposed:

- Luxury trains, which includes the circulation of the "Orient Express - La Dolce Vita" from 2024, and Venice Simplon Orient Express, already operating on European routes;
- Express and historic trains, with the express trains of the 1980s and 1990s which being redeveloped and modernized in the railway workshops of Rimini, while the historic trains are used for journeys that include stops with guided tours and tastings;
- Regional trains, also with trips that include experiential tourist stops, which pass through places rich in history, with villages and areas of landscape, naturalistic, food and wine and agri-food interest.

=== New Zealand ===
Rail transport played a major role in the history of New Zealand and several rail enthusiast societies and heritage railways have been formed to preserve New Zealand's rich rail history. The very first example was the Ocean Beach Railway, which was established by the Otago Branch of the New Zealand Railway and Locomotive Society in 1960. The first locomotive to run at the OBR, and the first locomotive to run in preservation in New Zealand, was PWD Fowler No. 540, in 1961.

=== Slovakia ===
The Čierny Hron Railway is a narrow-gauge railway in central Slovakia, established in the first decade of the 20th century and operating primarily as a freight railway for the local logging industry. From the late 1920s to the early 1960s, it also offered passenger transport between the villages of Hronec and Čierny Balog. The railway became Czechoslovakia's most extensive forest railway network. After its closure in 1982, it received heritage status and was restored during the following decade. Since 1992, it has been one of Slovakia's official heritage railways and is a key regional tourist attraction. The Historical Logging Switchback Railway in Vychylovka is a heritage railway in north-central Slovakia, originally built to serve the logging industry in the Orava and Kysuce regions. Despite a closure and dissassembly of most of its original network during the early 1970s, its surviving lines and branches have been (or are being) restored. The railway is owned and operated by the Museum of Kysuce, with a 3.8-kilometre (2.4 mi) line open to tourists for sightseeing.

=== Switzerland ===
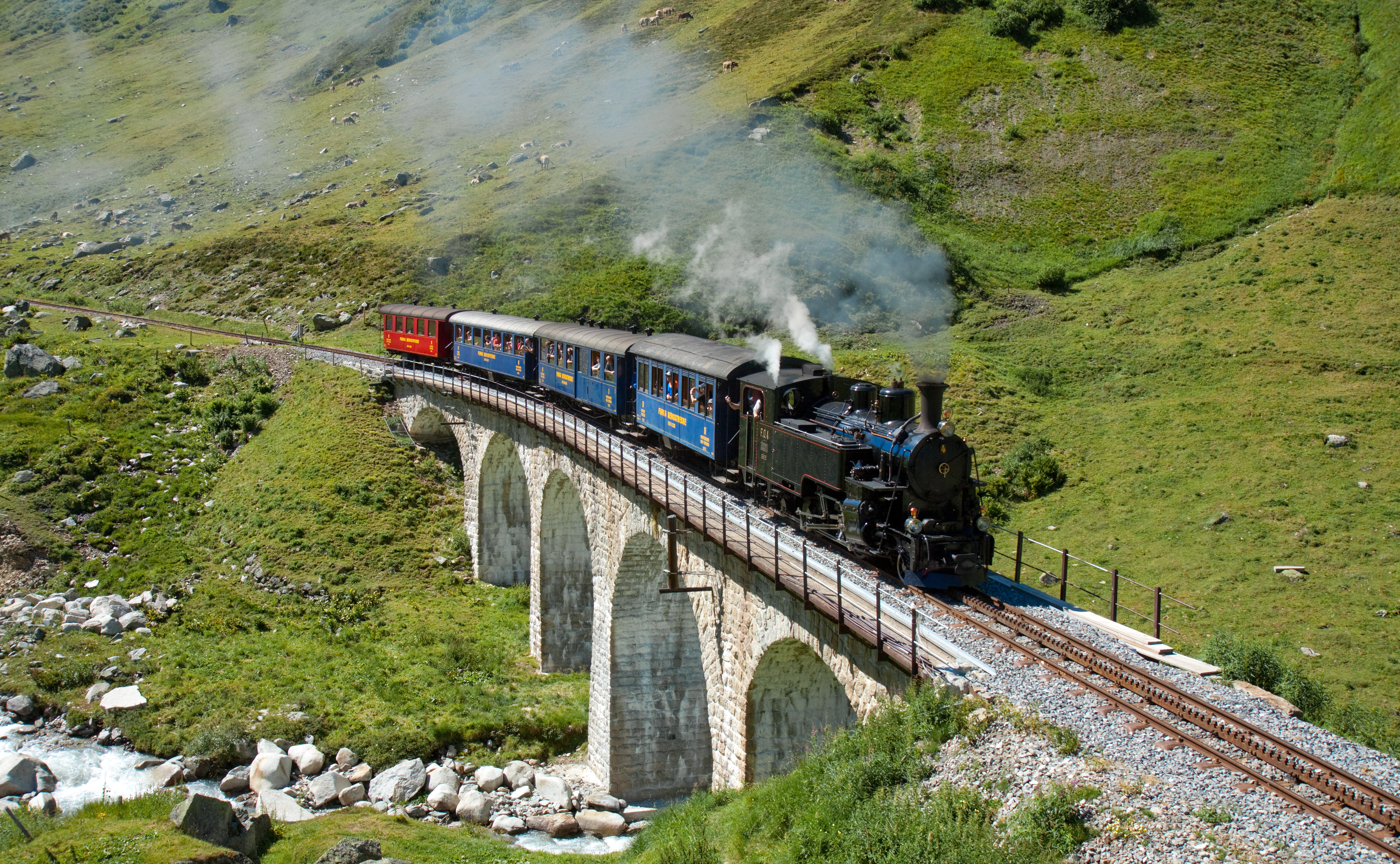
The Furka Steam Railway

Switzerland has a very dense rail network, both standard and narrow gauge. The overwhelming majority of railways, built between the mid-19th and early 20th century, are still in regular operation today and electrified, a major exception being the Furka Steam Railway, the longest unelectrified line in the country and one of the highest rail crossings in Europe. Many railway companies, especially mountain railways, provide services with well-preserved historic trains for tourists, for instance the Rigi Railways, the oldest rack railway in Europe, and the Pilatus Railway, the steepest in the world. Two railways, the Albula Railway and the Bernina Railway, have been designated as a World Heritage Site, although they are essentially operated with modern rolling stock. Due to the availability of hydroelectric resources in the Alps, the Swiss network was electrified earlier than in the rest of Europe. Some of the most emblematic pre-World War II electric locomotives and trains are the Crocodile, notably used on the Gotthard Railway, and the Red Arrow. Both are occasionally operated by SBB Historic. Switzerland also comprehends a large number of funiculars, several still working with the original carriages, such as the Giessbachbahn.

=== United Kingdom ===
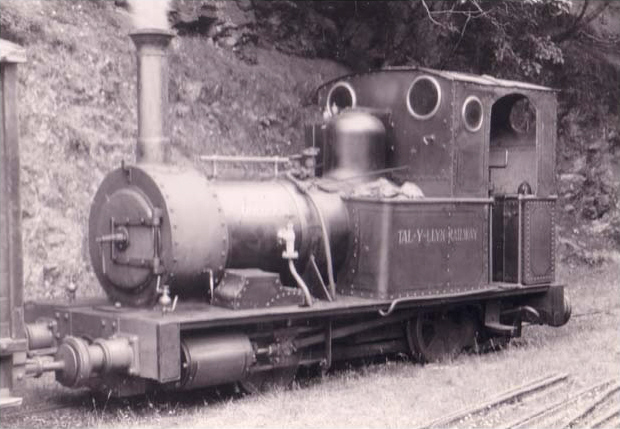
The Talyllyn Railway in 1951, the year it opened as a heritage railway

In Britain, heritage railways are often railway lines which were run as commercial railways but were no longer needed (or closed down) and were taken over or re-opened by volunteers or non-profit organisations. The large number of heritage railways in the UK is due in part to the closure of many minor lines during the 1960s' Beeching cuts, and they were relatively easy to revive. There are between 100 and 150 heritage railways in the United Kingdom.

A typical British heritage railway will use steam locomotives and original rolling stock to create a period atmosphere, although some are concentrating on diesel and electric traction to re-create the post-steam era. Many run seasonally on partial routes, unconnected to a larger network (or railway), and charge high fares in comparison with transit services; as a result, they focus on the tourist and leisure markets. During the 1990s and 2000s, however, some heritage railways aimed to provide local transportation and extend their running seasons to carry commercial passenger traffic.

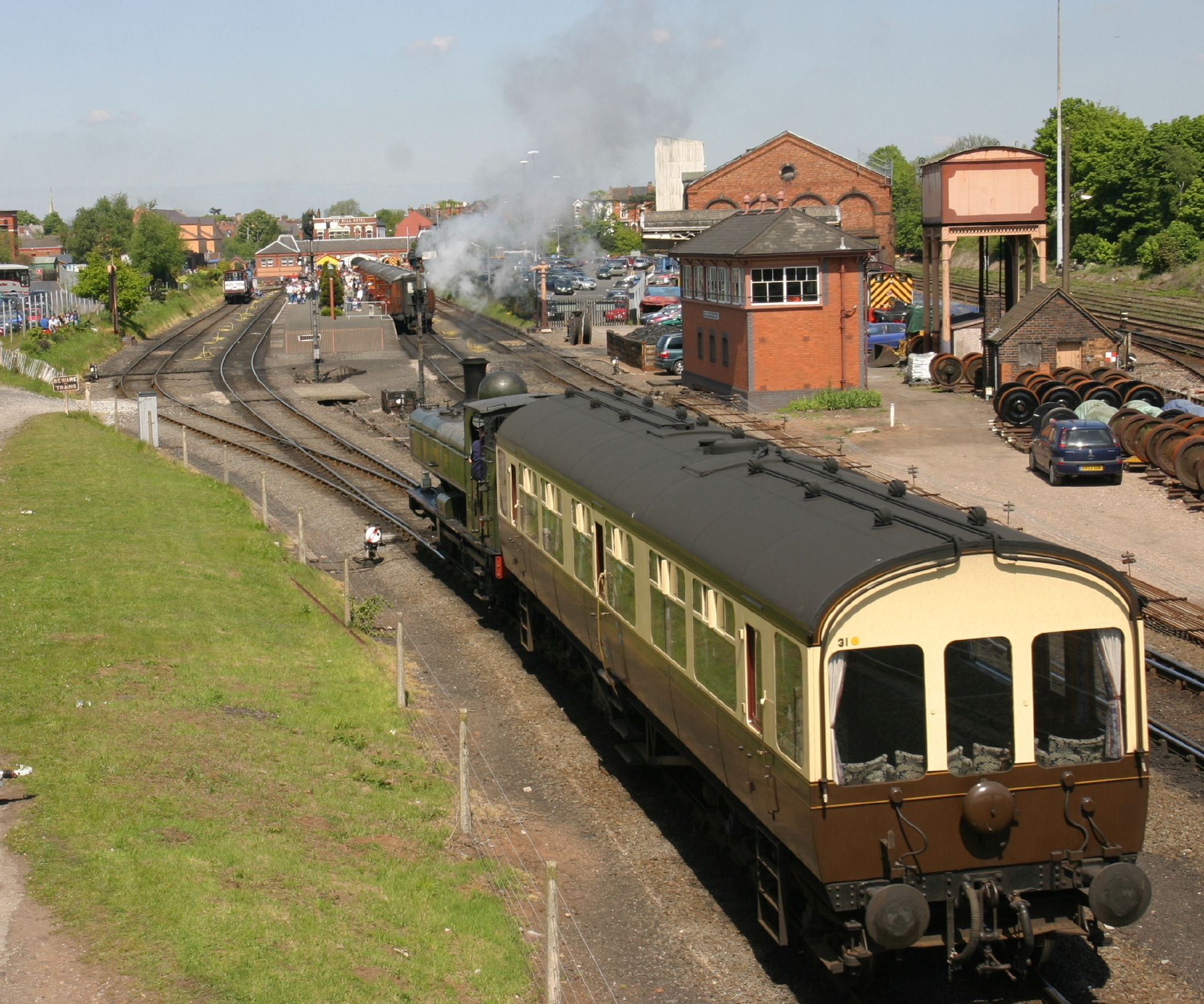
Severn Valley Railway

The first standard-gauge line to be preserved (not a victim of Beeching) was the Middleton Railway; the second, and the first to carry passengers, was the Bluebell Railway.

Not-for-profit heritage railways differ in their quantity of service and some lines see traffic only on summer weekends. The more successful, such as the Severn Valley Railway and the North Yorkshire Moors Railway, may have up to five or six steam locomotives and operate a four-train service daily; smaller railways may run daily throughout the summer with only one steam locomotive. The Great Central Railway, the only preserved British main line with a double track, can operate over 50 trains on a busy timetable day.

After the privatisation of main-line railways, the line between not-for-profit heritage railways and for-profit branch lines may be blurred. The Romney, Hythe and Dymchurch Railway is an example of a commercial line run as a heritage operation and to provide local transportation, and the Severn Valley Railway has operated a few goods trains commercially. A number of heritage railway lines are regularly used by commercial freight operators.

Since the Bluebell Railway reopened to traffic in 1960, the definition of private standard gauge railways in the United Kingdom as preserved railways has evolved as the number of projects and their length, operating days and function have changed. The situation is further muddied by large variations in ownership-company structure, rolling stock and other assets. Unlike community railways, tourist railways in the UK are vertically integrated (although those operating mainly as charities separate their charitable and non-charitable activities for accounting purposes).

=== United States ===
==== Railroads ====
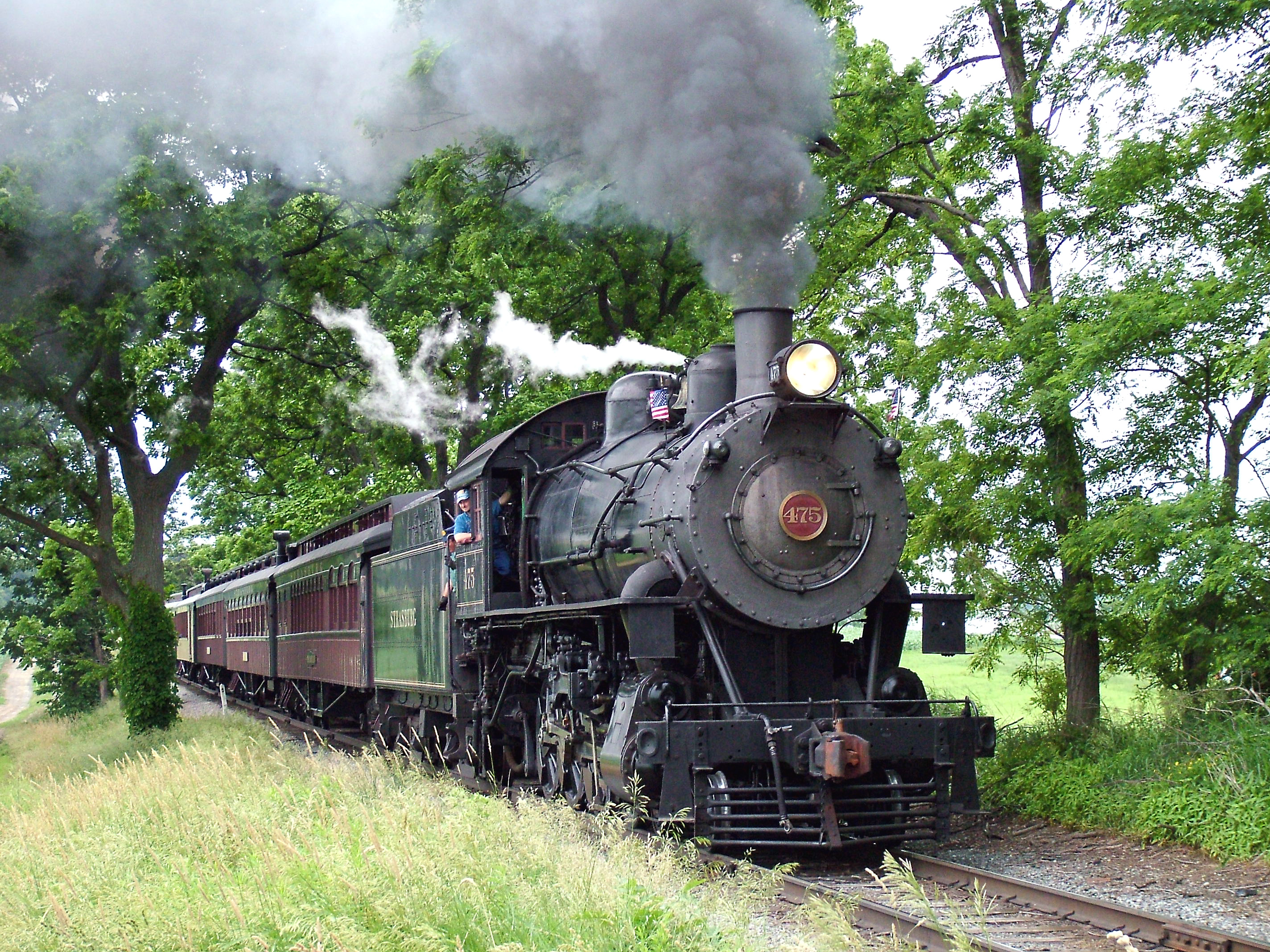
Norfolk & Western M Class No. 475 pulls an excursion on the Strasburg Railroad in Pennsylvania.

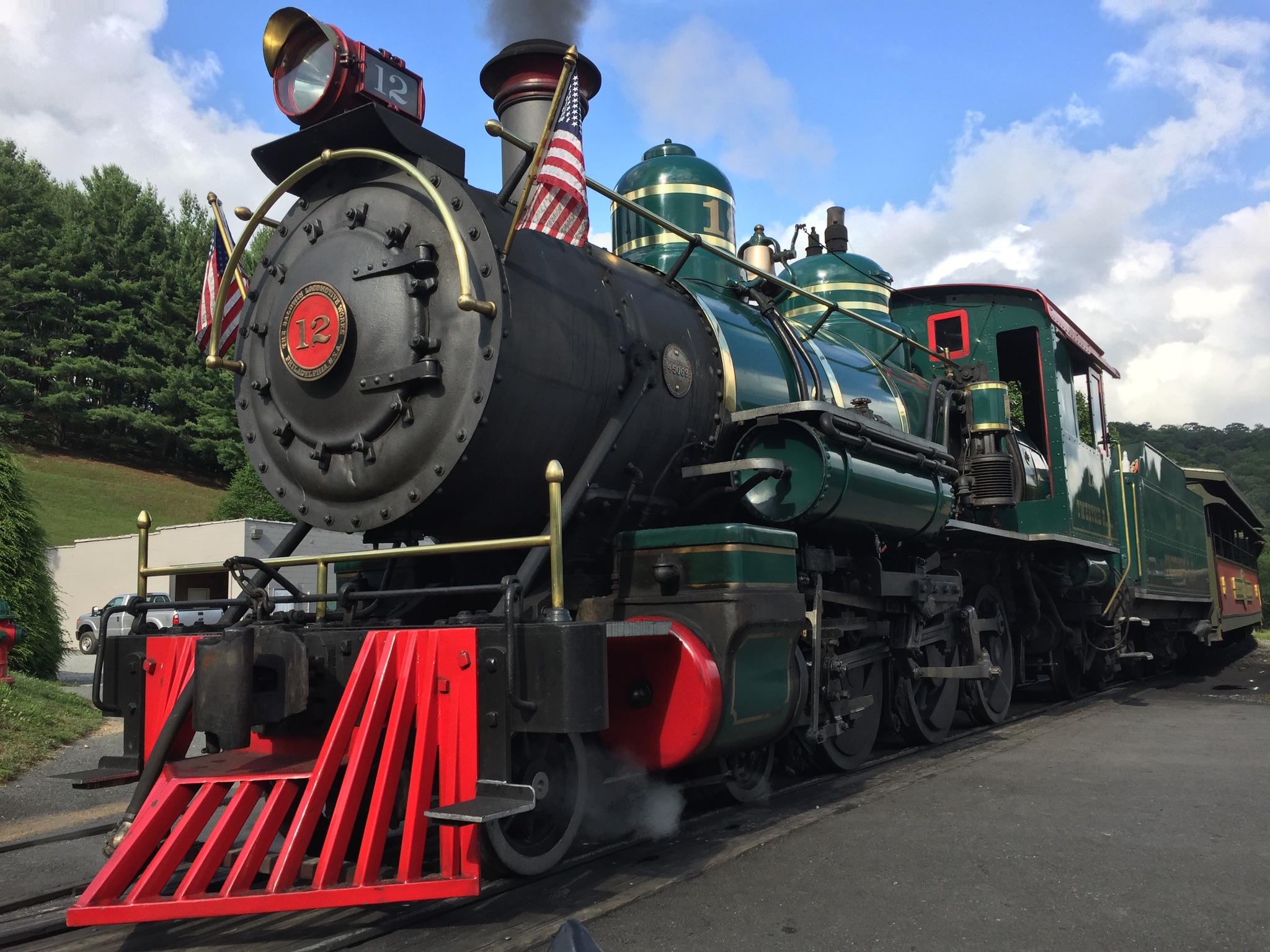
Tweetsie Railroad locomotive

Heritage railways are known in the United States as tourist, historic, or scenic railroads. Most are remnants of original railroads, and some are reconstructed after having been scrapped. Some heritage railways preserve entire railroads in their original state using original structures, track, and motive power.

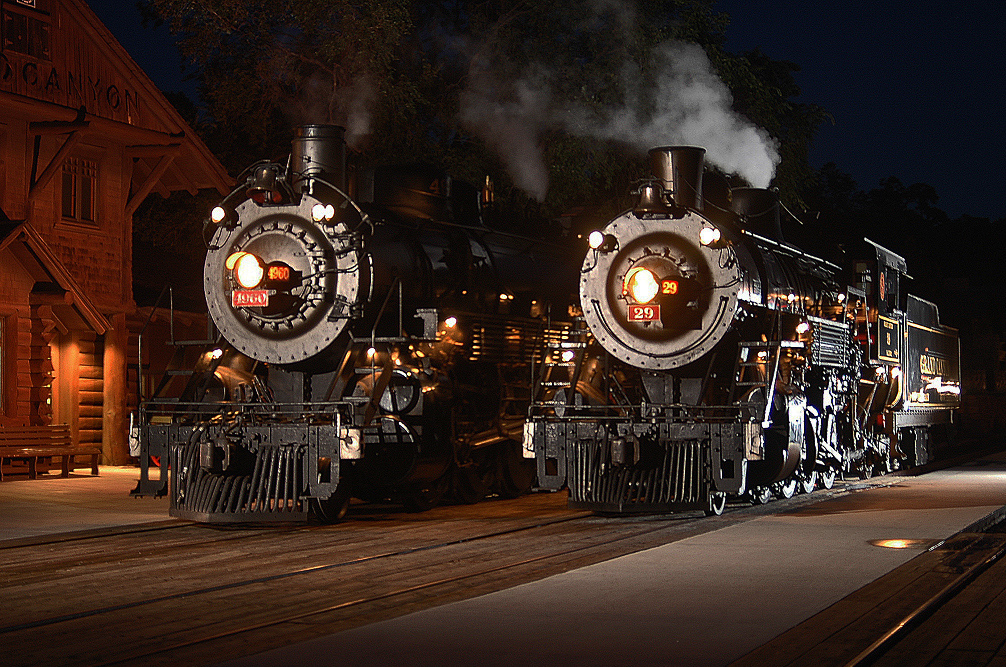
Grand Canyon Railway night photo session

Examples of heritage railroads in the US by preservation type:

Original

- East Broad Top Railroad and Coal Company (Pennsylvania)
- Nevada Northern Railway (Nevada)
- California Western Railroad (California)
- Stewartstown Railroad (Pennsylvania)
- Arcade and Attica Railroad (New York)

Remnant

- Durango and Silverton Railroad (Colorado)
- Cumbres and Toltec Scenic Railroad (Colorado and New Mexico)
- Hocking Valley Scenic Railway (Ohio)
- Tennessee Valley Railroad Museum (Tennessee)
- Strasburg Rail Road (Pennsylvania)
- Fox River Trolley Museum (Illinois)

Reconstructed

- Sumpter Valley Railway (Oregon)
- Tweetsie Railroad (North Carolina)
- Virginia and Truckee Railroad (Nevada)
- Wiscasset, Waterville and Farmington Railway (Maine)
- Fort Collins Municipal Railway (Colorado)
- Georgetown Loop Railroad (Colorado)

National Park Related Lines

- Steamtown National Historic Site (Pennsylvania)
- Grand Canyon Railway (Arizona)
- Cuyahoga Valley Scenic Railroad (Ohio)
- Golden Spike National Historical Park (Utah)

Other operations, such as the Valley Railroad or Hocking Valley Scenic Railway operate on historic track and utilize historic equipment, but are not reflective of the operations carried out by the original railroad they operate on. Hence, they do not fit into the Heritage Railway category, but rather Tourist Railway/Amusement.

==== Tramways ====
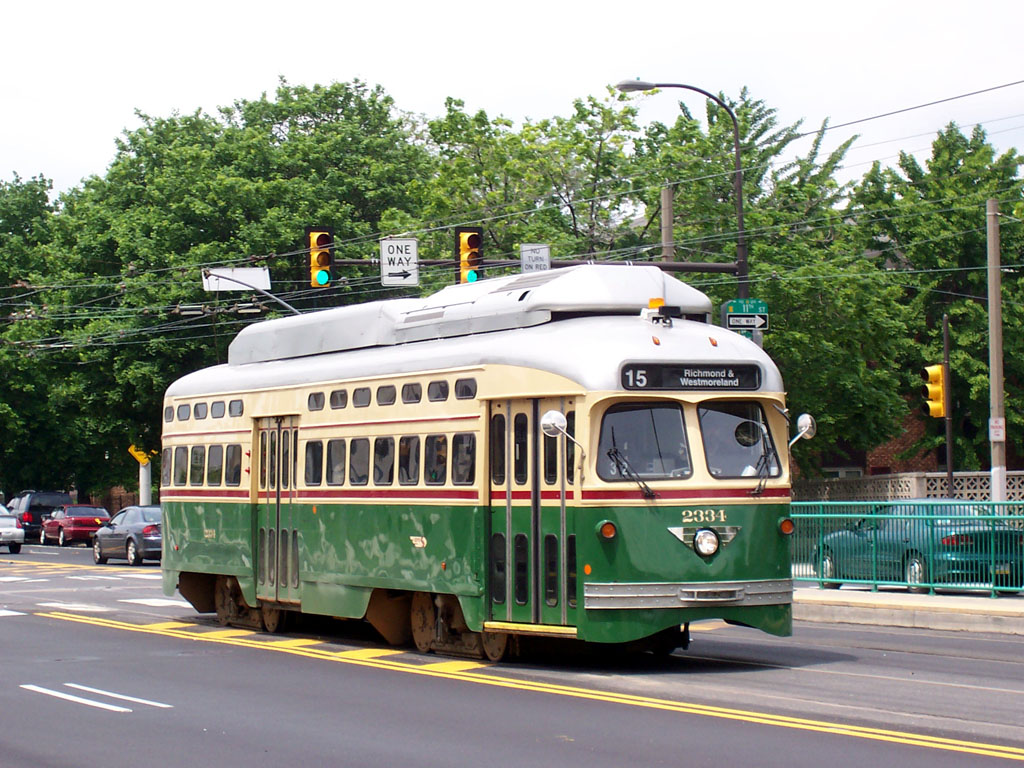
A SEPTA route 15 PCC trolley in Philadelphia around 2006

Heritage streetcar lines are operating in over 20 U.S. cities, and are in planning or construction stages in others. Several new heritage streetcar lines have been opened since the 1970s; some are stand-alone lines while others make use of a section of a modern light rail system.

Heritage streetcar systems operating in Little Rock, Arkansas; Memphis, Tennessee; Dallas, Texas; New Orleans, Louisiana; Boston, Massachusetts (MBTA Mattapan Trolley) Philadelphia, Pennsylvania (SEPTA route 15); and Tampa, Florida, are among the larger examples. A heritage line operates in Charlotte, North Carolina, and will become a part of the city's new transit system. Another such line, called The Silver Line, operates in San Diego.

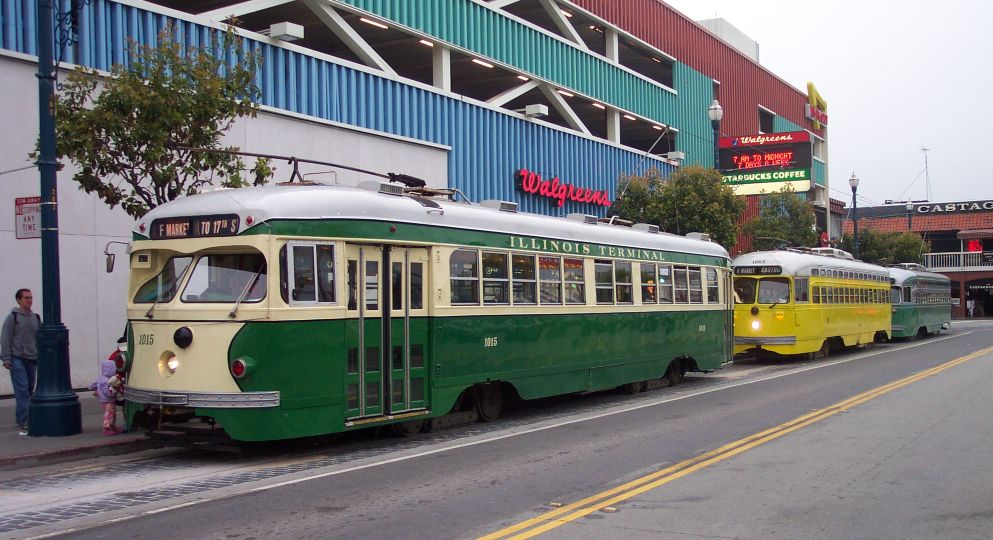
Three PCCs on the San Francisco Municipal Railway's F-line in 2003. Pictured are an example of one double-ended streetcar and two single-ended cars.

The San Francisco Municipal Railway, or Muni, runs exclusively historic trolleys on its heavily used F Market & Wharves line. The line serves Market Street and the tourist areas along the Embarcadero, including Fisherman's Wharf.

Boston's Massachusetts Bay Transportation Authority runs exclusively PCC streetcars on its Mattapan Line, part of that authority's Red Line. The historic rolling stock is retained because doing so cost less than would a full rebuild of the line to accommodate either a heavy rail line (like the rest of the Red Line or the Blue or Orange Lines) or a modern light rail line (like the Green Line). It is also unique in that it used almost exclusively by commuters and is not particularly popular with tourists (and thus may not really be a true heritage system, despite the historic rolling stock).

Dallas has the M-Line Trolley. Denver has the Platte Valley Trolley, a heritage line recalling the open-sided streetcars of the early 20th century. Old Pueblo Trolley is a volunteer-run heritage line in Tucson, Arizona; its popularity inspired, in large part, a modern streetcar system for Tucson currently in the final planning stages, which would incorporate the heritage line. The VTA in San Jose, California, also maintains a heritage trolley fleet, for occasional use on the downtown portion of a new light rail system opened in 1988. Other cities with heritage streetcar lines include Galveston, Texas; Kenosha, Wisconsin; and San Pedro, California (home of the port of Los Angeles). The National Park Service operates a system in Lowell, Massachusetts.

Most heritage streetcar lines use overhead trolley wires to power the cars, as was the case with the vast majority of original streetcar lines. However, on the Galveston Island Trolley heritage line, which opened in 1988, using modern-day replicas of vintage trolleys, the cars were powered by an on-board diesel engine, as local authorities were concerned that overhead wires would be too susceptible to damage from hurricanes. In spite of that precaution, damage in 2008 from Hurricane Ike was heavy enough to put the line out of service indefinitely, and as of 2021 it has yet to reopen, but three streetcars are being repaired and reopening is planned.

Another heritage line lacking trolley wires was Savannah's River Street Streetcar line, which opened in February 2009 and operated until around 2015. It was the first line to use a diesel/electric streetcar whose built-in electricity generator is powered by biodiesel. In El Reno, Oklahoma, the Heritage Express Trolley connects Heritage Park with downtown, using a single streetcar that has been equipped with a propane-powered on-board generator. The car formerly operated on SEPTA's Norristown High Speed Line, where third-rail current collection is used. The El Reno line is single-track and 0.9 miles (1.4 km) long.

In Portland, Oregon, replica-vintage cars provided a heritage streetcar service, named Portland Vintage Trolley, along a section of that city's 1986-operated light rail line from 1991 to 2014. Elsewhere in Portland, the Willamette Shore Trolley is a seasonal, volunteer-operated excursion service on a former freight railroad line, to Lake Oswego, Oregon. This operation uses a diesel-powered generator on a trailer towed or pushed by the streetcar, as the line lacks trolley wires. Similarly, the Astoria Riverfront Trolley in Astoria, Oregon, is a seasonal heritage-trolley service along a section of former freight railroad and using a diesel-powered generator on a trailer to provide electricity to the streetcar.

Other seasonal or weekends-only heritage streetcar lines operate in Yakima, Washington (Yakima Electric Railway Museum); Fort Collins, Colorado; and Fort Smith, Arkansas. The Fort Collins and Fort Smith lines are both operated by an original (as opposed to replica) Birney-type streetcar, and in both cases the individual car in use is listed on the National Register of Historic Places. In Philadelphia, the Penn's Landing Trolley operated seasonal and weekend service as a volunteer operation with former P&W equipment between September 1982 and December 17, 1995, on the Philadelphia Belt Line track on Christopher Columbus Boulevard in the historic Penn's Landing district.

Over 50 years later, the revival of extended streetcar operations in New Orleans is credited by many to the worldwide fame gained by its streetcars built by the Perley A. Thomas Car Works in 1922–23. These cars were operating on the system's Desire route made famous by Tennessee Williams' A Streetcar Named Desire. Some Perley Thomas cars were maintained in continuous service on the St. Charles Streetcar Line until Hurricane Katrina caused major damage to the right-of-way in 2005. The historic streetcars suffered only minor damage and several were transferred to serve on the, then recently rebuilt, Canal Street line while the St. Charles line was being repaired. By June 22, 2008, service was restored to the entire length of the St. Charles Streetcar line. The New Orleans' St. Charles streetcar line is a National Historic Landmark. Pre-Katrina, New Orleans had plans to reconstruct the Desire line along its original route down St. Claude Avenue. Instead, the Loyola-UPT line was extended by building a spur down North Rampart Street to Elysian Fields Avenue.

In San Francisco, parts of the cable car and Muni streetcar system (specifically the above-mentioned F Market & Wharves line) are heritage lines, although they are also functioning parts of the city's transit system. The cable cars are a National Historic Landmark and are rare examples of vehicles with this distinction. Located east of San Francisco is one of several museums in the U.S. that restore and operate vintage streetcars and interurbans, the Western Railway Museum.

== In popular culture ==
The preservation of the Talyllyn Railway was the inspiration for the 1953 Ealing Studios comedy The Titfield Thunderbolt. The film is centred on the preservation of a fictional Somerset branch line from Titfield to Mallingford. Filmed on the Camerton branch in the summer of 1952, the branch was lifted after production had finished.

Many preserved railways also served as a filming location for several production companies; for example, the Keighley and Worth Valley Railway served as a filming location for the 1970 adaptation of The Railway Children.

Series three of Survivors uses heritage railways to help reestablish transportation, communication and trade in post-apocalyptic England.

== See also ==
- Heritage streetcar
- List of heritage railways
- Neo-Victorian
- Restored train
- Gandy dancer
- Wilbert Awdry
