= Castelvetrano–Porto Empedocle railway =

Overview
- Native name: Ferrovia Castelvetrano-Porto Empedocle
- Status: Closed
- Locale: Sicily, Italy
- Termini: Castelvetrano; Porto Empedocle Centrale

Technical
- Line length: 123.1 km (76.5 mi)
- Track gauge: 950 mm (3 ft 1 3/8 in)

The Castelvetrano–Porto Empedocle railway (Italian: Ferrovia Castelvetrano-Porto Empedocle) was a narrow gauge railway that connected Castelvetrano, in the Province of Trapani with Agrigento, following a partly coastal route in south-western Sicily, Italy.

== History ==
=== The end of the line ===
The RALn 60s continued to carry out the few passenger services between Castelvetrano and Ribera, while the last R.302s of the Castelvetrano Locomotive Depot, with mixed coal/oil fuel, the last steam services in Italy, were entrusted with the traction of freight trains.

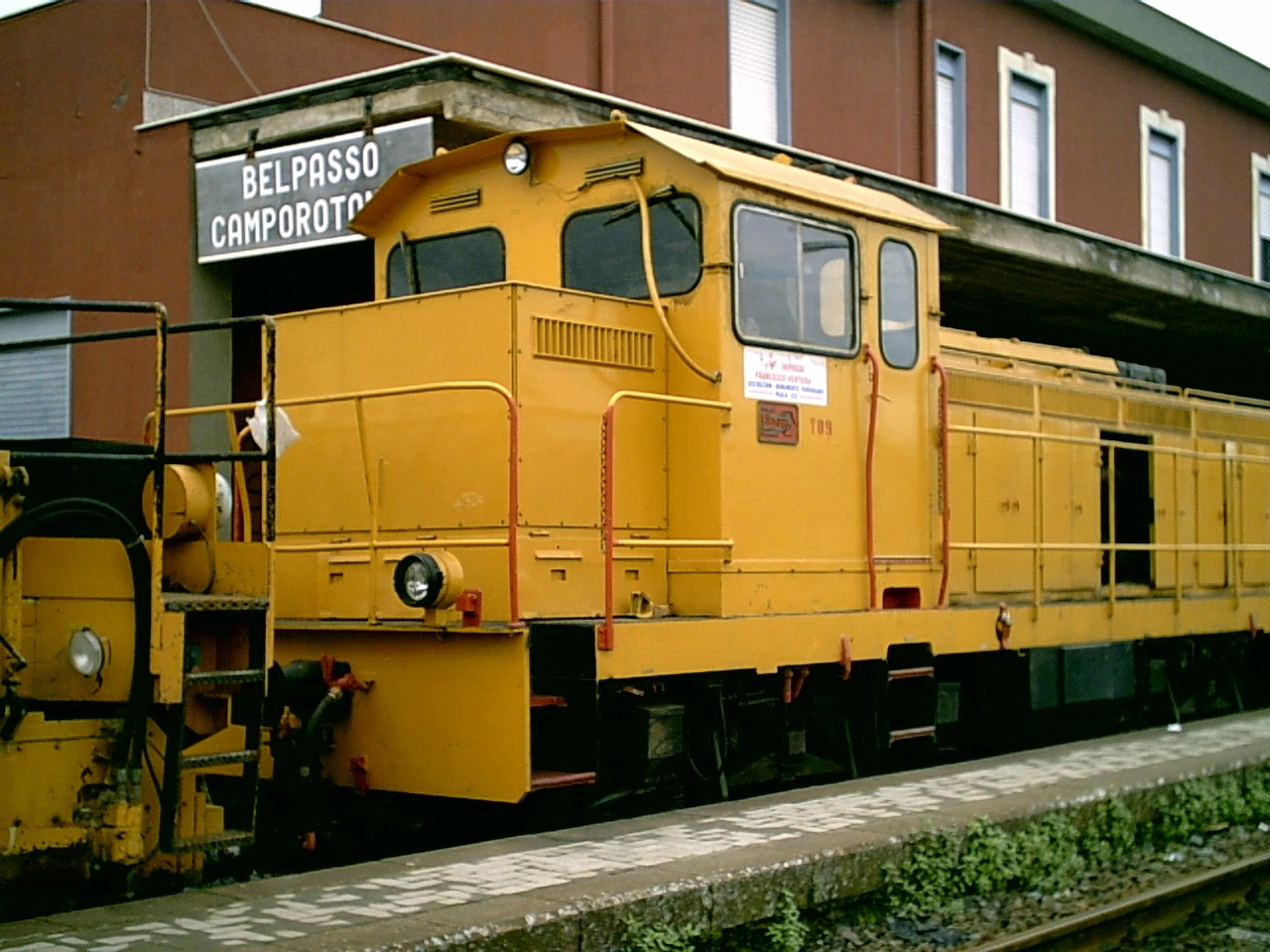
RD 142 locomotive, sold to the railway construction company Ventura

With the closure of the Ribera-Porto Empedocle route and the service provided by replacement buses, the timetable changes were worse for the users and the connections with the replacement buses were often not well studied, with the replacement bus in some cases leaving an hour after the arrival of the train.

== Bibliography ==
- Molino, Nico (1985). La rete FS a scartamento ridotto della Sicilia. Torino: Edizioni elledi. ISBN 88-7649-037-X.
