= SBB Historic =

Coordinates: 47.4754°N 8.2059°E

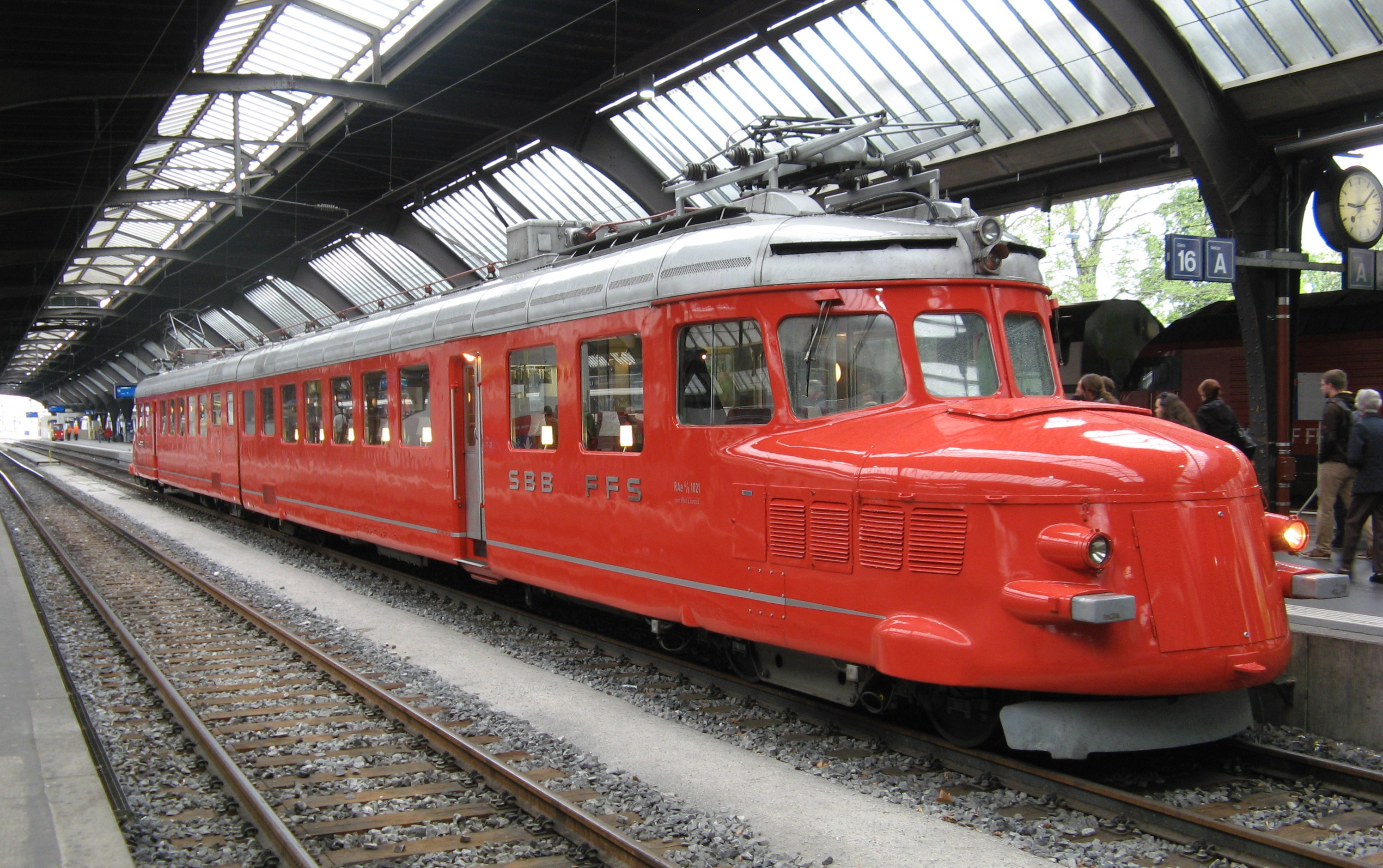
SBB Historic operates historic trains, such as the 1930s Red Arrow

SBB Historic is a foundation aiming at preserving historical documents and artefacts from the history of Swiss railway transportation. It was founded by the Swiss Federal Railways (SBB) in 2001 and it is based in Windisch.

The Foundation's services essentially include:

- A library containing over 30,000 mediums/documents and 300 journals on the subject of railways
- Visits to the archives
- Various events and exhibitions (for instance at the Gotthard Base Tunnel inauguration in 2016)
- Trips on historic rolling stock

== History ==
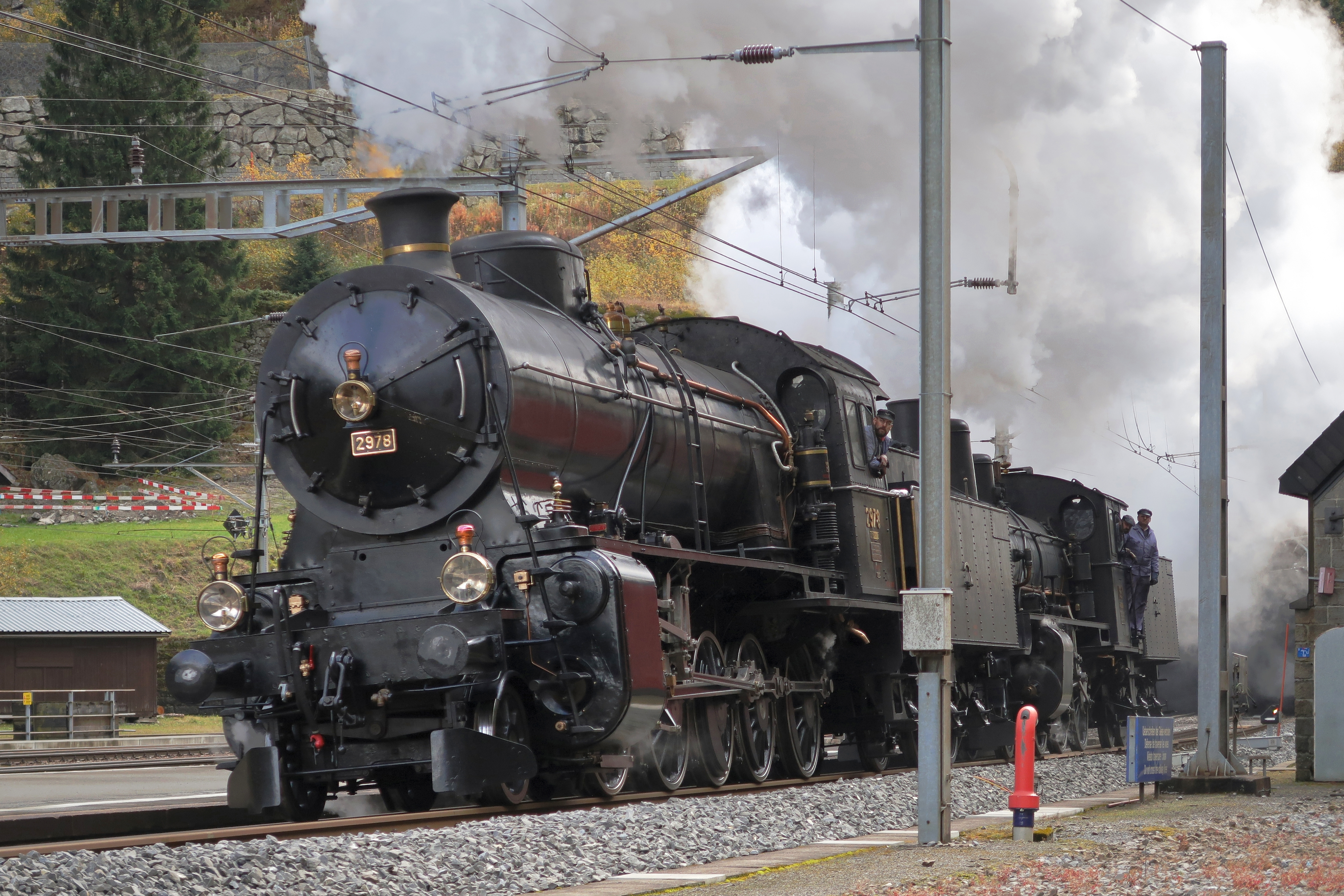
A SBB C5/6 operated on the Gotthard Railway (summit line)

Shortly after it was founded in 1902, the Swiss Federal Railways planned to build a railway museum in order to make the existing historically valuable vehicles and other railway artefacts accessible to the public. After lengthy discussions, a small railway museum was opened in 1918 in the service building of the Zurich freight yard on Hohlstrasse. As the interest for a national transport museum became apparent in the 1950s, the SBB participated in the foundation of the Swiss Museum of Transport, which was finally inaugurated in Lucerne in 1959.

The maintenance of the functionality of the vehicles was mainly the responsibility of the main railway workshops and locomotive depots of the SBB. There the locomotives and wagons were maintained by the workshop staff and the train drivers, in some cases through voluntary work.

The transformation of the Swiss Federal Railways into a stock corporation in 1999 initiated a far-reaching restructuring process. In the course of concentrating on core competencies and cost optimization, SBB established the private law foundation "Historisches Erbe der SBB", commonly referred as to "SBB Historic" in English, in 2001.

In 2015, SBB Historic moved from Bern into the building of the former SBB material warehouse on the south side of Brugg train station.

== See also ==
- List of stock used by Swiss Federal Railways (includes historic rolling stock)
- List of heritage railways and funiculars in Switzerland
