= Red Arrow (Swiss train) =

Swiss railcar type

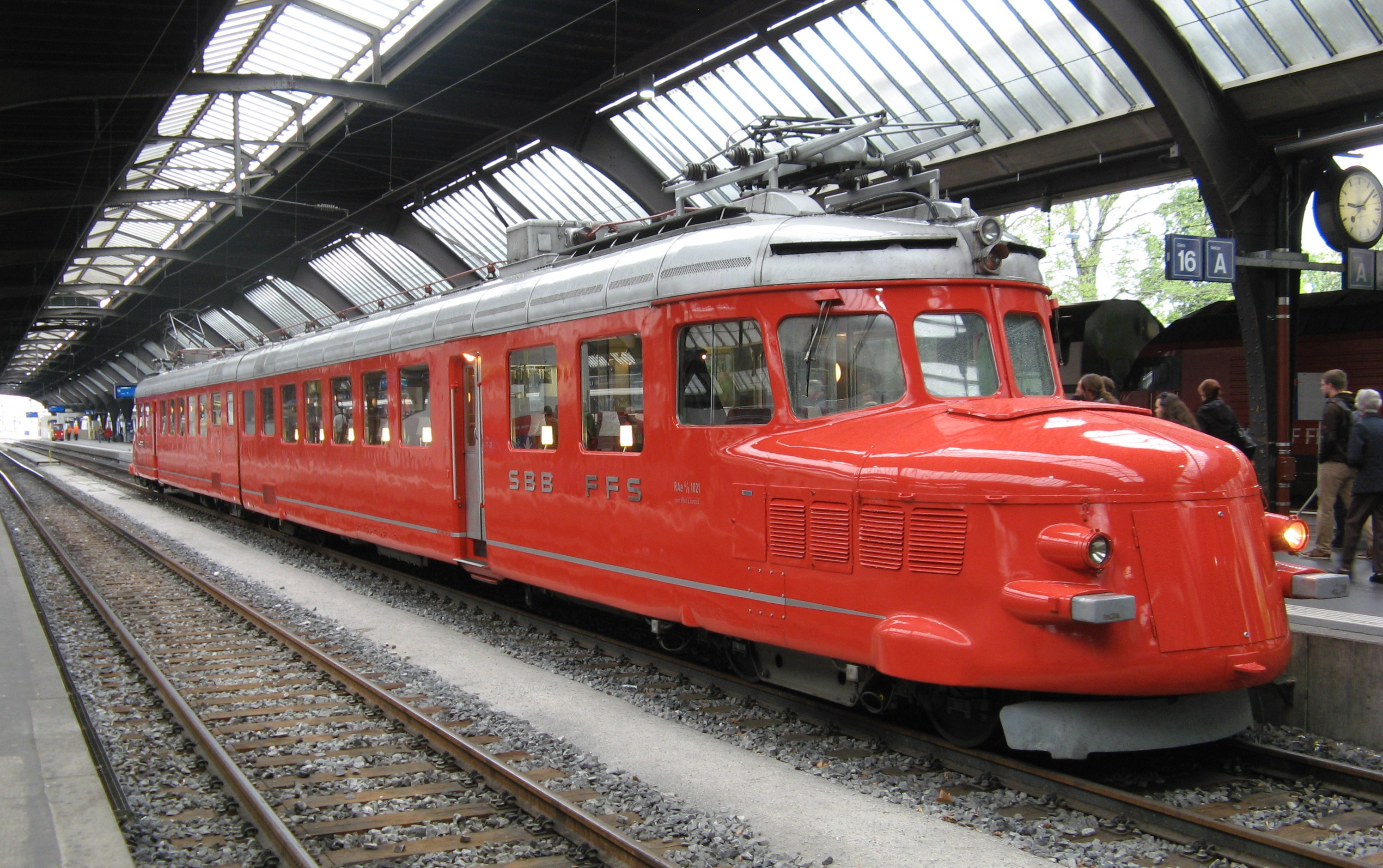
Churchill Pfeil at Zürich Hbf in 2014

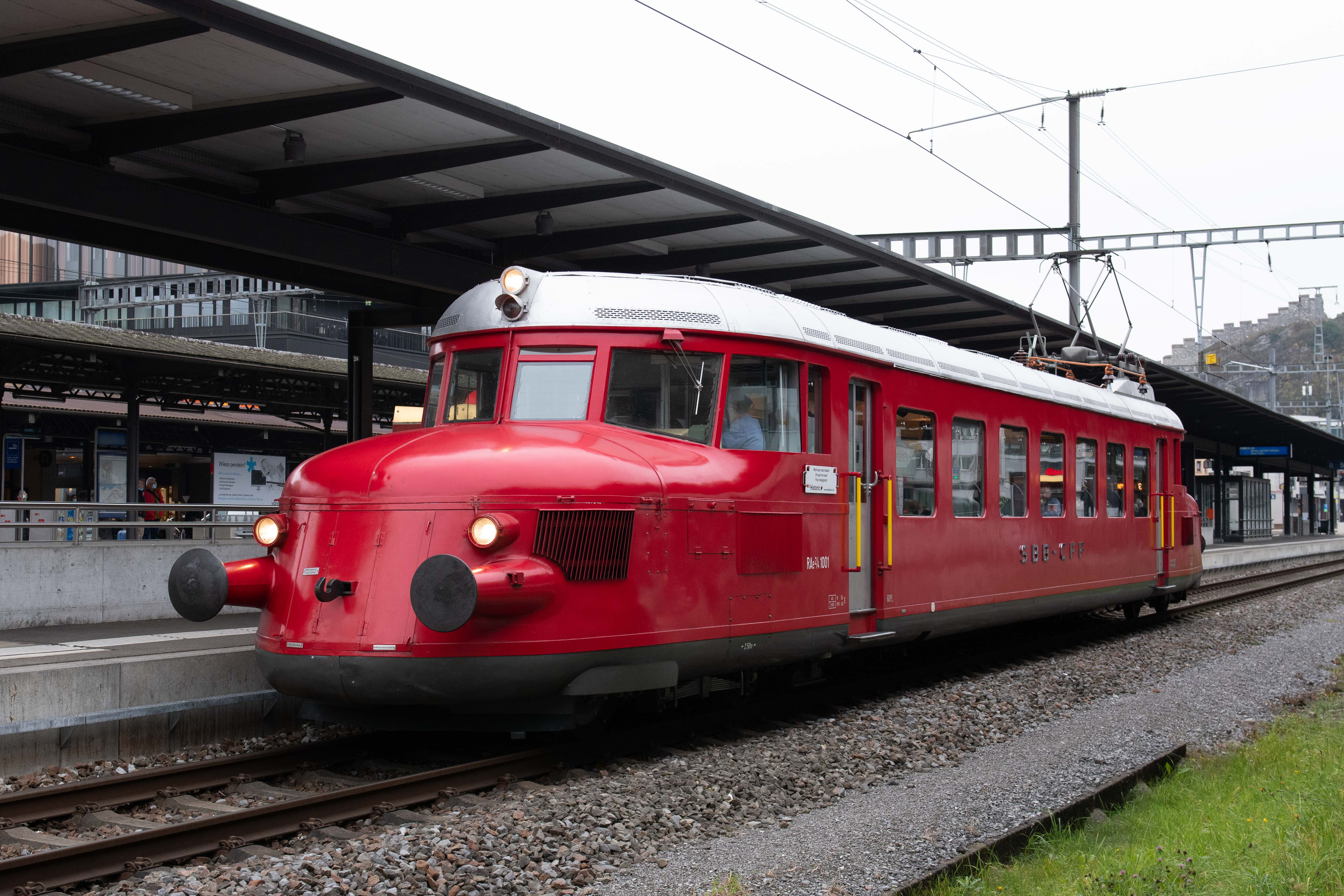
Red Arrow 1001 at Baden in 2021

The Red Arrow (German: Roter Pfeil, French: Flèche rouge, Italian: Freccia rossa) is a class of 12 disparate but similar railcars built in the 1930s by the Swiss Federal Railways (SBB). As built there was a mixture of single and double units, and of diesel and electrically propelled units. They were originally intended for traffic on lines with a low volume of traffic, following the global economic crisis of 1928.

In their original role, the Red Arrows were the victim of their own success, being unable to cope with the increased loadings they brought. Replaced by locomotive hauled trains on their original routes, the SBB capitalised on their popularity by using them on charter and other special services. Later Red Arrows were built specifically for this service.

The most notable Red Arrow is the Churchill Pfeil, a double unit once used by Winston Churchill and still operated on charter services by SBB Historic. Three of the single unit railcars also still exist, with one on display in the Swiss Museum of Transport at Lucerne, one operated by SBB Historic and one operated by the Oensingen-Balsthal Railway.

== Class members ==
Original number	Final number	Year	Notes
RCm 2/4 101	RBe 2/4 1008	1935	Single unit diesel railcar, rebuilt to electric propulsion in 1951–3. Scrapped in 1964.
RCm 2/4 102	RBe 2/4 1009	1935	Single unit diesel railcar, rebuilt to electric propulsion in 1951–3. Scrapped in 1964.
CLe 2/4 201	RAe 2/4 1001	1935	Single unit electric railcar. After being seriously damaged in a fatal collision in 1952, the car was lengthened by 2.6 metres (8 ft 6 in) and upgraded to first class seating for use on charter trains. Still in service with SBB Historic.
CLe 2/4 202	RBe 2/4 1006	1935	Single unit electric railcar. Scrapped in 1967.
CLe 2/4 203	RBe 2/4 1003	1936	Single unit electric railcar. Taken out of service in 1968. Preserved in non-operational condition at the Swiss Museum of Transport in Lucerne.
CLe 2/4 204	RBe 2/4 1004	1936	Single unit electric railcar. Scrapped in 1968.
CLe 2/4 205	RBe 2/4 1005	1936	Single unit electric railcar. Scrapped in 1966.
CLe 2/4 206	RAe 2/4 1002	1936	Single unit electric railcar. Lengthened by 2.6 metres (8 ft 6 in) and upgraded to first class seating for use on charter trains in 1953. Scrapped in 1984.
CLe 2/4 207	RBe 2/4 1007	1938	Single unit electric railcar. Still in service with the Oensingen-Balsthal Railway.
RAe 4/8 301	RAe 4/8 1021	1939	Double unit electric railcar, built with first class seating for charter service and displayed at the Swiss National Exhibition of 1939. Now known as Churchill Pfeil and still in service with SBB Historic.
RAe 4/8 661	RAe 4/8 1022	1953	Double unit electric railcar, built with first class seating for charter service but without the distinctive front end of the other Red Arrows. Scrapped in 1977.
RAe 4/8 662	RAe 4/8 1023	1953	Double unit electric railcar, built with first class seating for charter service but without the distinctive front end of the other Red Arrows. Scrapped in 1985.

== Churchill Pfeil ==
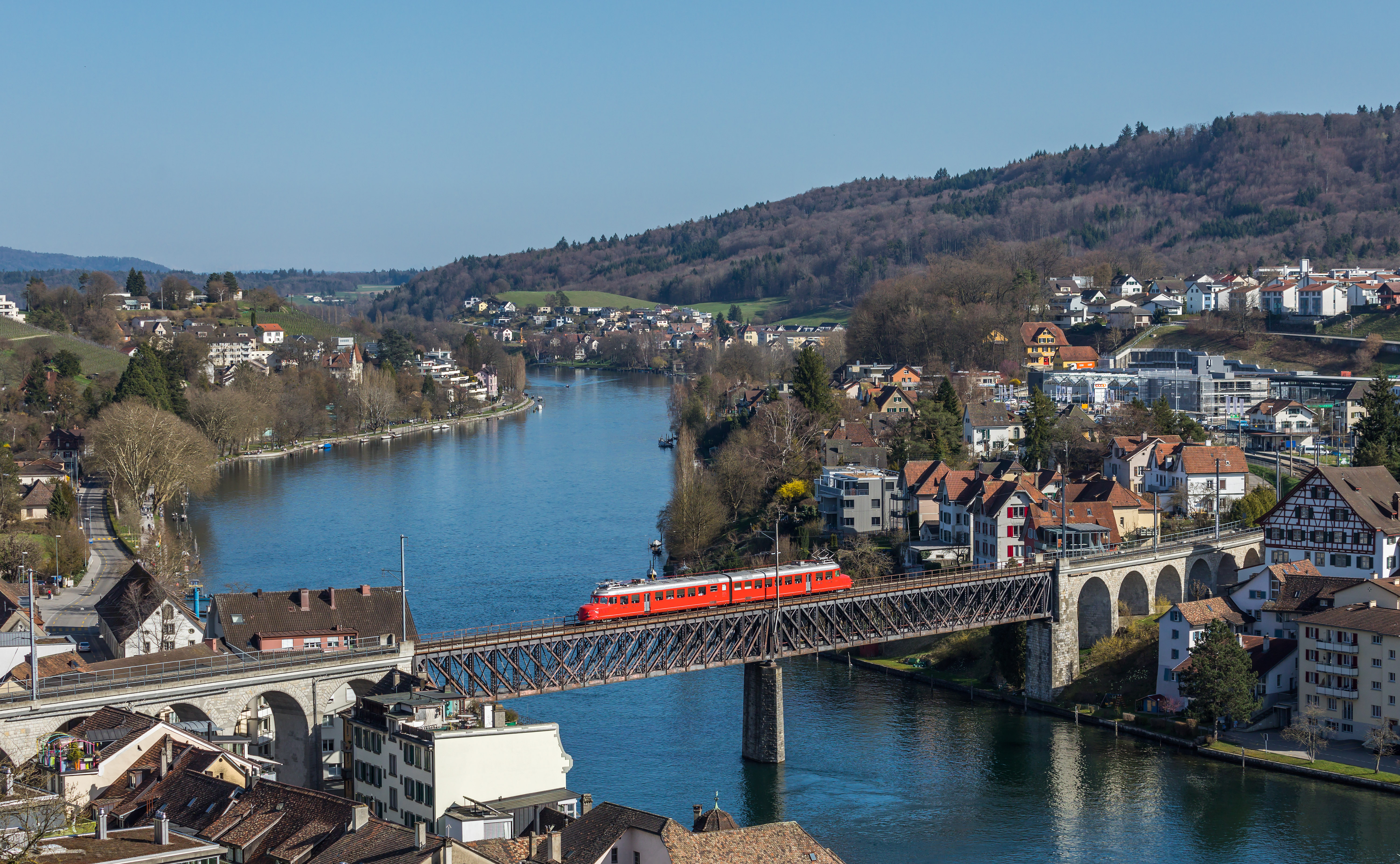
The SBB RAe 4/8 Red Arrow crossing the Feuerthalen Rhine bridge in April 2018

Whilst based on the design of the earlier single car Red Arrows, the double Red Arrow Re 4/8 301 was built exclusively for use on charter trains, and is capable of speeds up to 150 kilometres per hour (93 mph). It was presented at the Swiss National Exhibition of 1939 to showcase Swiss workmanship.

In 1946, Winston Churchill made a visit to Switzerland, and 301 was provided for his use in visiting various Swiss cities including Bern and Zürich. It was on this visit, at the University of Zürich, that he made his famous speech advocating the creation of a United States of Europe. As a result of this visit, 301 became known as the Churchill Pfeil, or Churchill Arrow.

In 1979, the Churchill Pfeil was badly damaged in a fire, after which it was sold. In 1996 the train was repaired and put into service by the Mittelthurgau Railway. In 2002, and after the Mittelthurgau Railway had gone into bankruptcy, the train returned to the SBB. In 2004, the unit was completely overhauled and put back into service as a charter vehicle.

== See also ==
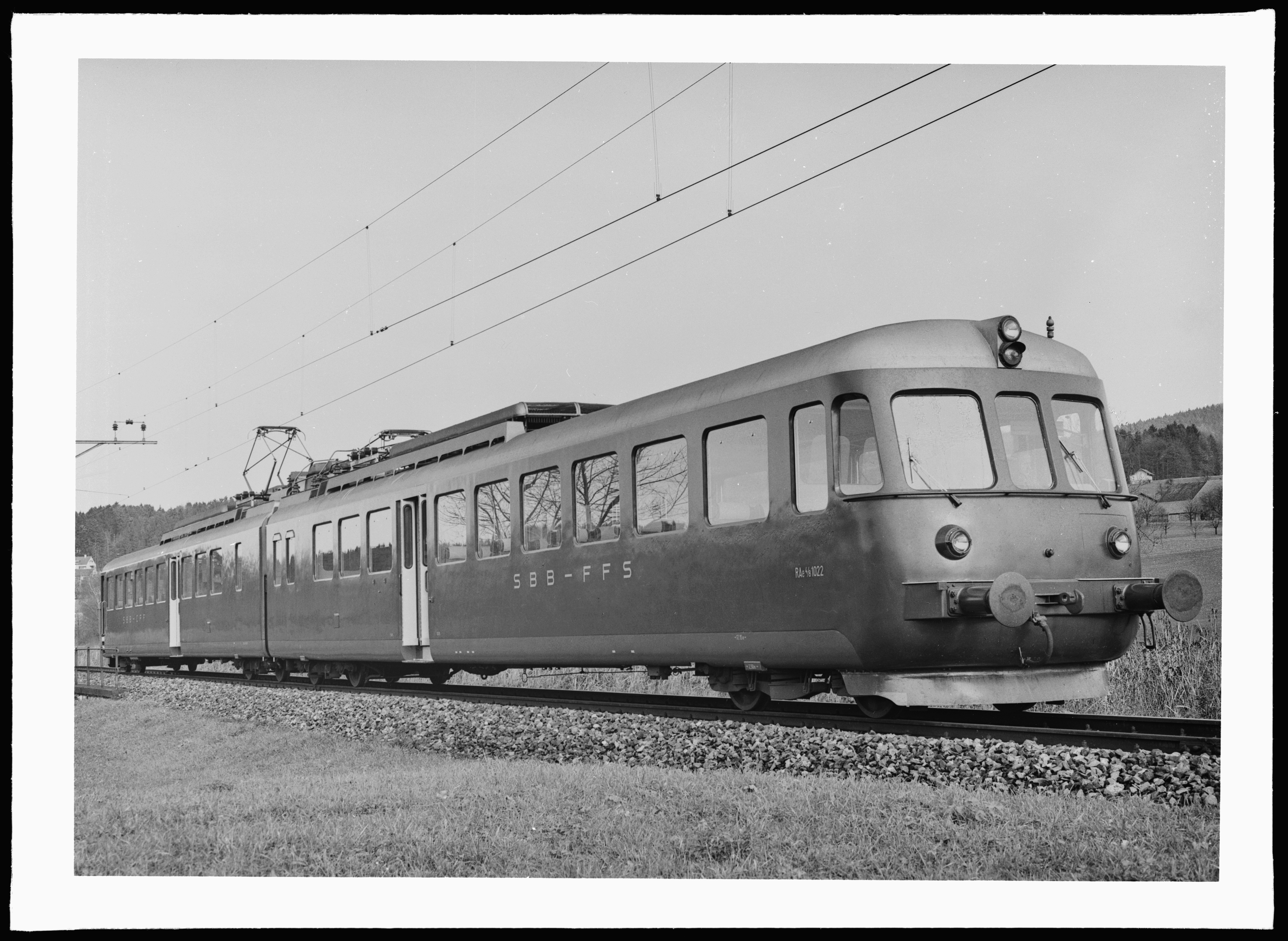
Red Arrow 1022, sometime after 1963

- List of heritage railways and funiculars in Switzerland
