= Alcantara–Randazzo railway =

Railway line in Sicily, Italy

Overview
- Native name: Ferrovia Alcantara–Randazzo
- Locale: Sicily, Italy
- Termini: Alcantara; Randazzo

Technical
- Track gauge: 1,435 mm (4 ft 8 1/2 in)
- Electrification: N/A
- Operating speed: 75 mph (121 km/h)

The Alcantara–Randazzo railway (Italian: Ferrovia Alcantara-Randazzo) is a railway line in Sicily, Italy, with standard gauge, built to connect Randazzo and the upper Alcantara Valley with the Messina-Syracuse Ionian coastal line. Circulation was suspended in 1994, the line was closed in 2002, and finally decommissioned in 2011 with Ministerial Decree no. 389. In August 2017, with law No. 128, it was included in the first list of railways to be classified as tourist railways to protect the integrity of the route, to prevent its sale and any use other than railway.

In 2022, the first works to restore it for tourism purposes began, initially up to the Motta Camastra station.

== History ==
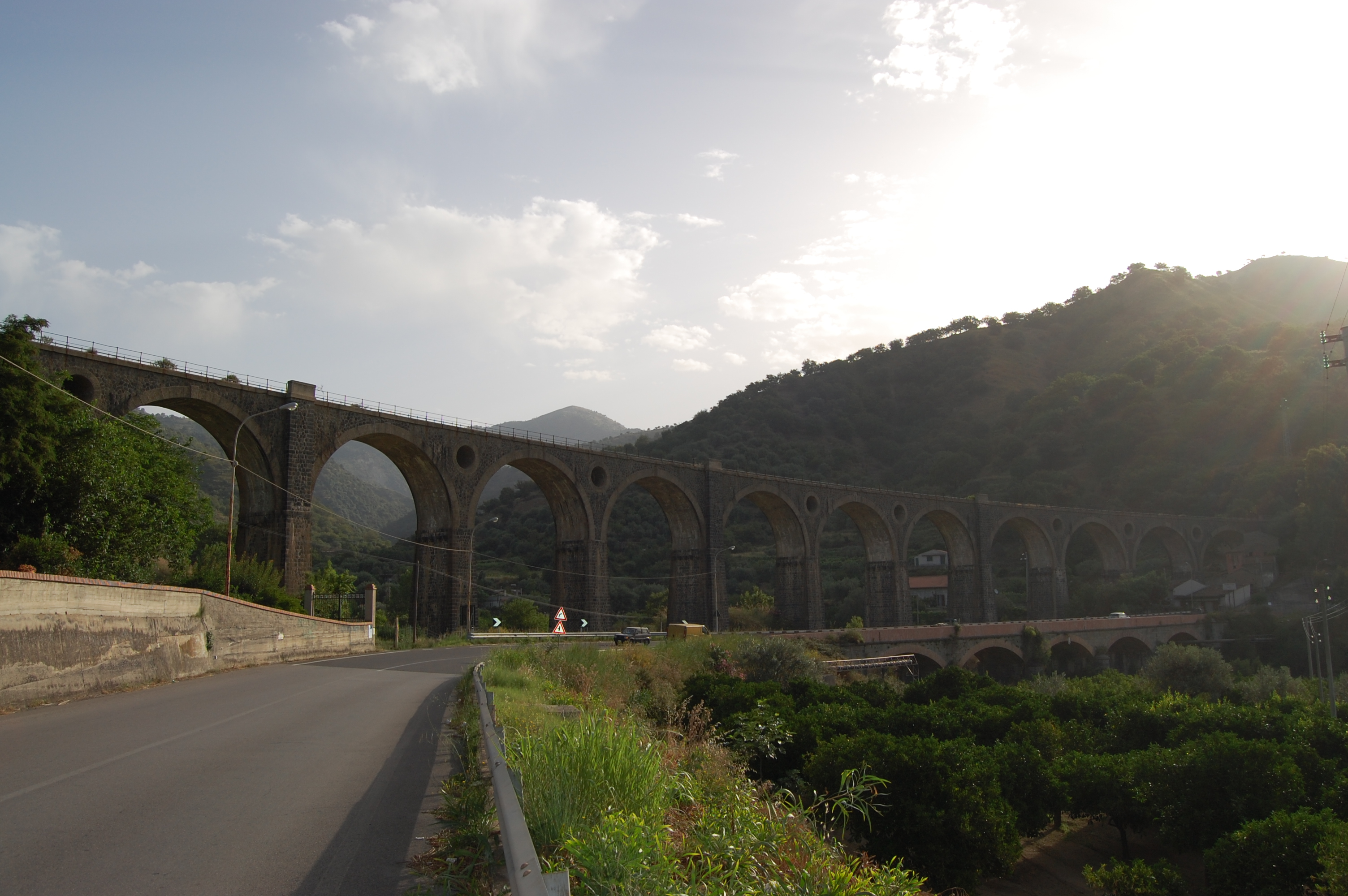
Ponte San Cataldo arched railway viaduct, near the district of the same name in Motta Camastra.

In March 2022, through a 15 million euro financing from the PNRR, preparatory works were started for the partial recovery for tourist use up to the Francavilla di Sicilia station, which moved on to a second phase of actual restoration in November 2022.
