= Tubize (disambiguation) =

Tubize may refer to:

- A.F.C. Tubize, a Belgian football club
- Tubize, a Belgian municipality
- Ateliers de Tubize, see List_of_locomotive_builders#Belgium
- Tubize 2069, a preserved steam locomotive
- Tubize 2179, a preserved narrow-gauge steam locomotive
