= Dendermonde–Puurs Steam Railway =

Heritage railway in Belgium

Coordinates: 51.062°N 4.2245°E

The Dendermonde–Puurs Steam Railway (Stoomtrein Dendermonde-Puurs) is a heritage railway situated in the Belgian provinces of East Flanders (Oost-Vlaanderen) and Antwerp (Antwerpen).

It runs from the town of Dendermonde to the town of Puurs over about 14 kilometres (8.7 mi) of 1,435 mm (4 ft 8 1/2 in) (standard gauge) track. The railway is maintained by SDP, a non-profit historical railway society. SDP, which stands for Stoomtrein Dendermonde Puurs, or Steam train Dendermonde Puurs , has a depot at the railway station in Baasrode-Noord. The trains are pulled by both steam and diesel locomotives.

The railway has been used occasionally by various film and television production companies to shoot movie scenes that are too elaborate to be filmed on the Belgian national railway network because of the potential disruption to traffic. The best known example of a movie that includes several scenes shot on the railway is Toto le Héros.

== Motive Power ==
=== Steam locomotives ===
Number	Builder	Year of construction	Speed	Weight	Remark	Picture
1 Cockerill	Cockerill	1907	30 km/h (19 mph)	17.7 t (19.5 short tons)	Was built in 1907 by Cockerill with the factory number 2643. Delivered at the Meuneries et Brasseries of Marchienne-Au-Pont and ran till 1971 at ABR in Petit-Enghien. In 1981 began the restoration after which the locomotive went to the Dendermonde–Puurs Steam Railway in 1986. Between 1991 and 1998 number 1 was out of service, after which she was restored. The locomotive has been waiting for an overhaul since 2017.	
2 Duvel	Henschel	1946	40 km/h (25 mph)	65.9 t (72.6 short tons)	Was built in 1946 for the Hersfelder Kreisbahn by Henschel with the factory number 29884. 1953: Hüttenwerke Ilsede Peine. 1960: Castrop-Rauxel. 1970: Eschweiler Bergwerksverein in Alsdorf under the name Anna 2. In 1990 to SDP. Under restoration till 1993 and began its new service life on the railway in 1993/1994. In 1997 after a problem with the firebox was discovered, she was taken out of service.	
3 Wase Kleiputter	FUF HSP	1922	30 km/h (19 mph)	19 t (21 short tons)	Was built in 1922 by FUF HSP with the factory number 1378. Delivered at Scheerders-Kerchove in Sint-Niklaas. By the late 1960s she went out of service because of leaks in the boiler. In the mid-1980s she arrived in Baasrode. In 2007 her restoration began. The tenders and the cab were adjusted so she could run the entire line. After 3 years the locomotive was in service.	
4 Helena	Tubize	1927	50 km/h (31 mph)	40 t (44 short tons)	Build by the Société Anonyme Les Ateliers Métallurgiques de Tubize in 1927 at Tubize with the factory number 2069. Ran for Métallurgie Hoboken till the 1970s. In the 1980s she was donated to SDP. Was restored in 2007. Out of service since 2014, she was back on the rails since 2020.	
5 Jojo	Cockerill	1875		13.8 t (15.2 short tons)	Build by Cockerill in 1875 with the factory number 975 for the coalmines of Glain near Liège. In 1970 the locomotive went out of service. Afterwards she went to Kinkepois and Toeristische Trein Zolder. A fellow cockerill loco went to Raeren station, three others were scrapped. In 1990 TTZ moved to As station, where they became known as the Limburgse Stoomvereniging, later Kolenspoor. In 2008 Jojo went to Baasrode. Since 2020 she is under restoration.	
6 Alice	FUF HSP	1899			Build by FUF HSP in 1899.	
7 Taty	FUF HSP	1906			Build by FUF HSP in 1906.	
8 2334	Tubize	1948	50 km/h (31 mph)	40 t (44 short tons)	Build by Les Ateliers Métallurgiques de Tubize in 1948 with the factory number 2334. Shares a heavy resemble with number 4 'Helena'. Was active at Charbonnage du Levant in Tertre under the number 16 till the 1970s. The loco was put in the shed and rediscovered in 2000. Initially she went to Stoomcentrum Maldegem. Later she arrived in Baasrode, where the locomotive is waiting for a possible restoration.	
9 Petit Château	Cockerill	1859			Build by Cockerill in 1859 with the factory number 509. She was initially built for the Compagnie du Nord – Belge under the number 965, but was later renumbered to 615. In 1934 the loco was sold to Charbonnage de Monceau Fontaine and was taken out of service there in 1965. She ended up in the hands of the NMBS and was given to SDP in 2013.	
10 3083	Cockerill	1924			Type IVR with vertical boiler. The loco was built for Usine Gustave Boël, located in La Louvière, and later ended up working at Focquet in Vilvoorde. After going out of service she was preserved at a heritage railway in England. They never restored 3083 and in 2019 Tubize 2069 vzw bought the loco and brought her to Baasrode.	
11 2333	Tubize	1948			2333 is the almost identical to loco 4 Helena, except she's 80 cm shorter and has two axles. The loco was built for the Forges de Clabecq. She only ran there for a short time and ended up in a shed. When the site was demolished CFV3V preserved the loco. In 2021 2333 was bought by Tubize 2069 vzw and in 2022 she was transported from Treignes to Willebroek.	

=== Diesel locomotives ===
Number	Class	Year of construction	Speed	Weight	Remark	Picture
5922	HLD 59	1955			Build by Cockerill.	
6219	HLD 62	1961			Build by La Brugeoise et Nivelles	
8463	HLR 84	1954			Build by Baume & Marpent.	
8467	HLR 84	1954			Build by Baume & Marpent.	
8509 Chicago	HLR 85	1954	50 km/h (31 mph)	57.3 t (63.2 short tons)	Build by Baume & Marpent.	
9105	HLR 91	1978			Build by Cockerill.	
8228 Domino	Reeks 82	1965	60 km/h (37 mph)	57 t (63 short tons)	Build by Ateliers Belges Réunies in 1965.	

=== Railcars ===
Number	Class	Year of construction	Speed	Weight	Remark	Picture
4302	MW43		90 km/h (56 mph)	52.7 t (58.1 short tons)	Was in service from 1954 to the end of December 1986.	
4602	MW46				Now in the hands of TSP	
4614	MW46		80 km/h (50 mph)		Was put into service in 1952 with the number 55414. After her career with the NMBS she was used by the Toeristische Trein Zolder. Afterwards she was put up as a monument at Maredsous station. Since 2016 the railcar is the property of SDP.	

== See also ==
- Tubize 2069
- Heritage railway
- List of heritage railways
