= Tubize 2179 =

No.2179 / Cukrownia Chełmica No.1
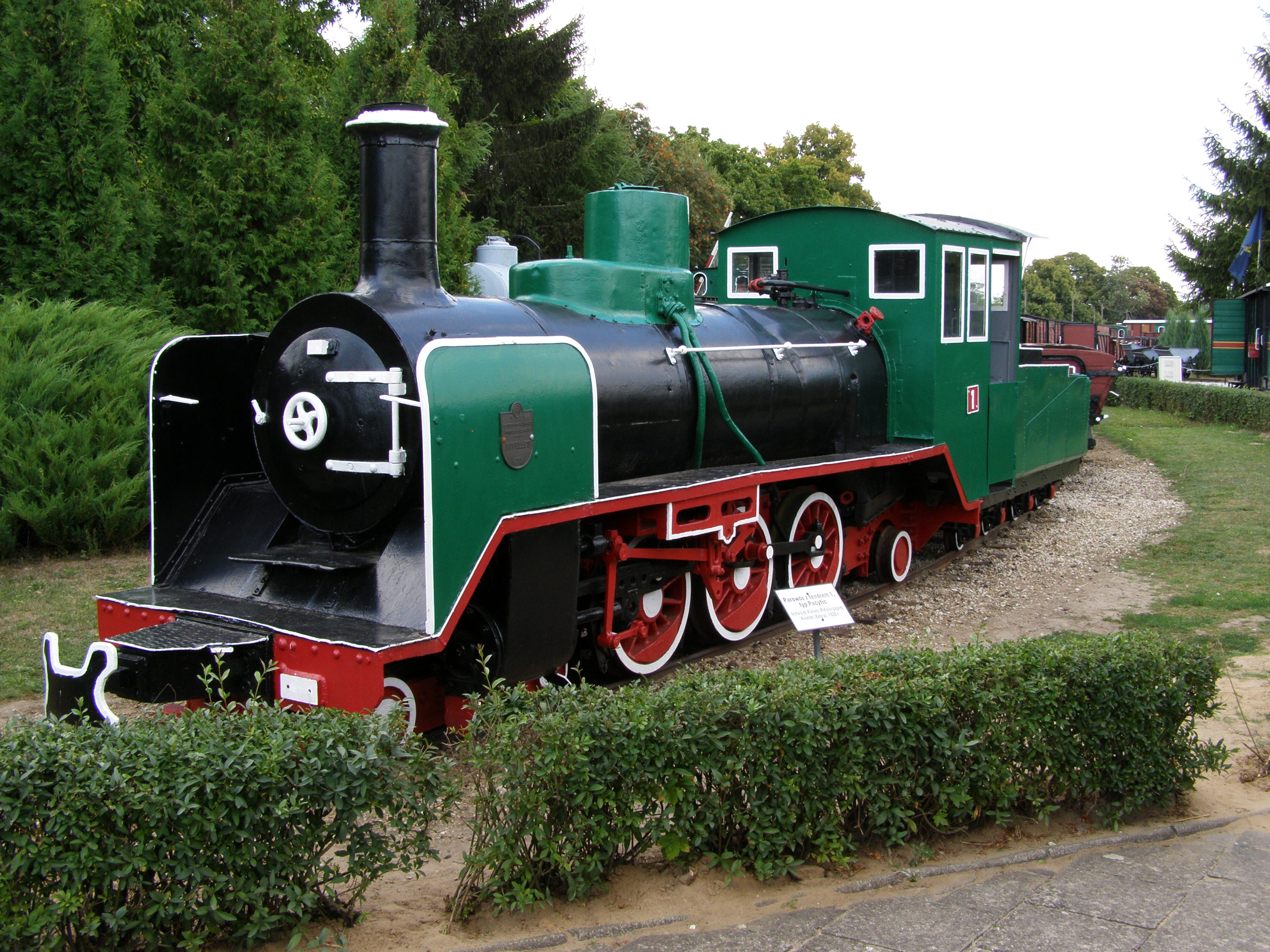
Type and origin
- Power type: steam
- Builder: Ateliers Métallurgiques de Tubize
- Serial number: 2179
- Build date: 1935
Specifications
- Configuration
  - Whyte: 4-6-2
  - UIC: 2C1 (2C1n2)
- Gauge: 600 mm (1 ft 11 5/8 in)
- Driver dia.: 660 mm (26 in)
- Trailing dia.: 310 mm (12 in)
- Tender wheels: 320 mm (13 in)
- Wheelbase
  - Engine: 4,490 mm (14 ft 9 in)
  - Coupled: 1,600 mm (5 ft 3 in)
  - Tender: 2,710 mm (8 ft 11 in)
  - Tender bogie: 850 mm (2 ft 9 in)
- Length: 6,555 mm (21 ft 6.1 in) (10,715 mm or 35 ft 1.9 in with tender)
- Width: 1,450 mm (4 ft 9 in)
- Height: 2,350 mm (7 ft 9 in)
- Tender type: 2-bogie, 4-axle
- Fuel type: coal
- Tender cap.: 1,800 kg (4,000 lb) coal 3.2 m^{3} (700 imp gal) water
- Boiler pressure: 14 kg/cm^{2}
- Cylinders: 2
- Cylinder size: 250 mm (9.8 in) bore × 300 mm (12 in) stroke
- Valve gear: Walschaerts
- Loco brake: Air, later steam
Performance figures
- Maximum speed: 30 km/h (19 mph)
Career
- Operators: Colonial Exhibition in Brussels sugar factory (Cukrownia) Ostrowy sugar factory (Cukrownia) Chełmica
- Official name: Charles (1935-1940)
- Nicknames: Belgijka
- Current owner: Narrow Gauge Railway Museum in Wenecja
- Disposition: static display

Tubize 2179 is a preserved Belgian 600 mm (1 ft 11 5/8 in) narrow gauge steam locomotive built by Ateliers de Tubize as one of six of its class, and used for most of its life in Poland. The wheel notation is 4-6-2 (2C1). It is currently also known as Pacific or Cukrownia Chełmica No.1.

== History ==
The locomotive was one of a series of six locomotives built in 1935 by Ateliers Métallurgiques in Nivelles and Tubize, specially for a purpose of a transport during a Colonial Exhibition in Brussels. They were miniatures of standard gauge express locomotives, hence they used not typical for a narrow gauge wheel 4-6-2s. They also had other features, like long, low boilers, Wagner-type smoke deflectors, low chimney, low steam collector in a common long housing with a sandbox, and miniature driver booth, not giving shelter. The locomotives were completed at Tubize, which also manufactured boilers. The locomotive with a boiler number 2179 was named Charles and had number 3 in exhibition's stock.

During World War II, the locomotives were seized by the Germans and utilized by them for military or construction railways. The locomotive 2179 was found in 1945 in Stettin (now Szczecin, Poland) and seized by the Polish authorities. It was used for debris removing during the city reconstruction. Then it was sold to sugar factory Ostrowy near Kutno, where it was assigned number 1 and used to haul sugar beet trains. After the factory had converted its lines to 750 mm (2 ft 5 1/2 in) gauge in 1952, the locomotive was given to sugar factory Chełmica near Włocławek (Cukrownia Chełmica), with a stock number 1 (hence it was known as Cukrownia Chełmica No.1). The locomotive, with its distinctive look, was nicknamed Belgijka there (Belgian female).

In 1958 the locomotive was overhauled in Nowy Sącz railway workshops and reconstructed. The driver's booth was much enlarged and became functional, spoiling its proportions however. The chimney and the sandbox were made taller. In 1969, Chełmica sugar works removed its sugar beet railway, and the locomotive was left at Lipno station for several years. In 1972 it was acquired by the Warsaw Railway Museum and by the end of the 1970s it was given to Narrow Gauge Railway Museum in Wenecja, as a cold exhibit.

== Tubize 2177 ==
Sister locomotive Tubize 2177 ADOLPHE is the only other suvivor of the 6 locomotives built for the Colonia Exhibition. It survives in an unrestored state at Maldegem in Belgium.
