= List of protected heritage sites in Tubize =

This table shows an overview of the protected heritage sites in the Walloon town Tubeke, or Tubize. This list is part of Belgium's national heritage.

Object	Year/architect	Town/section	Address	Coordinates	Number^{?}	Image
Church (Saint-Martin) in Oisquercq ^{(nl)} ^{(fr)}		Tubeke		50.670200°N 4.219673°E	25105-CLT-0005-01 Info	Kerk ('Saint-Martin') te Oisquercq
Tower of Church of St Renelde in Saintes ^{(nl)} ^{(fr)}		Tubeke		50.704138°N 4.160380°E	25105-CLT-0007-01 Info	Toren van kerk Sainte Renelde, te Saintes
The car of the procession of St. Renelde located in the church of Sainte Renelde in Saintes ^{(nl)} ^{(fr)}		Tubeke		50.704161°N 4.160456°E	25105-CLT-0008-01 Info	De wagen van de processie van St. Renelde gelegen in de kerk van Sainte Renelde, te Saintes
Windmill stone, called "Hondzocht mill" in Saintes ^{(nl)} ^{(fr)}		Tubeke		50.714176°N 4.177497°E	25105-CLT-0009-01 Info	Windmolen steen, genaamd "Hondzochtmolen" te Saintes
Plane tree "Arbre de la Liberté" planted by volunteers on their return from Brussels in 1830, growing on the public square of Saintes ^{(nl)} ^{(fr)}		Tubeke		50.704341°N 4.159952°E	25105-CLT-0010-01 Info	Plataan "Arbre de la Liberté" geplant door vrijwilligers bij hun terugkeer uit Brussel in 1830, groeiend op het openbare plein van Saintes
The facades and roofs of the castle and the farm Clabecq and the ensemble formed by these buildings and their surrounding grounds ^{(nl)} ^{(fr)}		Tubeke		50.684370°N 4.224390°E	25105-CLT-0012-01 Info	De gevels en daken van het kasteel en de boerderij Clabecq en het ensemble gevormd door deze gebouwen en hun omliggende gronden
Wells Sainte-Renelde to Saintes, and the ensemble of the wells and the surrounding grounds ^{(nl)} ^{(fr)}		Tubeke		50.697678°N 4.155592°E	25105-CLT-0013-01 Info	Putten Sainte-Renelde, te Saintes, en het ensemble van de putten en de omliggende gronden

== See also ==
- Lists of protected heritage sites in Walloon Brabant
- Tubize
