= Belgian Railways Class 15 =

Class 15
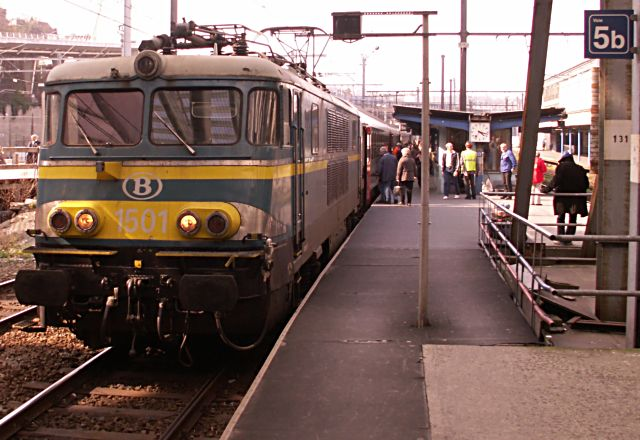
- NMBS/SNCB Class 15 loco 1501 in Liège-Guillemins station with an IR service.
Type and origin
- Power type: Electric
- Builder: BN/ACEC
- Build date: 1962
- Total produced: 5
Specifications
- Configuration
  - AAR: Bo-Bo
- Gauge: 1,435 mm (4 ft 8 1/2 in) standard gauge
- Driver dia.: 1,250 mm (49.21 in)
- Length: 17.75 m (58 ft 3 in)
- Height: 4.265 m (13 ft 11.9 in)
- Adhesive weight: 9.7 t
- Loco weight: 77.7 t (76.47 long tons; 85.65 short tons)
- Electric system/s: 1,500 V DC; 3,000 V DC; 25,000 V AC
- Current pickup(s): Pantograph
Performance figures
- Maximum speed: 160 km/h (99 mph)
- Power output: 2,780 kW (3,728 bhp)
- Tractive effort: 170 kN (38,000 lbf)
Career
- Operators: SNCB/NMBS
- Class: 15
- Number in class: 3
- Numbers: 1501, 1503, 1504
- Delivered: 1962
- Retired: May 2009

Class 15 is a type of electric locomotive operated by SNCB/NMBS. The locomotives were originally used for cross-border services TEE services between France, Belgium and the Netherlands, and, like the class 16, they became surplus after the introduction of Thalys and Class 11s. They earned their keep in their last years of service by pulling commuter "P" trains in the Liège area.

== History ==
These five locomotives were constructed in 1962 by La Brugeoise et Nivelles and were the first polycurrent locomotives ordered by SNCB/NMBS. They were designed for use on the 25 kV 50 Hz system in Northern France, the 3 kV DC system used in Belgium and the 1.5 kV DC system in use in the Netherlands.

Prior to the January 1971 renumbering, they were known in the six-number scheme as Type 150, and were numbered 150.001 to 150.005.

In the early 1980s, lacking the power to haul increasingly heavy TEE trains, the Series 15 power units were replaced by the SNCF Class CC 40100 locomotives between Paris and Brussels, but they continued to be used on services between Brussels to Amsterdam until the late 1980s, when they were withdrawn due to lack of compatibility with the new Dutch ATB signaling system. The Series 15 locomotives were then used on international trains between Liège and Paris, while being progressively incorporated into the Belgian domestic service, in particular on the Ostende-Liège line.

The units were stored in December 2000. A lack of suitable locomotives following the electrification of Line 43 between Liege and Luxembourg resulted in the locomotives returning to service to haul "P" (Peak hour) trains.

Final retirement from service was in 2004.

Two units were preserved 1503 (preserved by SNCB/NMBS at Train World Schaerbeek), and 1504 (preserved by PFT).
