= 2069 (disambiguation) =

2069 is a year in the 2060s decade

2069 may also refer to

- The year 2069 BC in the 21st century BC
- 2069 (number), the number
- 2069 (album), 2000 album by 69Boyz
- 2069 Hubble, a main-belt asteroid
- Tubize 2069, a Belgian preserved steam locomotive
- 2069 AD (video game), an X68000 video game
