= Stanisław Bohdan Grabiński =

Polish nobleman (1891–1930)

- Coat of arms: Pomian
- Born: 11 October 1891; Chelmica Duza, Poland
- Died: 11 October 1930 (aged 39); Poznań, Poland
- Noble family: Grabiński
- Spouses: Maria Dzieduszycka; Jadwiga Maria Potocka
- Father: Stanislaw Grabinski
- Mother: Maria Modzelewska

Stanisław Bohdan Grabiński (1891 – 1930) was a Polish nobleman (szlachcic) and landowner.

Stanisław was owner of Walewice estates. He was married to Maria Dzieduszycka in 1918 in Lwów, and to Countess Jadwiga Maria Potocka in 1921 in Kraków. His son Władysław Krzysztof fought and died in the Warsaw Uprising in 1944.

Stanisław also had four other children, including Maria, Stanislaw, Roza and Jan.

Grabiński was awarded the Cross of Valour and the Virtuti Militari for his service during the Soviet-Polish War.
