= Lisek, Kuyavian-Pomeranian Voivodeship =

Lisek
- Village
- Location within Poland
- Coordinates: 52°46′13″N 19°4′6″E
- Country: Poland
- Voivodeship: Kuyavian-Pomeranian
- County: Włocławek
- Gmina: Fabianki
- Population: 250

Lisek [ˈlisɛk] is a village in the administrative district of Gmina Fabianki, within Włocławek County, Kuyavian-Pomeranian Voivodeship, in north-central Poland.
