= Grabinski =

Grabinski or Grabiński is a surname of Polish origin. Notable people with the surname include:

- Christoph Grabinski (born 1990), German footballer
- Cristian Grabinski (born 1980), Argentine footballer
- Henryk Grabiński (1843–1903), Polish painter
- Stanisław Bohdan Grabiński (1891–1930), Polish nobleman
- Stefan Grabiński (1887–1936), Polish writer
- Ted Grabinski (1916–2000), American football player

== See also ==
- Vladimir Grabinsky (born 1974) Ukrainian chess player
