= Szpetal Górny =

- Village
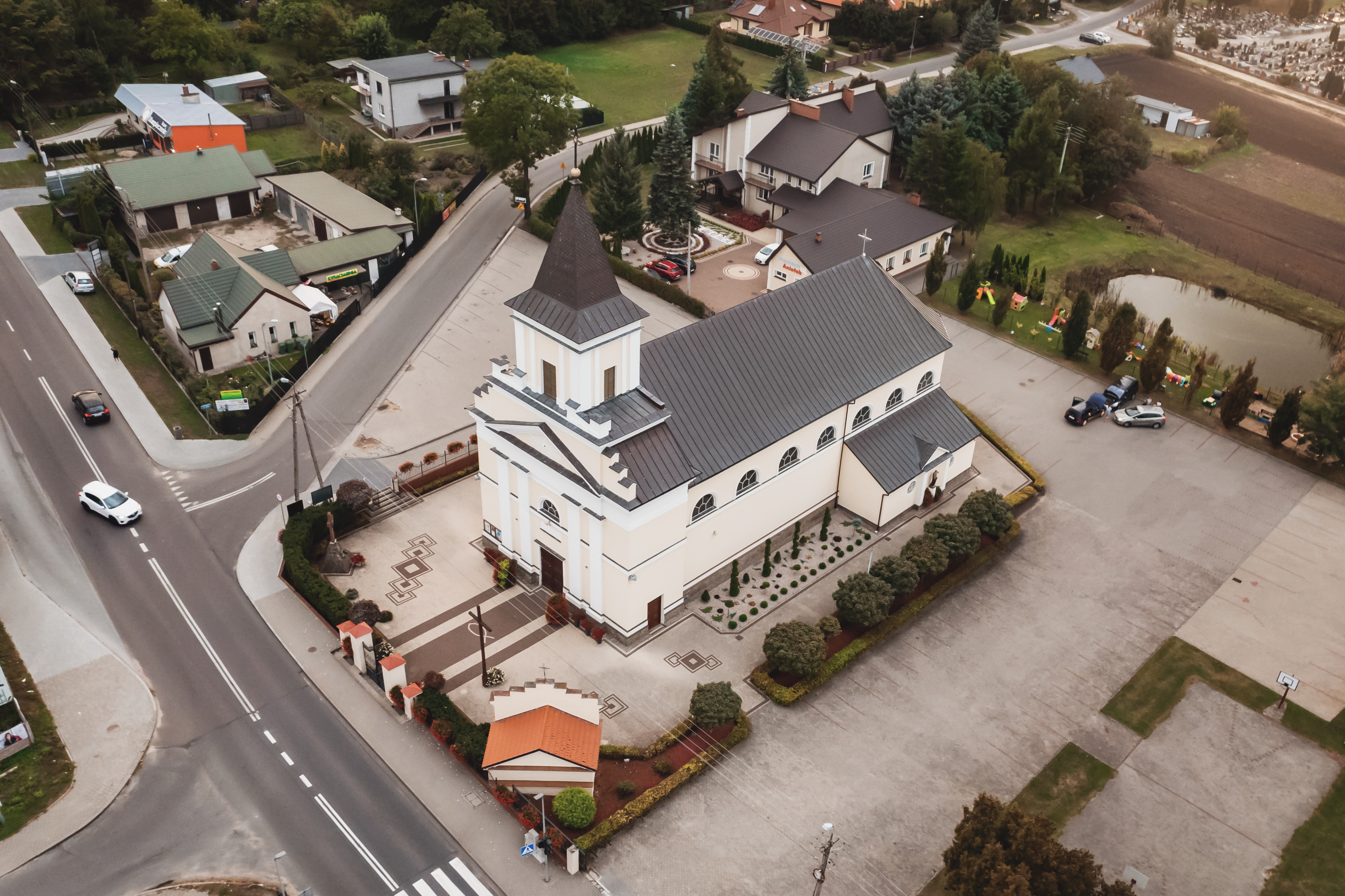
- Saint Joseph church in Szpetal Górny

- Location within Poland
- Coordinates: 52°41′N 19°6′E
- Country: Poland
- Voivodeship: Kuyavian-Pomeranian
- County: Włocławek
- Gmina: Fabianki

Population
  - Total: 1,856
- Time zone: UTC+1 (CET)
  - Summer (DST): UTC+2 (CEST)
- Vehicle registration: CWL

Szpetal Górny [ˈʂpɛtal ˈɡurnɨ] is a small village in the administrative district of Gmina Fabianki, within Włocławek County, Kuyavian-Pomeranian Voivodeship, in central Poland.
