= Krępiny, Kuyavian-Pomeranian Voivodeship =

Krępiny
- Village
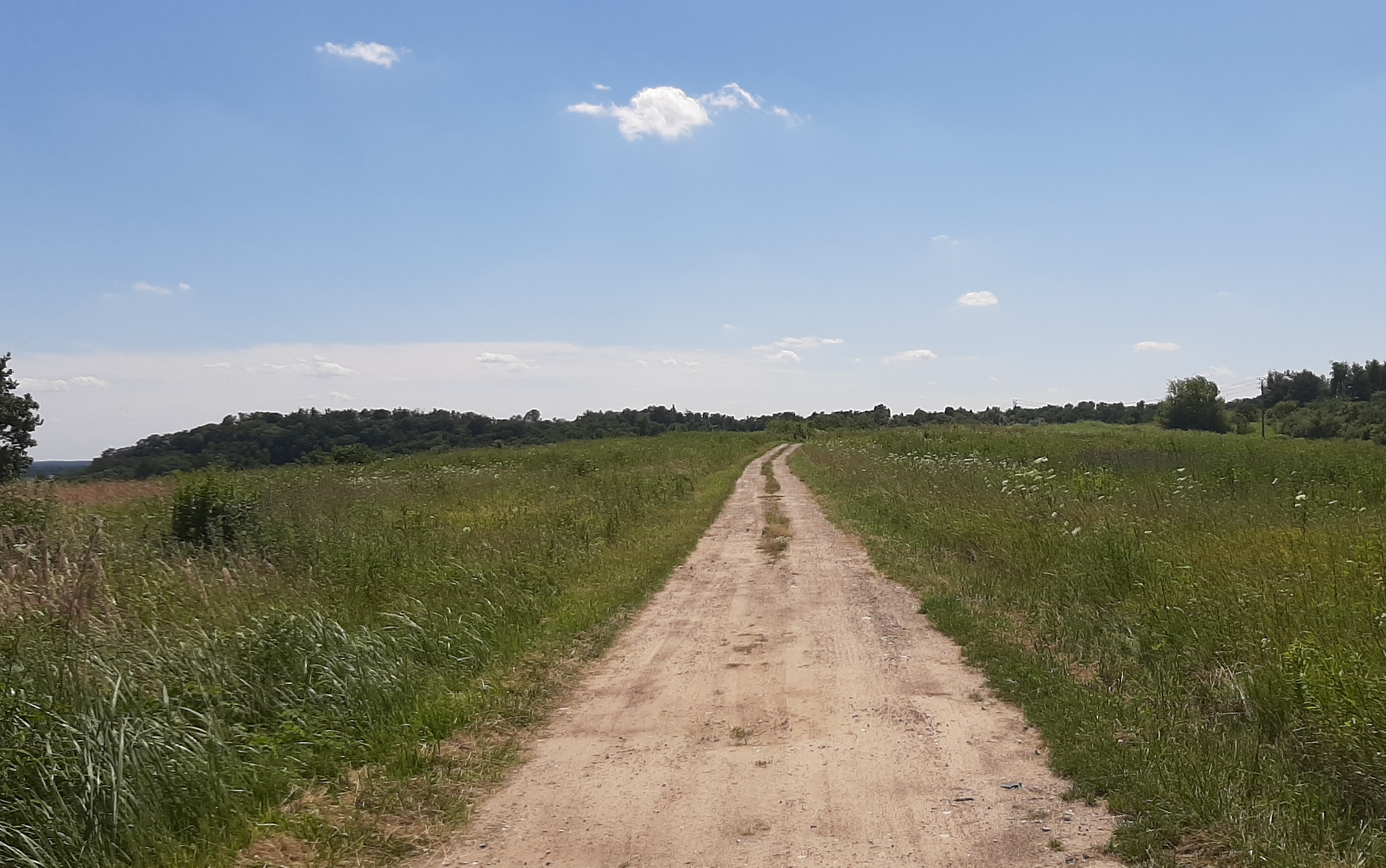

- Location within Poland
- Coordinates: 52°40′37″N 19°09′27″E
- Country: Poland
- Voivodeship: Kuyavian-Pomeranian
- County: Włocławek
- Gmina: Fabianki

Krępiny [krɛmˈpinɨ] is a village in the administrative district of Gmina Fabianki, within Włocławek County, Kuyavian-Pomeranian Voivodeship, in north-central Poland.
