= Skórzno =

- Village
- Location within Poland
- Coordinates: 52°42′N 19°8′E
- Country: Poland
- Voivodeship: Kuyavian-Pomeranian
- County: Włocławek
- Gmina: Fabianki

Skórzno [ˈskuʐnɔ] is a village in the administrative district of Gmina Fabianki, within Włocławek County, Kuyavian-Pomeranian Voivodeship, in north-central Poland.
