= Gmina Fabianki =

Gmina Fabianki Fabianki Commune
- Gmina
- Coat of arms
- Interactive map of Gmina Fabianki
- Coordinates (Fabianki): 52°42′57″N 19°6′23″E
- Country: Poland
- Voivodeship: Kuyavian-Pomeranian
- County: Włocławek County
- Seat: Fabianki

Area
  - Total: 76.1 km^{2} (29.4 sq mi)

Population (2006)
  - Total: 8,719
  - Density: 115/km^{2} (297/sq mi)
- Time zone: UTC+1 (CET)
  - Summer (DST): UTC+2 (CEST)
- Vehicle registration: CWL

Gmina Fabianki is a rural gmina (administrative district) in Włocławek County, Kuyavian-Pomeranian Voivodeship, in central Poland. Its seat is the village of Fabianki, which lies approximately 9 km (6 mi) north-east of Włocławek and 49 km (30 mi) south-east of Toruń.

The gmina covers an area of 76.1 square kilometres (29.4 sq mi), and as of 2006 its total population is 8,719.

== Villages ==
Gmina Fabianki contains the villages and settlements of Bogucin, Chełmica Duża, Chełmica Mała, Chełmica-Cukrownia, Cyprianka, Fabianki, Krępiny, Kulin, Lisek, Nasiegniewo, Nowy Witoszyn, Skórzno, Stary Witoszyn, Świątkowizna, Szpetal Górny and Wilczeniec Fabiański.

== Neighbouring gminas ==
Gmina Fabianki is bordered by the city of Włocławek and by the gminas of Bobrowniki, Dobrzyń nad Wisłą, Lipno and Wielgie.
