= Fabianki, Kuyavian-Pomeranian Voivodeship =

Fabianki
- Village
- Location within Poland
- Coordinates: 52°42′57″N 19°6′23″E
- Country: Poland
- Voivodeship: Kuyavian-Pomeranian
- County: Włocławek
- Gmina: Fabianki
- Population: 660

Fabianki [faˈbʲjankʲi] is a village in Włocławek County, Kuyavian-Pomeranian Voivodeship, in north-central Poland. It is the seat of the gmina (administrative district) called Gmina Fabianki.
