= Patrimoine Ferroviaire et Tourisme =

Belgian railway heritage preserving society

Patrimoine Ferroviaire et Touristique (in French) Toerisme en Spoor Patrimonium (in Dutch)
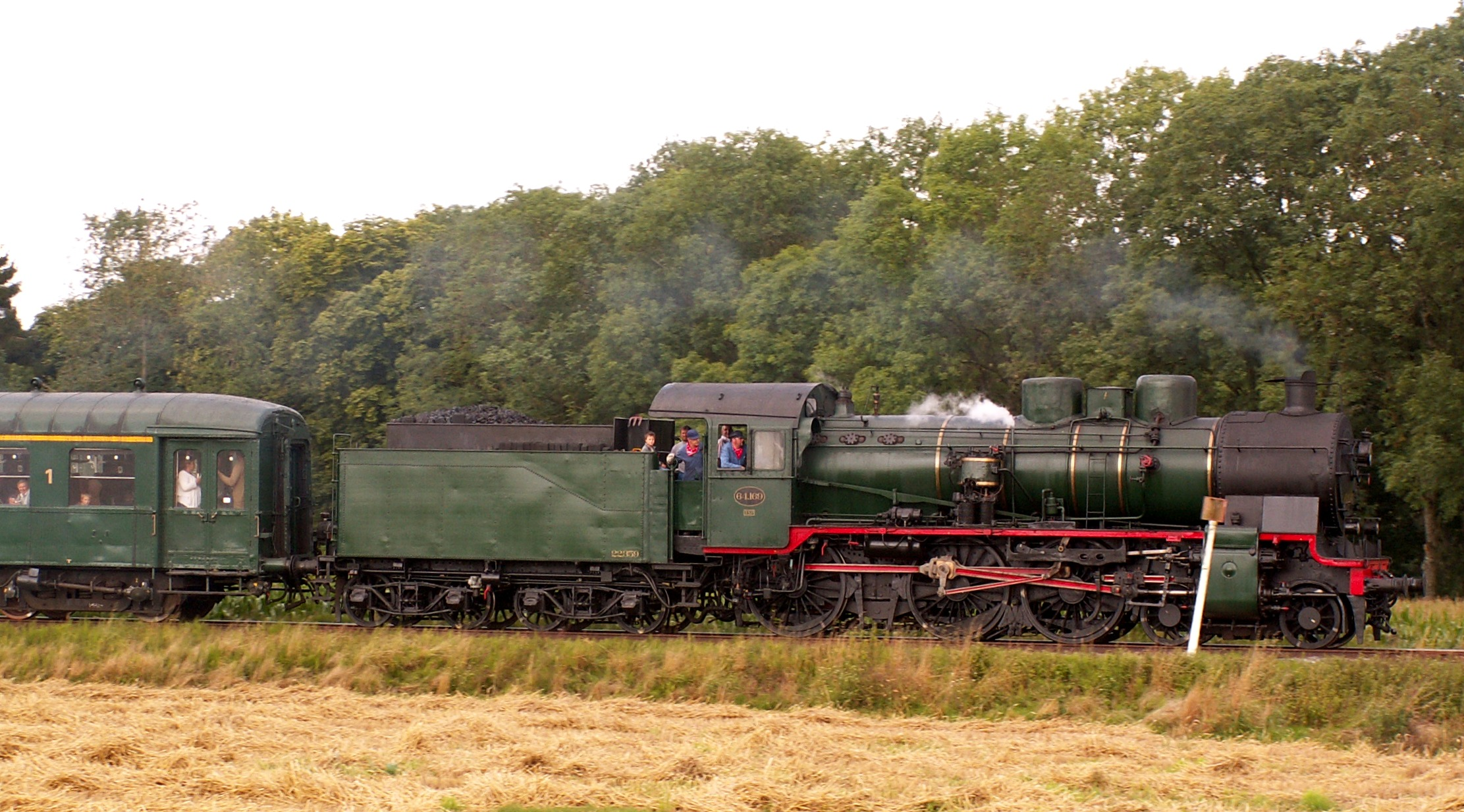
- PFT's 64.169 at a Gala on the Chemin de fer du Bocq, 15 August 2011.
- Locale: Belgium
- Terminus: St Ghislan

Preservation history
- 11 August 1988: Society formed

Website
- http://www.pfttsp.be/

Patrimoine Ferroviaire et Tourisme (in French) (PFT) are a society dedicated to the preservation of Belgian railway heritage. They cover a number of aspects of railway enthusiasm, operating charter trains, maintaining heritage locomotives (steam and diesel) and operating a museum at Saint-Ghislain.

== Charter Trains ==
PFT use to operate charter trains on the Belgian railway network. They have their own train of carriages and fleet of locomotives which are passed by Infrabel for these operations. Both steam and diesel locomotives were used. PFT were often called upon to run trains celebrating railway milestones, e.g. they organised the final workings for the recently withdrawn Class 15 & Class 16 locomotives. Since 2013, SNCB was not allowed to "host" heritage trains on his own security certificate. A new Belgian rail regulation to allow those historic trains is not yet adopted as of 2018.

== Preservation of Belgian Railway Heritage ==
This takes place at their museum in Saint-Ghislain and until end 2018 at their site within SNCB's Schaerbeek depot. Maintenance of the operational fleet use to takes place at Schaerbeek, and vehicle restoration is centred on Saint-Ghislain. The museum is host to a number of model railway events each year. A small depot has been built in Spontin for railcar and infrastructure engines usual maintenance.

=== Fleet List ===
==== Steam Locomotives ====
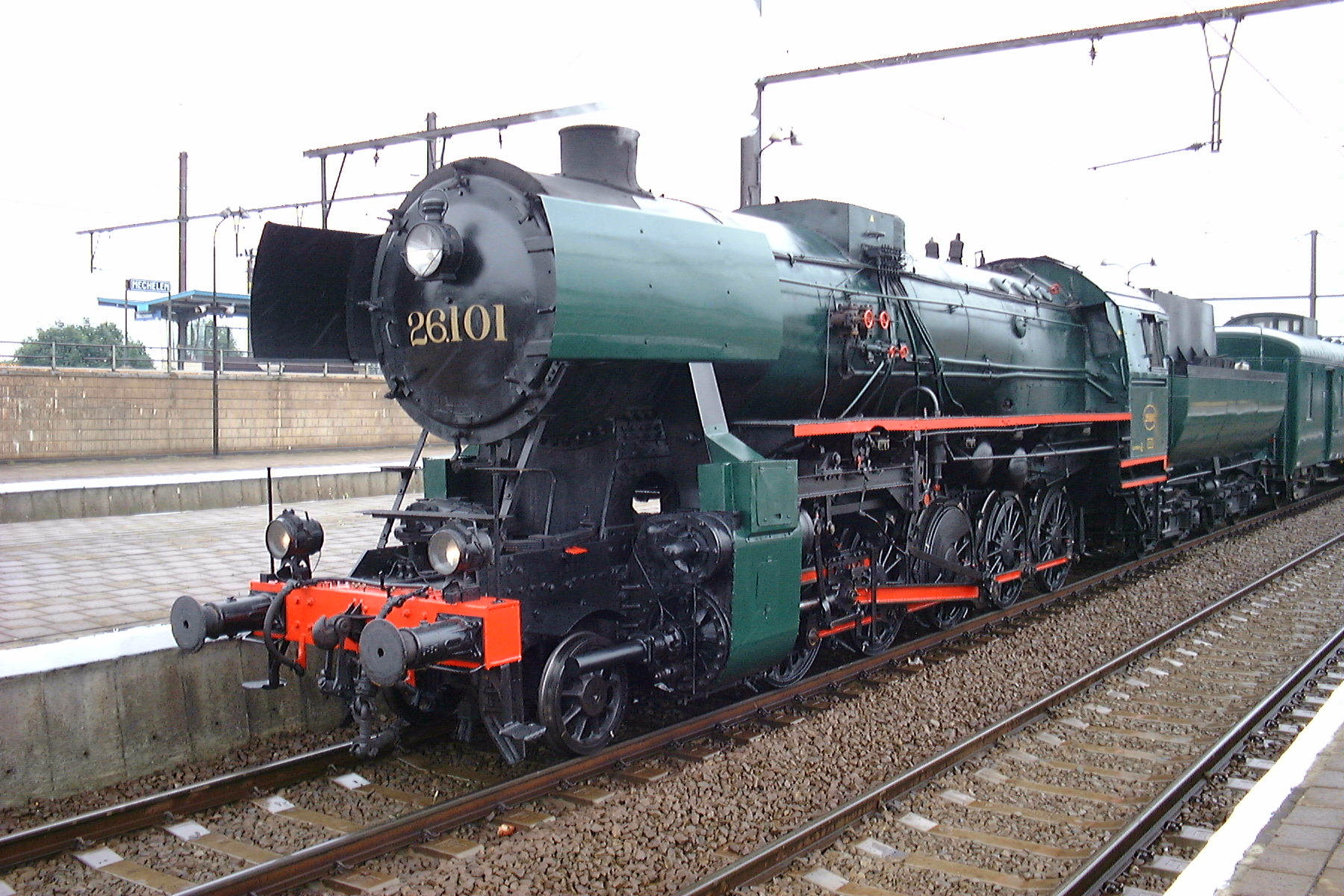
Ty2-3554 running as 26.101 at Mechelen

- CFR 230 084 (numbered SNCB 64.169)
- PKP Ty2-3554 (numbered SNCB 26.101)
- Krupp Knapsack Cn2t 3113 (ex Westfälische Almetalbahn Nr 10)
- Cockerill Bt 2331 (small shunter with vertical boiler)
- La Meuse Bt 3235

==== Diesel Locomotives ====
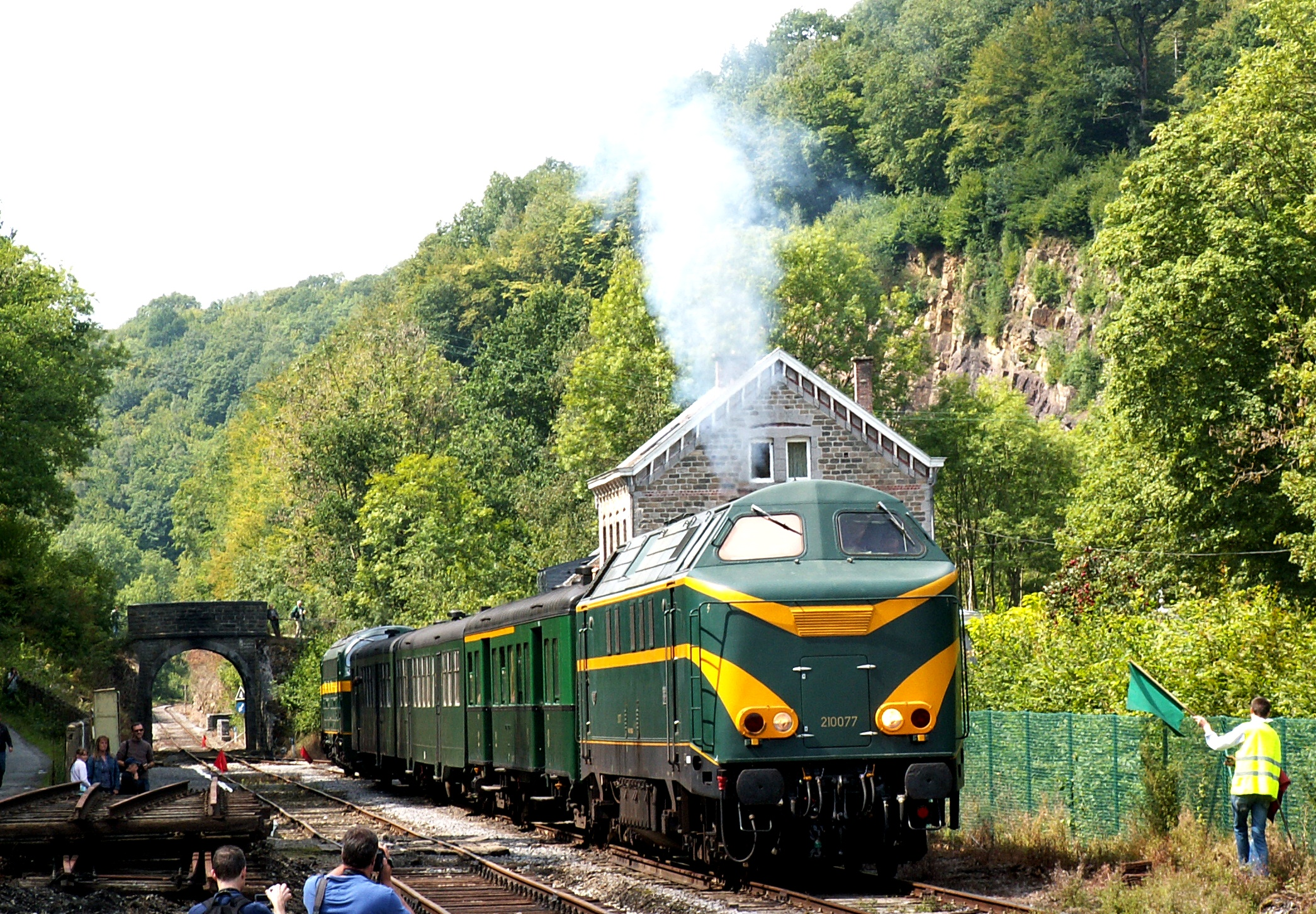
210.077 at Dorinne-Durnal on the CfB

- SNCB Class 51: 5128, 5149, 5183 and 5117 (the later was kept as source of spares, repainted in blue delivery as former 5001, and has been sold in 2017)
- SNCB Class 52: 5205
- SNCB Class 59: 5927, 5941
- SNCB Class 60/61: 6077 (numbered 210.077 on one cab, as of the pre 1971 numbering scheme) and 6106. Prototype loc 6003 was scrapped at Ronet in December 2010. 6010, 6019 for spare parts.
- SNCB Class 62/63: 6289. 6266 was bought for spare parts and has been scrapped after unmounting any useful equipment.
- SNCB Class 70: 7005 (numbered 270.005)
- SNCB Class 71: 7103
- SNCB Class 73: 7305, 7322, 7324, 7325, 7341
- SNCB Class 74: 7409
- SNCB Class 80: 8061
- SNCB Class 83: 8320
- SNCB Class 84: 8428
- SNCB Class 85: 8524
- SNCB Class 91: 9135 (9101 for spare parts)
- SNCB Class 92: 9209
- CFL Class 16: 1603, 1602 (repainted as SNCB 202.020)
- CFL Class 8: 802, 806
- DB Class 236: 42.550, CCB 215, CCB 216 (the last two have been offered for sale in 2018 following a reduction of storage space and scrapped in 2019 as no purchase proposal was received)

==== Electric Locomotives ====
- SNCB Class 15: 1504
- SNCB Class 16: 1608
- SNCB Class 18: 1805
- SNCB Class 20: 2021
- SNCB Class 22: 2201
- SNCB Class 23: 2309
- SNCB Class 25: 2551
- SNCB Class 28: 2801
- SNCB Class 29: 2913

==== Electric Multiple Units ====
- SNCB Class AM54: 027 (offered for sale in 2018 following a reduction of storage space)
- SNCB Class AM54: 082
- SNCB Class AM54: 002 "postal service" (finally not acquired from SNCB historical patrimony, due to lack of storage space)

==== Diesel Multiple Units ====
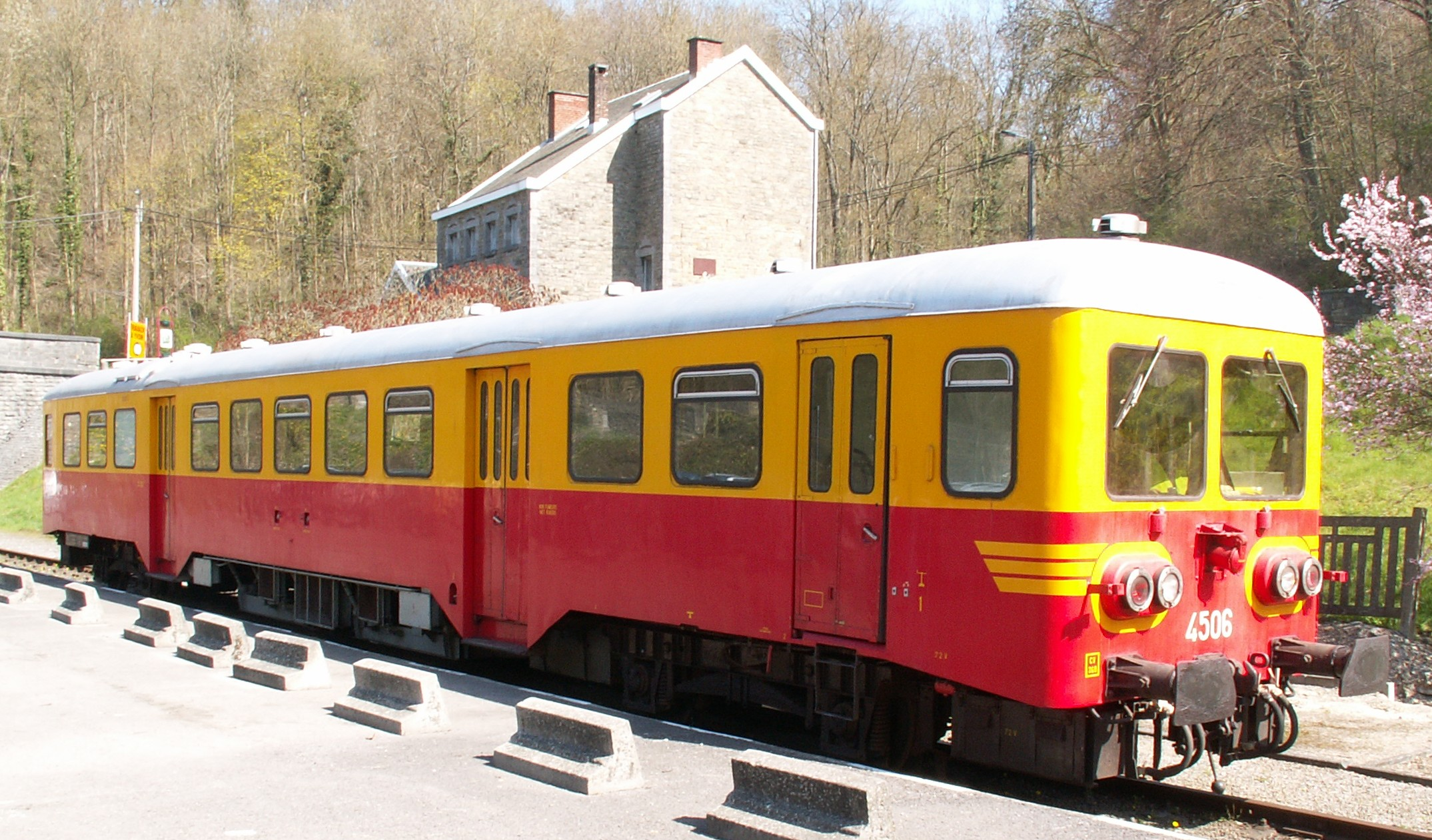
4506 at Spontin on the CfB

- SNCB Class AR40: 4006 (sent back to SNCB Patrimony service in 2021 due to lack of storage space), 4001 (acquired in bad condition, scrapped in 2017)
- SNCB Class AR43: 4333
- SNCB Class AR45: 4506
- SNCB Class AR46: 4602, 4605, 4618 (numbered 554.18)
- SNCB Class AR49: 4906 (numbered 553.29) – under restoration as of 2015
- Class 551: 551.26 – under restoration as of 2015
- ES: ES 102 (former catenary maintenance railcar – proposed for sale in 2018)

== Chemin de fer du Bocq ==
PFT have taken over the 21 km-long (13 mi) Ciney – Spontin – Yvoir railway line (also known as line 128) and operate it as the Chemin de fer du Bocq (CFB) heritage railway. It retains a connection to the national network at Ciney, which facilitates PFT using main line locomotives at their events. A gala is held every year around 15 August. During 2012 CrossRail AG provided a class 66 locomotive as a feature. In 2015, 16 kilometers (between Ciney and Evrehailles-Bauche) are operational. In 2016, the terminal section between Ciney and Braibant – which is parallel to the Bruxelles – Luxemburg main line then undergoing a track / overhead renewal – has been rebuilt. Connection with the national railway network at Ciney was suspended for two seasons. Modernization of the main line is continuing and Infrabel plans to free some unused space in Ciney in 2021–2023. This would allow the Chemin de fer du Bocq to have its own separate 2-tracks platform with a connexion to the Infrabel network. In 2019, rotten sleepers and 40 kg/m (81 lb/yd) rails were removed from the 2.6 km (1.6 mi) section between Evrehailles-Bauche and the Yvoir tunnel. COVID crisis and maintenance tasks with higher priority on the operated section and in Ciney have delayed the track reconstruction schedule that slowly restarted during the summer of 2021.

== En Lignes/Op De Baan ==
PFT produce a bi-monthly commercial magazine aimed at the Belgian rail enthusiasts, produced in French (En Lignes) and Dutch (Op Der Baan) versions. The name translates to English as On the line.
