= Belgian Railways Class 59 =

Class of Belgian diesel locomotives

Class 59
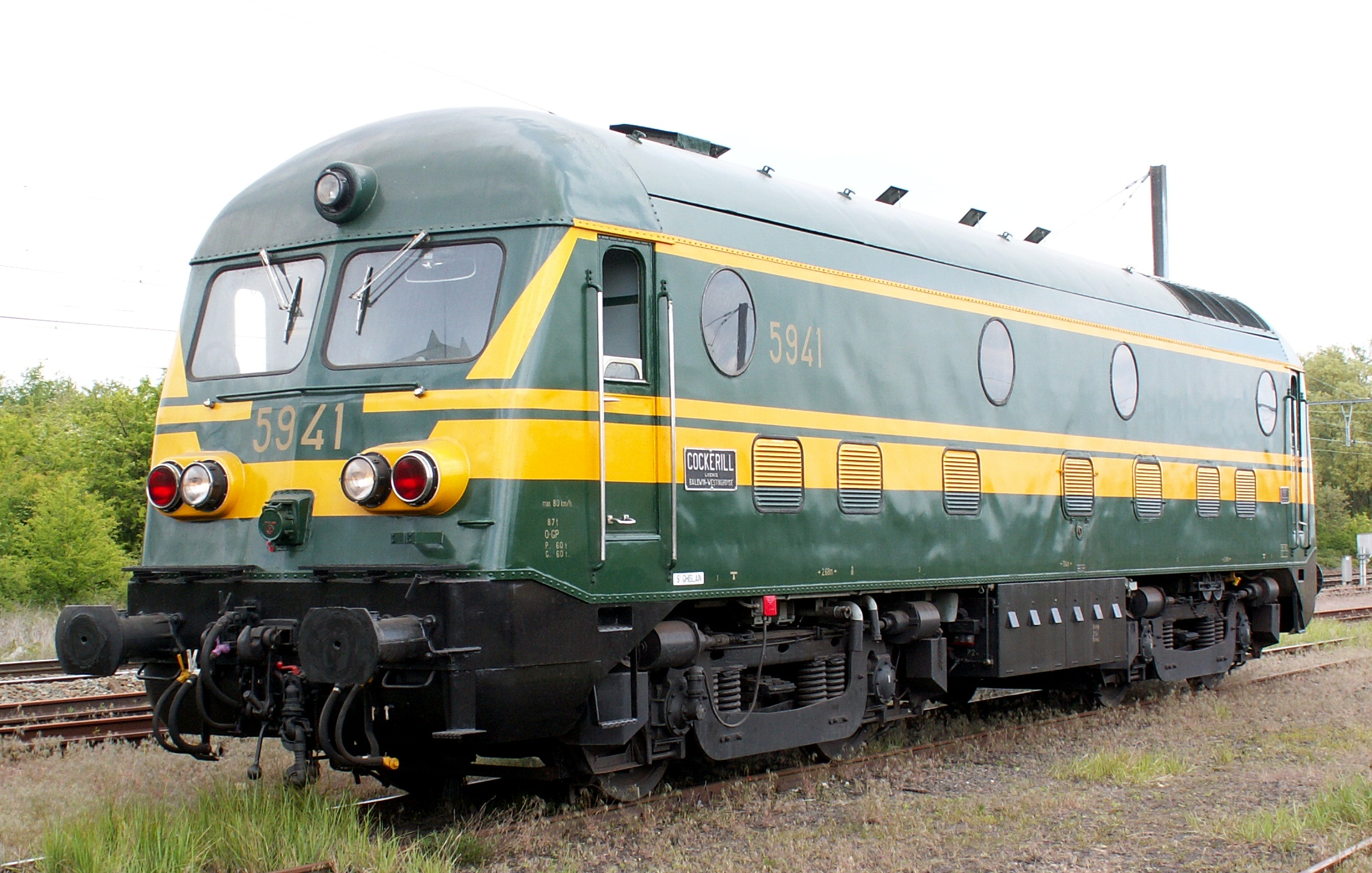
- Restored locomotive in a rail museum in 2010.
Type and origin
- Power type: Diesel
- Build date: 1954
Specifications
- Configuration
  - UIC: B'B
- Gauge: 1,435 mm (4 ft 8 1/2 in) standard gauge
- Width: 2.8 m
- Height: 4.12 m
- Loco weight: 84 t (freight service) 87.2 t (passenger service)
- Fuel type: Diesel
- Fuel capacity: 4000L (1,056 US Gallon) 879 imperia gallon
- Prime mover: Cockerill-Baldwin 608A
- Engine type: I8 Diesel
- Cylinders: 8
- Transmission: Diesel-Electric
- Loco brake: Air
- Train brakes: Air
Performance figures
- Maximum speed: 120 km/h (75 mph)
- Power output: 1,472 MHP 1,740 MHP
- Tractive effort: Start 44,062lbf (196 kN) Continuous 37543.1lbf (167 kN)
Career
- Operators: SNCB/NMBS

The Class 59 is a diesel locomotive of the National Railway Company of Belgium.

The locomotive features dual-ended operation with end-of-train red marker lights. The hood features cantilever doors. In the mid-1960s, they were given a green livery with yellow stripes and additional steps were added under the lights. These locomotives were used on both secondary lines where electrification was not profitable and on the main lines, until they were finally equipped with a catenary. At the end of 1953, NMBS/SNCB ordered 55 of these four axle locomotives (originally called Type 201) which were to be assembled at the John Cockerill factories in Seraing, each equipped with a Baldwin engine. They were first used on light lines of the northern plains of Sambre and the Meuse. The first units the series were delivered in December 1954. They were still being used in June 2002 to haul work trains building the high speed rail lines in France and Belgium.

== Preservation ==
Number	Owner	Remarks
5910	SNCB	Renumbered back to 201.010
5917	SNCB	Spare parts for 201.010
5922	Tubize 2069 vzw	Operational. Located at the Dendermonde–Puurs Steam Railway.
5927	PFT	
5941	PFT	
