= Kulin, Kuyavian-Pomeranian Voivodeship =

Kulin
- Village
- Location within Poland
- Coordinates: 52°40′27″N 19°7′45″E
- Country: Poland
- Voivodeship: Kuyavian-Pomeranian
- County: Włocławek
- Gmina: Fabianki

Kulin [ˈkulin] is a village in the administrative district of Gmina Fabianki, within Włocławek County, Kuyavian-Pomeranian Voivodeship, in north-central Poland.
