= Nasiegniewo =

- Village
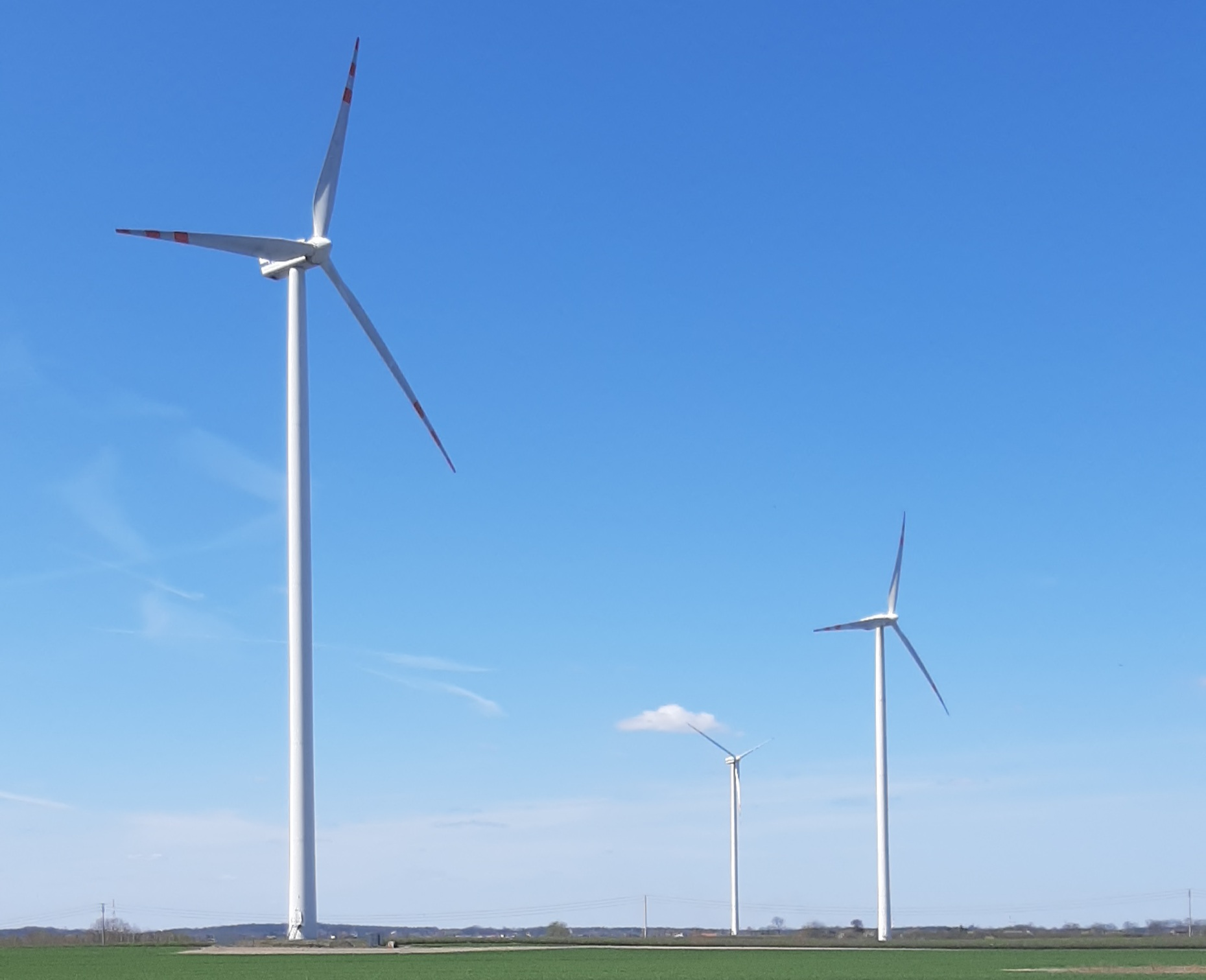
- Wind turbines in Nasiegniewo

- Location within Poland
- Coordinates: 52°41′19″N 19°9′5″E
- Country: Poland
- Voivodeship: Kuyavian-Pomeranian
- County: Włocławek
- Gmina: Fabianki
- Population: 1,203
- Website: http://nasiegniewo.friko.pl/

Nasiegniewo [naɕɛɡˈɲɛvɔ] is a village in the administrative district of Gmina Fabianki, within Włocławek County, Kuyavian-Pomeranian Voivodeship, in north-central Poland.
