= Belgian Railways Class 70 =

Belgian diesel shunting locomotive

Class 70
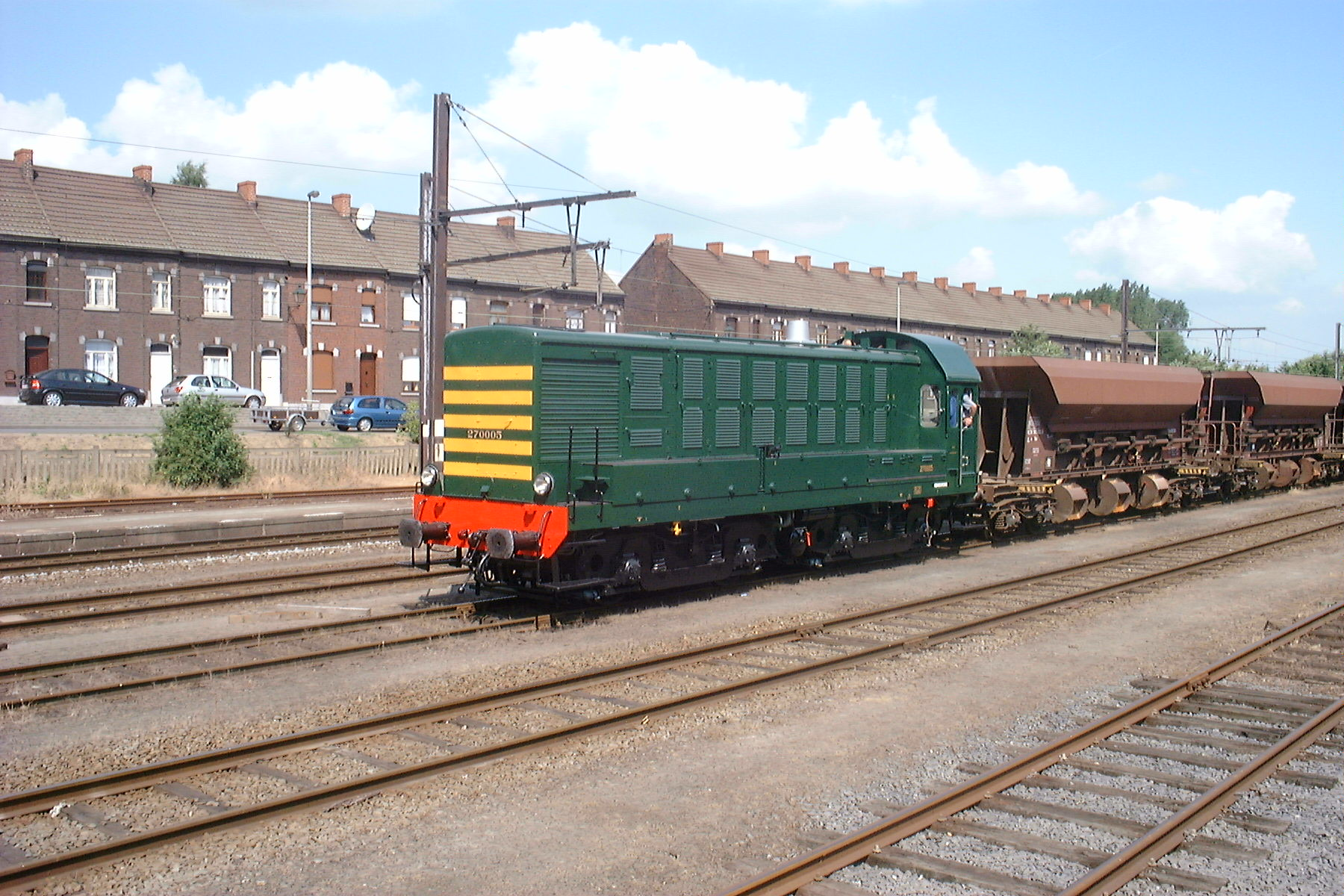
- 7005 (bearing original number 270005) 29 June 2002.
Type and origin
- Power type: Diesel-Electric
- Builder: Baume et Marpent/ACEC
- Build date: 1954
- Total produced: 6
Specifications
- Configuration
  - UIC: Bo′Bo′
- Gauge: 1,435 mm (4 ft 8 1/2 in) standard gauge
- Driver dia.: 1,070 mm (42.13 in)
- Length: 12.15 m (39 ft 10 in)
- Loco weight: 85 tonnes (83.7 long tons; 93.7 short tons)
- Prime mover: 7001/2: ABC 6DXC; 7003/5/6: ABC 8DUS; 7004: Cockerill CO240
- Transmission: Electric
Performance figures
- Maximum speed: 50 km/h (31 mph)
- Power output: 7001/2: 550 kW (740 hp); 7003/5/6: 515 kW (691 hp); 7004: 570 kW (760 hp)
- Tractive effort: 196 kN (44,060 lbf)
Career
- Operators: SNCB/NMBS
- Class: 70 (originally 270)
- Numbers: 7001–7006 originally 270001–270006
- Locale: Antwerp
- Disposition: 5 scrapped, 1 preserved

Class 270 (later reclassified as Class 70) locomotives were the first diesel shunters used by NMBS/SNCB. Three were initially ordered as prototypes of diesel-electric traction. Three diesel-hydraulic Class 271 locomotives were also ordered for comparison.

One loco, 7005, has been preserved by PFT at Saint Ghislain; the others were scrapped after being replaced by class 77s.

== History ==
Built by Belgian locomotive manufacturers Baume & Marpent, the 6 class 270 locomotives were initially allocated to Ronet depot, near Namur. Their electric transmission was produced by ACEC, under licence from Westinghouse. During 1992, 7004 acquired a Cockerill diesel engine to replace its original Anglo Belgian Corporation unit.

After Ronet, during 1961 they were moved on to Antwerp to perform trip workings to and from places such as Boom, Mechelen, Mol and Turnhout. When, at the start of 1971, NMBS/SNCB adopted their current numbering system they became Class 70.
