= Stary Witoszyn =

- Village
- Location within Poland
- Coordinates: 52°43′12″N 19°02′40″E
- Country: Poland
- Voivodeship: Kuyavian-Pomeranian
- County: Włocławek
- Gmina: Fabianki

Stary Witoszyn [ˈstarɨ viˈtɔʂɨn] is a village in the administrative district of Gmina Fabianki, within Włocławek County, Kuyavian-Pomeranian Voivodeship, in north-central Poland.
