= Bogucin, Kuyavian-Pomeranian Voivodeship =

Bogucin
- Village
- Location within Poland
- Coordinates: 52°42′21″N 19°6′21″E
- Country: Poland
- Voivodeship: Kuyavian-Pomeranian
- County: Włocławek
- Gmina: Fabianki
- Population: 696

Bogucin [bɔˈɡut͡ɕin] is a village in the administrative district of Gmina Fabianki, within Włocławek County, Kuyavian-Pomeranian Voivodeship, in north-central Poland.
