= Ostrowy-Cukrownia =

- Settlement
- Location within Poland
- Coordinates: 52°18′4″N 19°10′12″E
- Country: Poland
- Voivodeship: Łódź
- County: Kutno
- Gmina: Nowe Ostrowy
- Population: 40

Ostrowy-Cukrownia [ɔsˈtrɔvɨ t͡suˈkrɔvɲa] is a settlement in the administrative district of Gmina Nowe Ostrowy, within Kutno County, Łódź Voivodeship, in central Poland.
