= Chełmica-Cukrownia =

- Village
- Location within Poland
- Coordinates: 52°43′57″N 19°6′47″E
- Country: Poland
- Voivodeship: Kuyavian-Pomeranian
- County: Włocławek
- Gmina: Fabianki

Chełmica-Cukrownia [xɛu̯ˈmit͡sa t͡suˈkrɔvɲa] is a village in the administrative district of Gmina Fabianki, within Włocławek County, Kuyavian-Pomeranian Voivodeship, in north-central Poland.
