= Belgian Railways Class 16 =

Class 16
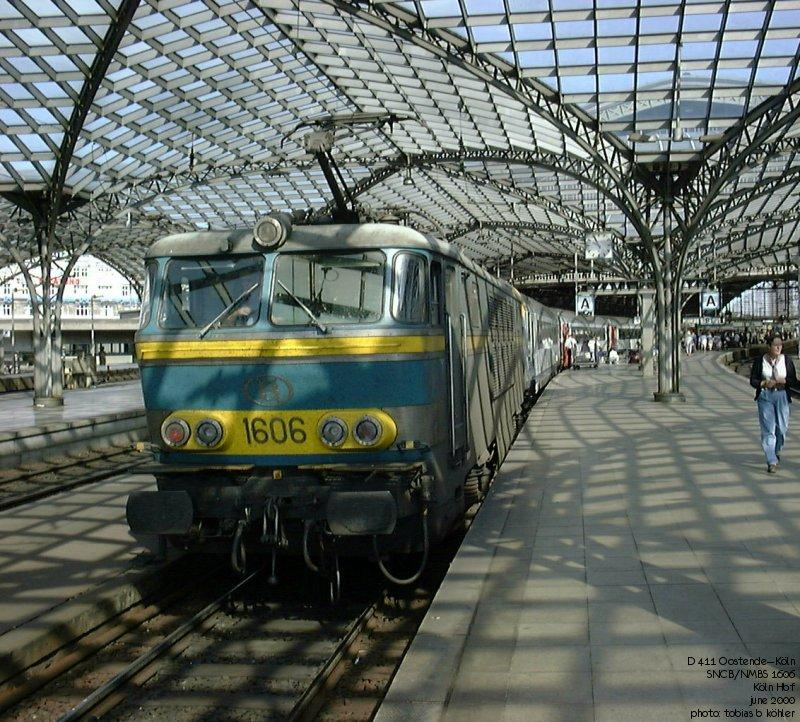
- NMBS/SNCB Class 16 loco 1606 at Köln Hbf
Type and origin
- Power type: Electric
- Builder: BN/ACEC
- Build date: 1966
- Total produced: 8
Specifications
- Configuration
  - UIC: Bo-Bo
- Gauge: 1,435 mm (4 ft 8 1/2 in) standard gauge
- Driver dia.: 1,250 mm (49.21 in)
- Length: 16.65 m (54 ft 8 in)
- Adhesive weight: 10.1 t (9.94 long tons; 11.13 short tons)
- Loco weight: 82.600 t (81.30 long tons; 91.05 short tons)
- Electric system/s: 1,500 V DC; 3,000 V DC; 25,000 V AC; 15 kV 16 2/3 Hz AC
- Current pickup: Pantograph
Performance figures
- Maximum speed: 160 km/h (99 mph)
- Power output: 2,780 kW (3,728 bhp)
- Tractive effort: 196 kN (44,000 lbf)
Career
- Operators: SNCB/NMBS
- Class: 16
- Number in class: 8
- Numbers: 1601-1608
- Delivered: 1966

The Class 16 locomotives was a class of eight electric locomotives built to work cross border services from Belgium. They are equipped with three pantographs to run in France, the Netherlands and Germany. They were displaced from these workings by Thalys electric multiple units and ended up working a few peak hour commuter trains until 2007 when they were withdrawn with two of them saved for preservation. When built they were classified as the 160 class.
