= Tubize 2069 =

Preserved Belgian steam locomotive

HELENA
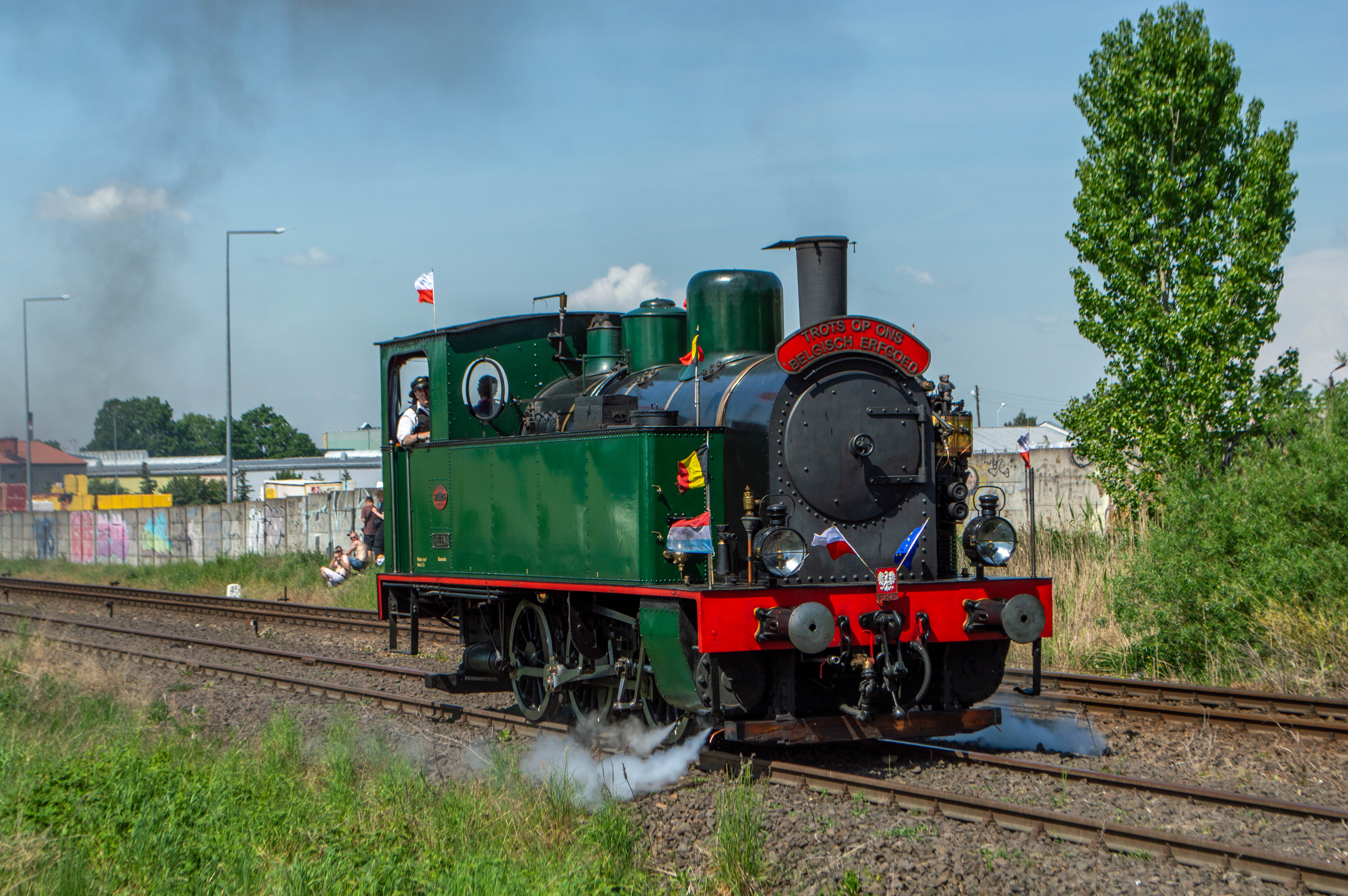
- Tubize 2069 during the steam locomotive parade in Wolsztyn
Type and origin
- Power type: Steam
- Builder: Atelier de Tubize Metalugieque
- Serial number: 2069
- Build date: 1927
Specifications
- Configuration
  - Whyte: 0-6-0T
- Gauge: 1,435 mm (4 ft 8 1/2 in)
- Driver dia.: 1,100 mm (3.6 ft)
- Loco weight: 40 tonnes
- Fuel type: Coal
- Fuel capacity: 1000 kg
- Heating surface: 104.75 m^{2}
- Cylinders: 2
- Valve gear: Walschaerts
- Loco brake: Steam
- Train brakes: Air, fitted 2000
Performance figures
- Maximum speed: 45 kilometres per hour (28 mph)
Career
- Operators: SDP
- Current owner: VZW (non-profit organization) Tubize 2069
- Disposition: In service

Tubize 2069 is a preserved Belgian industrial steam locomotive built by Ateliers de Tubize. The wheel notation is 0-6-0T. The locomotive has been named "HELENA".

At least 15 locomotives of this type were built. Three were built for the National Local Railways Company (Dutch: Nationale Maatschappij van de Buurtspoorwegen). At least three (but no more than six) were built for Métallurgie Hoboken Overpelt factory. Loco No 2069 was one of them.

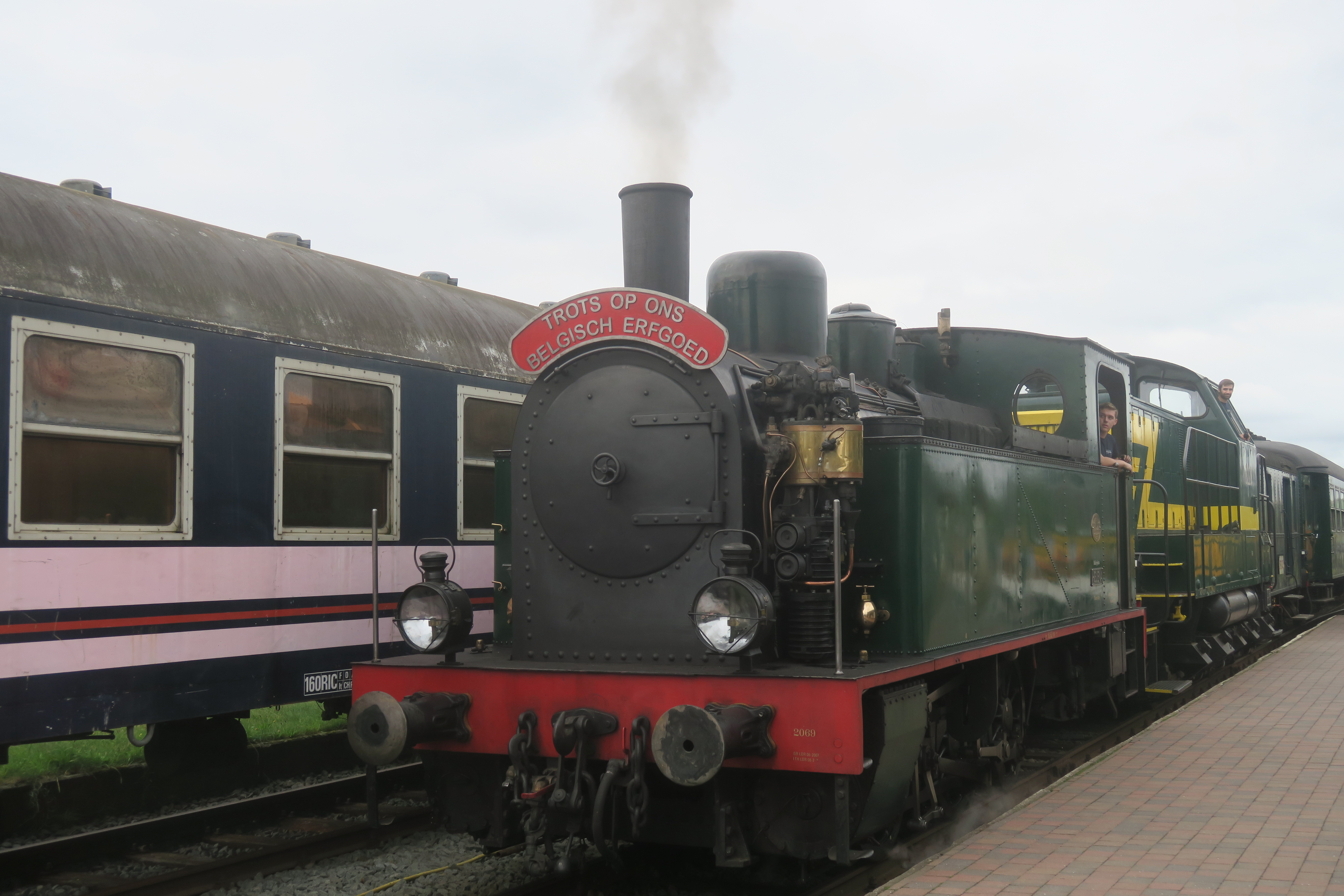
Helena approaching Baasrode-Noord station

Tubize 2069 was used by Métallurgie Hoboken Overpelt until the 1970s. Later it came to the SDP heritage railway (in Dendermonde). It has been restored now and is operational during the summer of 2010.
