= Tubize =

City in Walloon Brabant province, Wallonia, Belgium

Tubize: Tubeke (Dutch)
- City and municipality
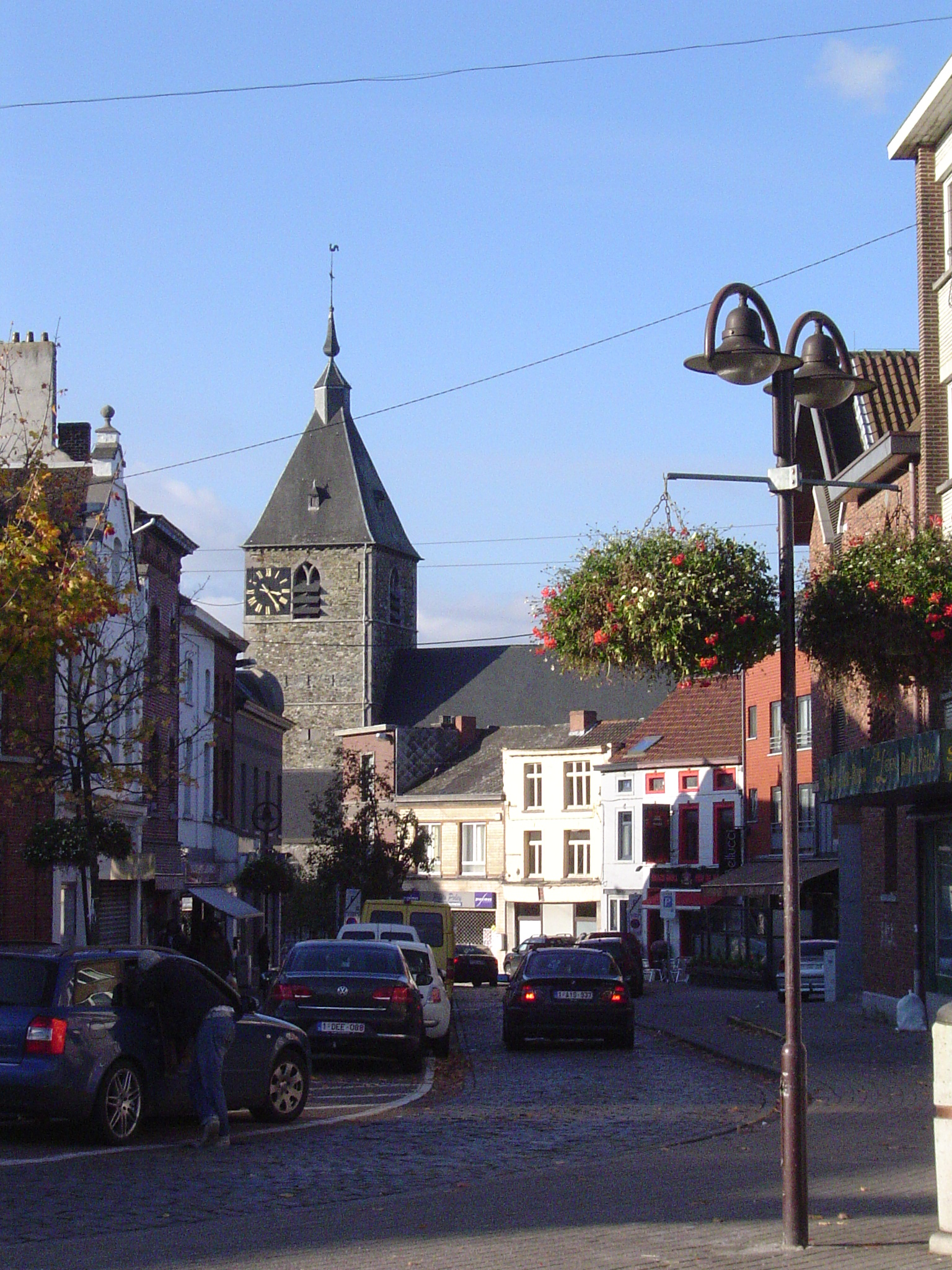

- Flag Coat of arms

- The municipality of Tubize in Walloon Brabant
- Interactive map of Tubize
- Location in Belgium
- Coordinates: 50°41.58′N 04°12.28′E
- Country: Belgium
- Community: French Community
- Region: Wallonia
- Province: Walloon Brabant
- Arrondissement: Nivelles

Government
  - Mayor: Michel Januth (PS)
  - Governing parties: PS, Ecolo, DéFI

Area
  - Total: 32.77 km^{2} (12.65 sq mi)

Population (2018-01-01)
  - Total: 25,914
  - Density: 790.8/km^{2} (2,048/sq mi)
- Postal codes: 1480
- NIS code: 25105
- Area codes: 02
- Website: www.tubize.be

Tubize (French pronunciation: [tybiz]; Dutch: Tubeke [ˈtybeːkə]) is a municipality and city of Wallonia located in the Belgian province of Walloon Brabant. On January 1, 2006 Tubize had a total population of 22,335. The total area is 32.66 km^{2} which gives a population density of 684 inhabitants per km^{2}.

The municipality includes the districts of Clabecq, Oisquercq, Saintes, and Tubize. Bordering Flanders, the town is home to a minority of Dutch-speakers.

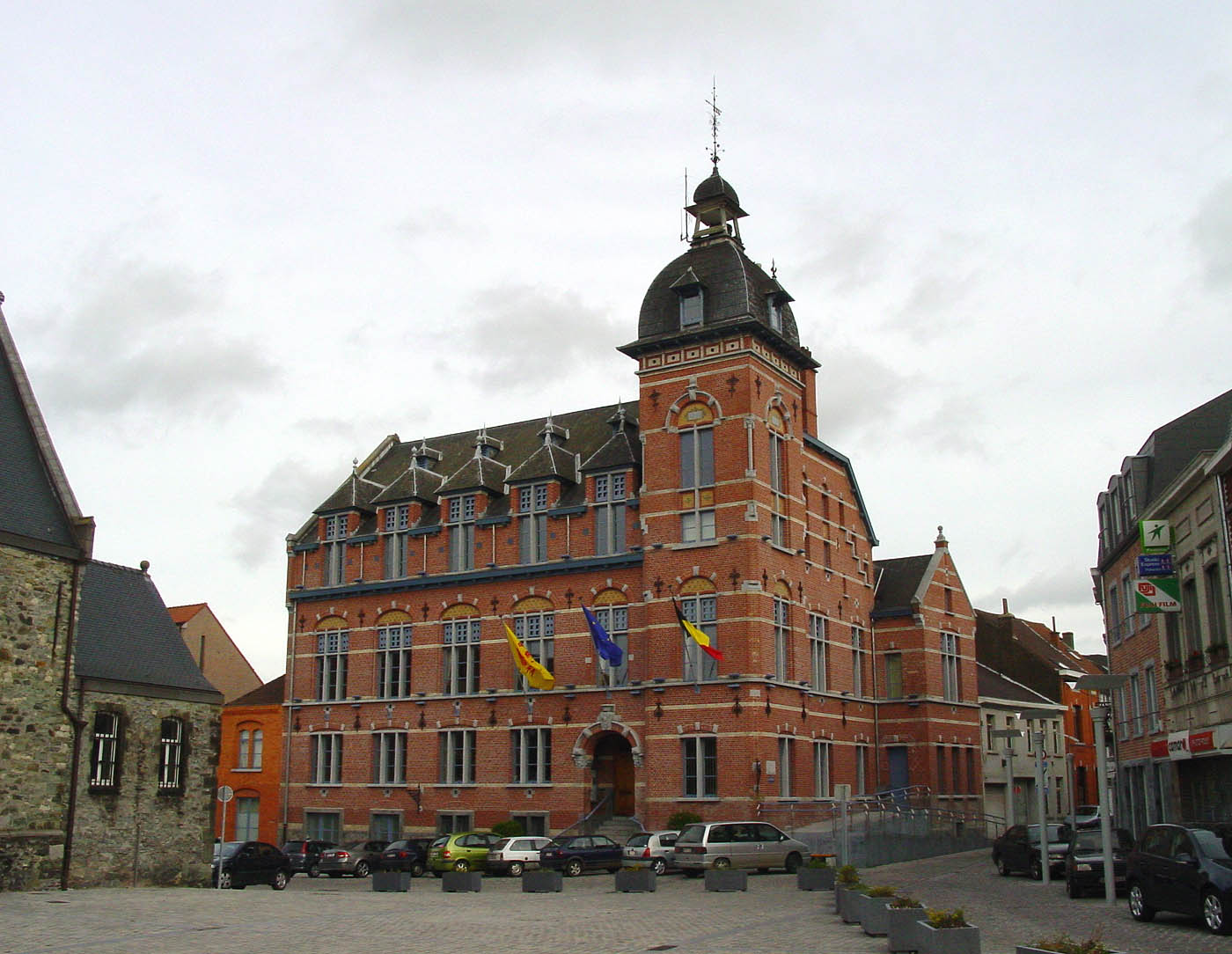
Tubize town hall

== Ateliers de Tubize ==
Les Ateliers de Tubize locomotive works was located in Tubize. At least six Tubize locomotives are preserved. One (Tubize 2069) in Belgium, two narrow gauge locomotives (2365 & 2369) in Jokioinen Museum Railways, Finland, and one narrow-gauge (2179) in Poland. One locomotive is still in operation on the Pelion railway in Greece. Three are preserved in Iran.

== See also ==
- A.F.C. Tubize
